= Harry S. Truman =

President of the United States from 1945 to 1953

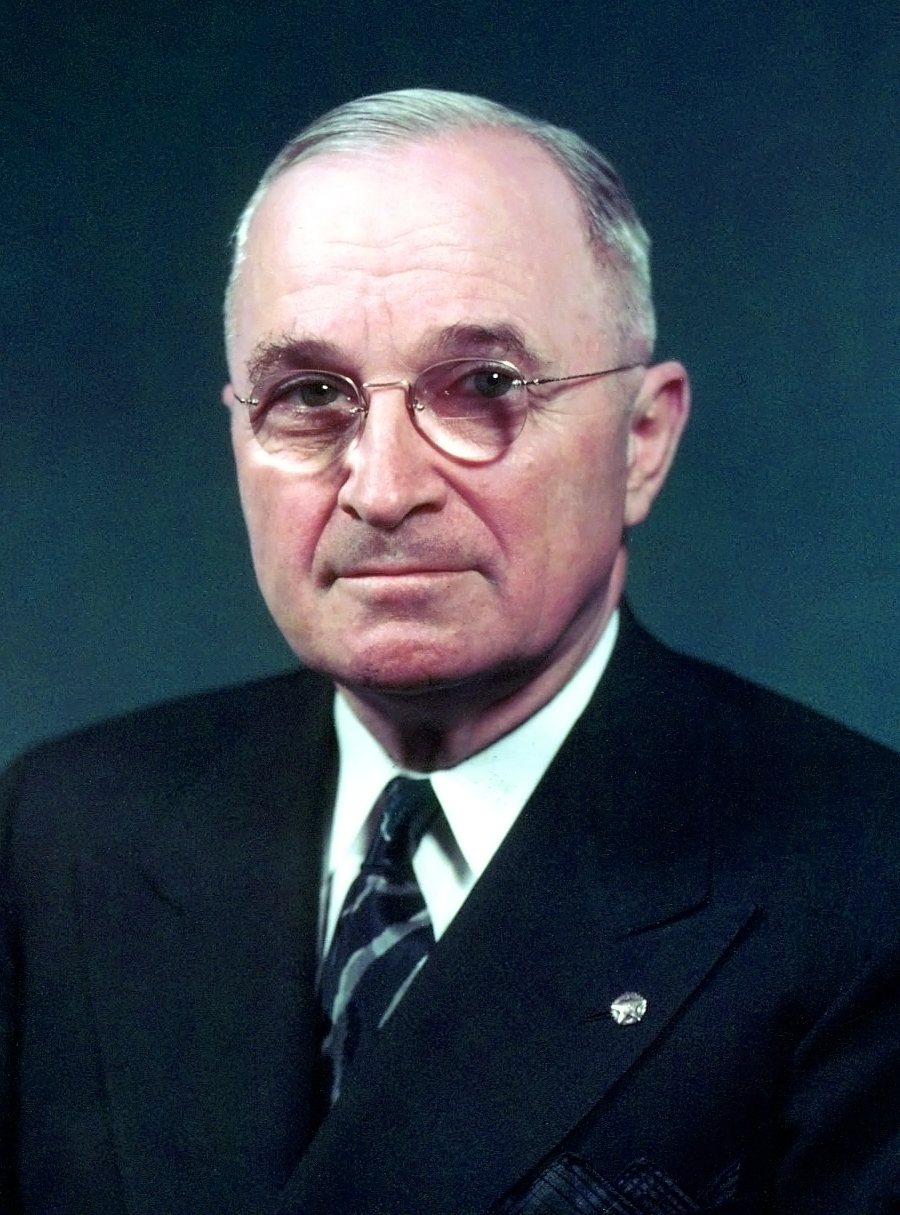
- Official portrait, 1947

33rd President of the United States
- In office April 12, 1945 – January 20, 1953
- Vice President: Vacant (1945–1949) (Note: Truman was vice president under Franklin D. Roosevelt and became president upon Roosevelt's death on April 12, 1945. As this was prior to the adoption of the Twenty-fifth Amendment in 1967, a vacancy in the office of vice president was not filled until the next election and inauguration.); Alben W. Barkley (1949–1953)
- Preceded by: Franklin D. Roosevelt
- Succeeded by: Dwight D. Eisenhower

34th Vice President of the United States
- In office January 20, 1945 – April 12, 1945
- President: Franklin D. Roosevelt
- Preceded by: Henry A. Wallace
- Succeeded by: Alben W. Barkley

United States Senator from Missouri
- In office January 3, 1935 – January 17, 1945
- Preceded by: Roscoe C. Patterson
- Succeeded by: Frank P. Briggs
County offices
Presiding Judge of Jackson County, Missouri
In office January 1, 1927 – January 1, 1935
Preceded by	Elihu W. Hayes
Succeeded by	Eugene I. Purcell
Judge of Jackson County, Missouri's Eastern District
In office January 1, 1923 – January 1, 1925
Preceded by	James E. Gilday
Succeeded by	Henry Rummel

Personal details
- Born: May 8, 1884 Lamar, Missouri, U.S.
- Died: December 26, 1972 (aged 88) Kansas City, Missouri, U.S.
- Resting place: Harry S. Truman Presidential Library and Museum, Independence, Missouri
- Party: Democratic
- Spouse: Bess Wallace (m. 1919)
- Children: Margaret Truman
- Parent: Martha Ellen Young (mother)
- Relatives: Clifton Truman Daniel (grandson)
- Occupation: Farmer; haberdasher; politician

Military service
- Branch/service: United States Army; National Guard; Army Reserve
- Years of service: 1905–1911 (guard); 1917–1919 (active); 1920–1953 (reserve)
- Rank: Colonel
- Unit: U.S. Army Field Artillery Branch
- Commands: Battery D, 129th Field Artillery Regiment, 35th Division; 1st Battalion, 379th Field Artillery Regiment, 102nd Infantry Division; 379th Field Artillery Regiment, 102nd Infantry Division
- Battles: World War I; Battle of Saint-Mihiel; Meuse–Argonne offensive; Defensive Sector
- Awards: World War I Victory Medal; Armed Forces Reserve Medal (2)
- Truman's voice Excerpt from a radio broadcast regarding the Potsdam Conference; Recorded November 1948

Harry S. Truman (Note: Truman had no formal middle name; his parents gave him the middle initial "S" to honor his grandfathers, Anderson Shipp Truman and Solomon Young. The initial did not denote a specific name, and Truman used both punctuated and unpunctuated forms.) (May 8, 1884 – December 26, 1972) was the 33rd president of the United States, serving from 1945 to 1953. As the 34th vice president in 1945, he assumed the presidency upon the death of Franklin D. Roosevelt in April. Truman set up the Marshall Plan to rebuild the badly damaged economy of Western Europe. He established the Truman Doctrine and supported the founding of NATO to contain the expansion of Soviet communism. A member of the Democratic Party, he proposed numerous New Deal coalition liberal domestic reforms, but few were enacted by the conservative coalition that dominated the United States Congress.

Born in rural Missouri, Truman was raised in Independence, Missouri, and during World War I, he fought in France as a captain in the Field Artillery. Returning home, he opened a haberdashery in Kansas City, Missouri, and was elected as a judge of Jackson County in 1922. Truman was elected to the U.S. Senate for Missouri in 1934. Between 1940 and 1944, he gained national prominence as the chairman of the Truman Committee, which aimed to reduce waste and inefficiency in wartime contracts. Truman was elected vice president in the 1944 presidential election and became president upon Roosevelt's death in April 1945. Only then was he told about the ongoing Manhattan Project and the atomic bomb. Truman authorized the first and only use of nuclear weapons in war against the Japanese cities of Hiroshima and Nagasaki.

Truman's administration engaged in an internationalist foreign policy by working closely with Britain. Truman staunchly denounced isolationism. He energized the New Deal coalition during the 1948 presidential election, despite some Democrats splitting off into the Dixiecrats, and defeated both the Republican Party nominee Thomas E. Dewey and Dixiecrat Strom Thurmond. Truman presided over the onset of the Cold War in 1947. He oversaw the Berlin Airlift and the Marshall Plan in 1948. With America's involvement in the Korean War (1950–1953), South Korea repelled the invasion by North Korea. Domestically, the postwar economic challenges such as strikes and inflation created a mixed reaction over the effectiveness of his administration. In 1948, he proposed that Congress should pass comprehensive civil rights legislation. Congress refused, so Truman issued Executive Order 9980 and Executive Order 9981, which prohibited discrimination in agencies of the federal government and desegregated the United States Armed Forces.

Investigations revealed corruption in parts of the Truman administration, and this became a major campaign issue in the 1952 presidential election, although they did not implicate Truman himself. He was eligible for reelection in 1952 but he chose not to run due to poor polling. Subsequently, Truman went into a retirement marked by the founding of his presidential library and the publication of his memoirs. It was long believed that Truman's retirement years were financially difficult, resulting in Congress establishing a pension for former presidents. However, evidence eventually emerged that he amassed considerable wealth, some of it during his presidency. When Truman left office, his administration was heavily criticized. Despite this controversy, historians consistently rank Truman in the first quartile of U.S. presidents. In addition, critical reassessments of his presidency have improved his reputation among historians and the general population.

== Early life, family, and education ==
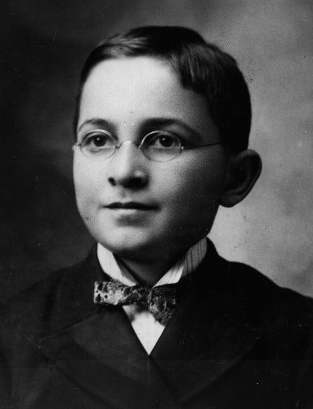
Truman at age 13 in 1897

Harry S. Truman was born in Lamar, Missouri, on May 8, 1884, the oldest child of John Anderson Truman and Martha Ellen Young Truman. He was named for his maternal uncle, Harrison "Harry" Young. His middle initial, "S", is not an abbreviation of one particular name. Rather, it honors both his grandfathers, Anderson Shipp Truman and Solomon Young, a somewhat common practice in the American South at the time. (Note: Truman was given the initial S as a middle name. There is disagreement over whether the period after the S should be included or omitted, or if both forms are equally valid. Truman's own archived correspondence shows that he regularly used the period when writing his name.) A brother, John Vivian, was born soon after Harry, followed by sister Mary Jane. While Truman's ancestry was primarily English, he also had some Scots-Irish, German, and French ancestry.

John Truman was a farmer and livestock dealer. The family lived in Lamar until Harry was ten months old, when they moved to a farm near Harrisonville, Missouri. They next moved to Belton and in 1887 to his grandparents' 600-acre (240 ha) farm in Grandview. When Truman was six, his parents moved to Independence, Missouri, so he could attend the Presbyterian Church Sunday School. He did not attend a conventional school until he was eight years old. While living in Independence, he served as a Shabbos goy for Jewish neighbors, doing tasks for them on Shabbat that their religion prevented them from doing on that day.

Truman was interested in music, reading, history, and mathematics, all encouraged by his mother, with whom he was very close. As president, he solicited political as well as personal advice from her. Truman learned to play the piano at age seven and took lessons from Mrs. E.C. White, a well-respected teacher in Kansas City. He got up at five o'clock every morning to practice the piano, which he studied more than twice a week until he was fifteen, becoming quite a skilled player. During the 1900 Democratic National Convention in Kansas City, Truman served as a page. His father, a dedicated Democrat, had numerous friends involved in the Missouri state Democratic Party, which helped young Harry secure his first political position. At the convention, Truman witnessed a speech by the party's nominee for that year's presidential election, William Jennings Bryan, who would later become his political hero.

After graduating from Independence High School in 1901, Truman took classes at Spalding's Commercial College, a Kansas City business school. He studied bookkeeping, shorthand, and typing but stopped after a year.

Segregation was practiced and largely accepted where Truman grew up. While he later came to support civil rights, early letters of the young Truman reflected his upbringing and prejudices against African, Jewish and Asian Americans.

== Working career ==
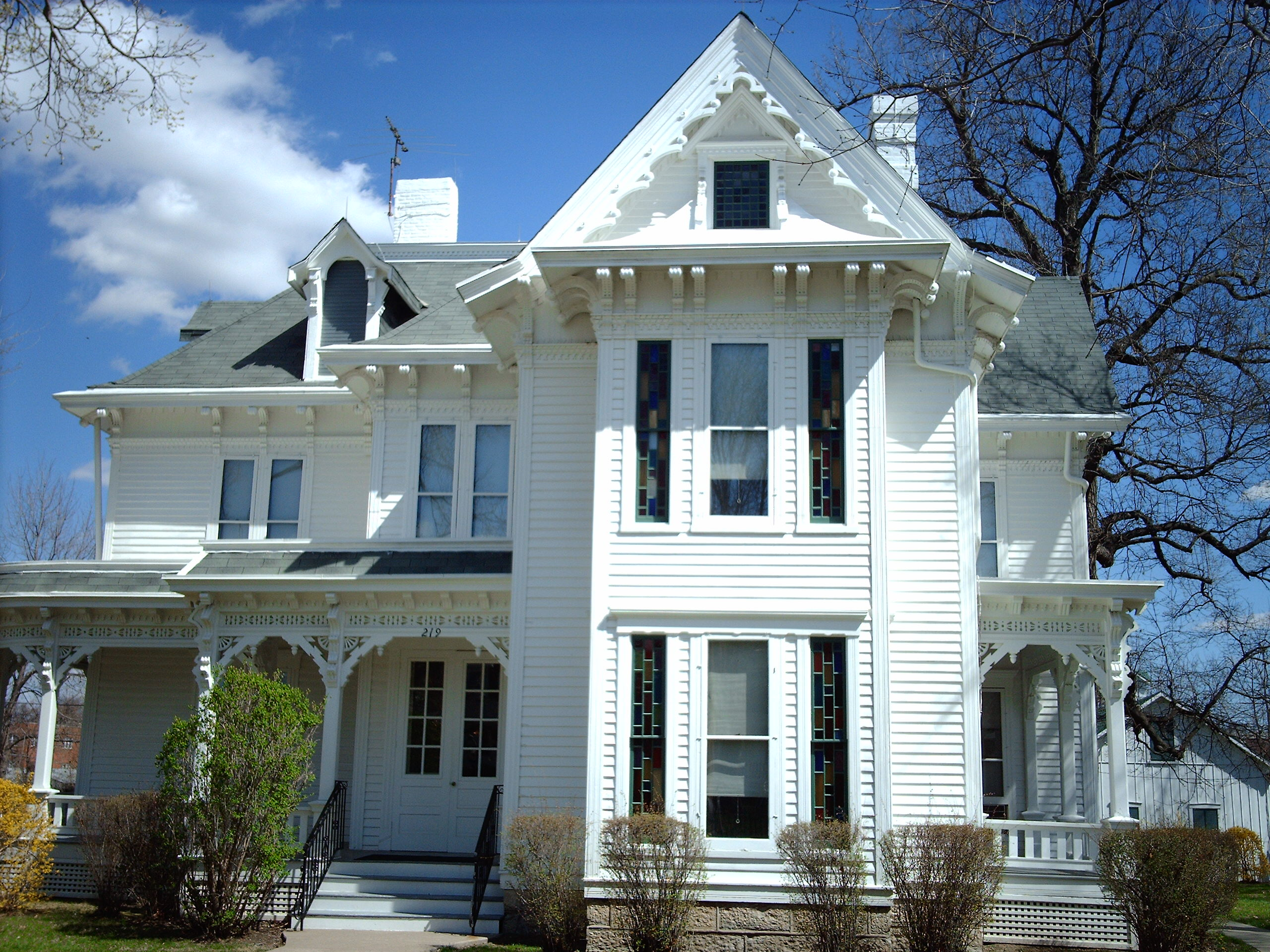
Truman's home in Independence, Missouri

Truman was employed briefly in the mailroom of The Kansas City Star before making use of his business college experience to obtain a job as a timekeeper for construction crews on the Atchison, Topeka and Santa Fe Railway, which required him to sleep in workmen's camps along the rail lines. Truman and his brother Vivian later worked as clerks at the National Bank of Commerce in Kansas City.

In 1906, Truman returned to the Grandview farm, where he lived until entering the army in 1917. During this period, he courted Bess Wallace. He proposed in 1911, but she turned him down. Believing Wallace turned him down because he did not have much money, Truman later said he intended to propose again, but he wanted to have a better income than that earned by a farmer. In fact, Wallace later told Truman she did not intend to marry, but if she did, it would be to him. Still determined to improve his finances, during his years on the farm and immediately after World War I, Truman became active in several business ventures. These included a lead and zinc mine near Commerce, Oklahoma, a company that bought land and leased the oil drilling rights to prospectors, and speculation in Kansas City real estate. Truman occasionally derived some income from these enterprises, but none proved successful in the long term.

Truman is the only president since William McKinley (elected in 1896) who did not earn a college degree. In addition to having briefly attended business college, from 1923 to 1925 he took night courses toward an LL.B. at the Kansas City Law School (now the University of Missouri–Kansas City School of Law) but dropped out after losing reelection as county judge. He was informed by attorneys in the Kansas City area that his education and experience were probably sufficient to receive a license to practice law but did not pursue it because he won election as presiding judge.

While serving as president in 1947, Truman applied for a law license. A friend who was an attorney began working out the arrangements, and informed Truman that his application had to be notarized. By the time Truman received this information he had changed his mind, so he never followed up. After the discovery of Truman's application in 1996 the Missouri Supreme Court issued him a posthumous honorary law license.

== Military service ==
=== National Guard ===
Due to the lack of funds for college, Truman considered attending the United States Military Academy at West Point, New York, which had no tuition, but he was refused an appointment because of poor eyesight. He enlisted in the Missouri National Guard on June 14, 1905, and served until 1911 in the Kansas City-based Battery B, 2nd Missouri Field Artillery Regiment, in which he attained the rank of corporal. At his induction, his eyesight without glasses was unacceptable: 20/50 in the right eye and 20/400 in the left (the latter being past the standard for legal blindness). The second time he took the test, he passed by secretly memorizing the eye chart. He was described as 5 feet 10 inches (178 cm) tall, gray eyed, dark haired and of light complexion.

=== World War I ===
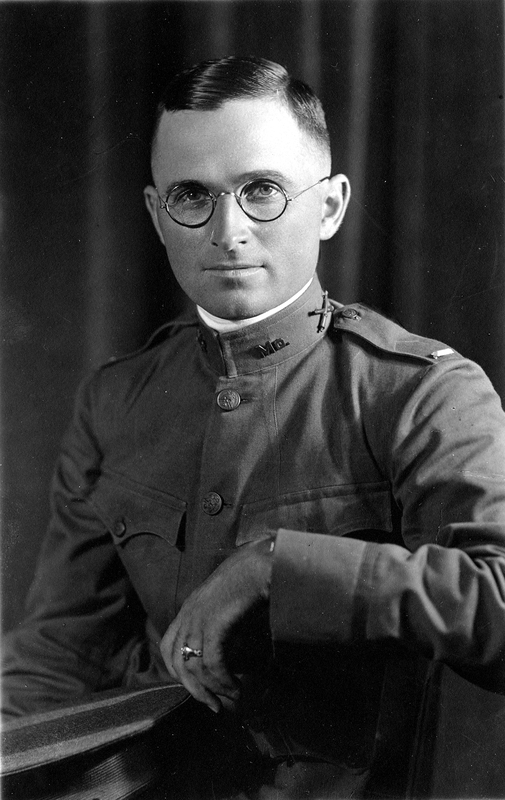
Truman in September 1917

When the United States entered World War I on April 6, 1917, Truman rejoined Battery B, successfully recruiting new soldiers for the expanding unit, for which he was elected as their first lieutenant. Before deployment to France, Truman was sent for training to Camp Doniphan, Fort Sill, near Lawton, Oklahoma, when his regiment was federalized as the 129th Field Artillery. The regimental commander during its training was Robert M. Danford, who later served as the Army's Chief of Field Artillery. Truman recalled that he learned more practical, useful information from Danford in six weeks than from six months of formal Army instruction, and when Truman served as an artillery instructor, he consciously patterned his approach on Danford's.

Truman also ran the camp canteen with Edward Jacobson, a clothing store clerk he knew from Kansas City. Unlike most canteens funded by unit members, which usually lost money, the canteen operated by Truman and Jacobson turned a profit, returning each soldier's initial $2 investment and $10,000 in dividends in six months. At Fort Sill, Truman met Lieutenant James M. Pendergast, nephew of Tom Pendergast, a Kansas City political boss, a connection that had a profound influence on Truman's later life.

In mid-1918, about one million soldiers of the American Expeditionary Forces (AEF) were in France. Truman was promoted to captain effective April 23, and in July became commander of the newly arrived Battery D, 129th Field Artillery, 35th Division. Battery D was known for its discipline problems, and Truman was initially unpopular because of his efforts to restore order. Despite attempts by the men to intimidate him into quitting, Truman succeeded by making his corporals and sergeants accountable for discipline. He promised to back them up if they performed capably and reduce them to private if they did not. In an event memorialized in battery lore as "The Battle of Who Run", his soldiers began to flee during a sudden night attack by the Germans in the Vosges Mountains; Truman succeeded at ordering his men to stay and fight, using profanity from his railroad days. The men were so surprised to hear Truman use such language that they immediately obeyed.

Truman's unit joined in a massive prearranged assault barrage on September 26, 1918, at the opening of the Meuse–Argonne offensive. They advanced with difficulty over pitted terrain to follow the infantry, and set up an observation post west of Cheppy. On September 27, Truman saw through his binoculars an enemy artillery battery deploying across a river in a position which would allow them to fire upon the neighboring 28th Division. Truman's orders limited him to targets facing the 35th Division, but he ignored this and patiently waited until the Germans had walked their horses well away from their guns, ensuring they could not relocate out of range of Truman's battery. He then ordered his men to open fire, and their attack destroyed the enemy battery. His actions were credited with saving the lives of 28th Division soldiers who otherwise would have come under fire from the Germans. Truman was given a dressing down by his regimental commander, Colonel Karl D. Klemm, who threatened to convene a court-martial, but Klemm never followed through, and Truman was not punished.

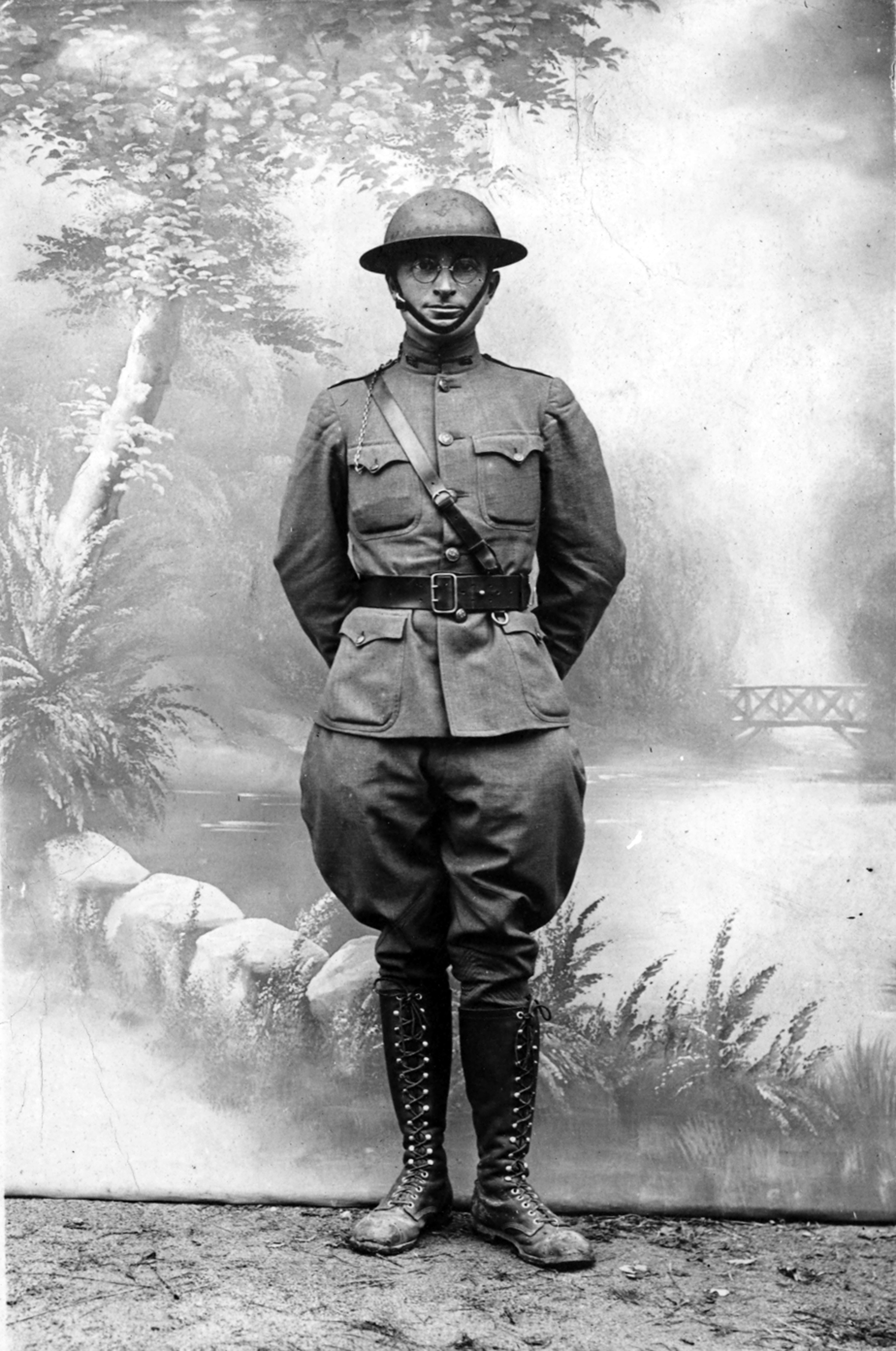
Truman in uniform, c. 1918

In other action during the Meuse–Argonne offensive, Truman's battery provided support for George S. Patton's tank brigade, and fired some of the last shots of the war on November 11, 1918. Battery D did not lose any men while under Truman's command in France. To show their appreciation for his leadership, his men presented him with a large loving cup upon their return to the United States after the war.

The war was a transformative experience in which Truman manifested his leadership qualities. He had entered the service in 1917 as a family farmer who had worked in clerical jobs that did not require the ability to motivate and direct others, but during the war, he gained leadership experience and a record of success that greatly enhanced and supported his post-war political career in Missouri.

Truman was brought up in the Presbyterian and Baptist churches, but avoided revivals and sometimes ridiculed revivalist preachers. He rarely spoke about religion, which to him, primarily meant ethical behavior along traditional Protestant lines. Truman once wrote in a letter to his future wife, Bess: "You know that I know nothing about Lent and such things..." Most of the soldiers he commanded in the war were Catholics, and one of his close friends was the 129th Field Artillery's chaplain, Monsignor L. Curtis Tiernan. The two remained friends until Tiernan's death in 1960. Developing leadership and interpersonal skills that later made him a successful politician helped Truman get along with his Catholic soldiers, as he did with soldiers of other Christian denominations and the unit's Jewish members.

=== Officers' Reserve Corps ===
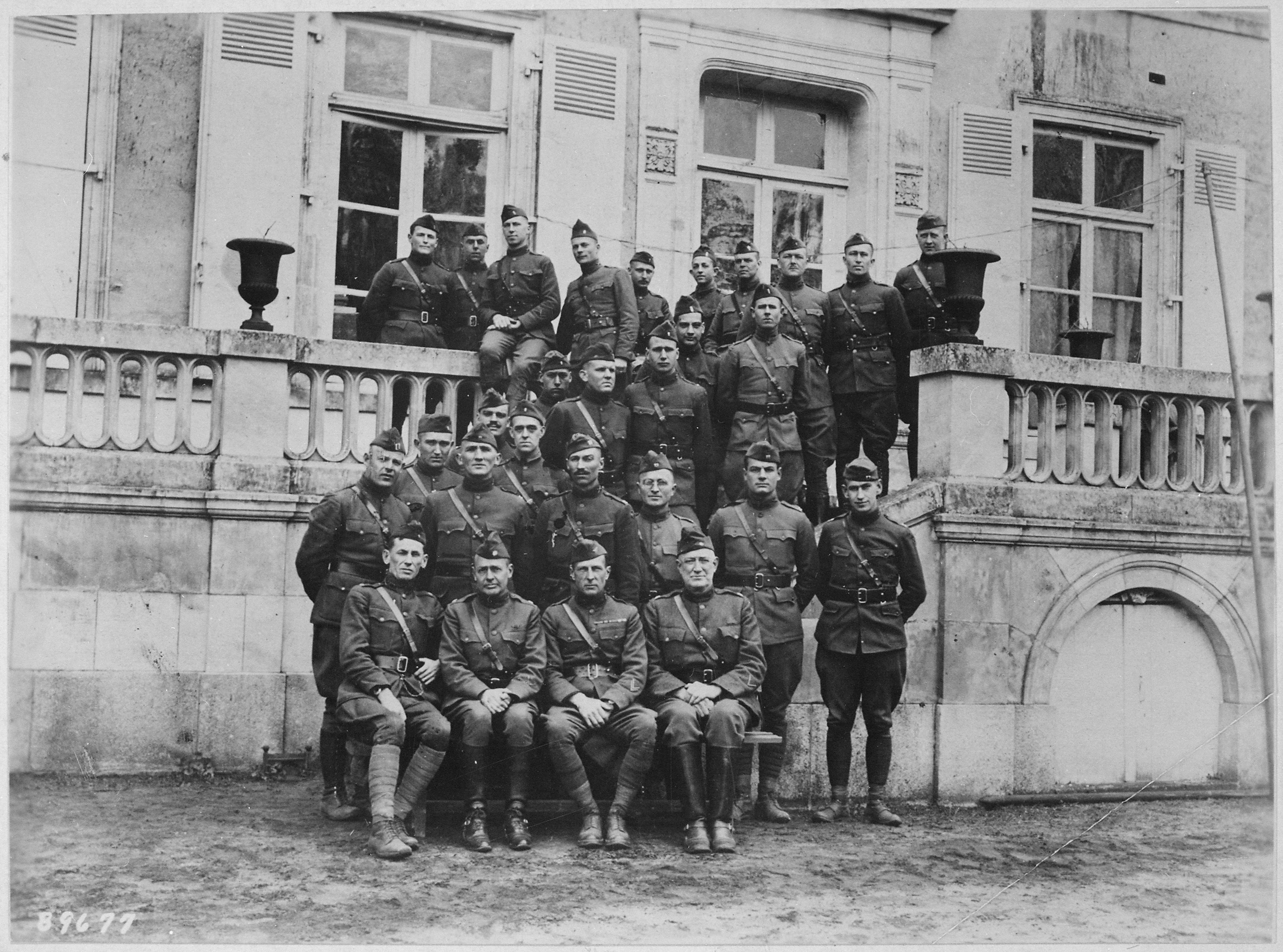
Officers of the 129th Field Artillery, at regimental headquarters at Chateau le Chanay near Courcemont, France, March 1919. Captain Harry S. Truman is pictured in the second row, third from the right.

Truman was honorably discharged from the Army as a captain on May 6, 1919. In 1920, he was appointed a major in the Officers Reserve Corps. He became a lieutenant colonel in 1925 and a colonel in 1932. In the 1920s and 1930s he commanded 1st Battalion, 379th Field Artillery Regiment, 102nd Infantry Division. After promotion to colonel, Truman advanced to command of the regiment.

After his election to the U.S. Senate, Truman was transferred to the General Assignments Group, a holding unit for less active officers, although he had not been consulted in advance. Truman protested his reassignment, which led to his resumption of regimental command. He remained an active reservist until the early 1940s. Truman volunteered for active military service during World War II, but was not accepted, partly because of age, and partly because President Franklin D. Roosevelt desired that senators and congressmen who belonged to the military reserves support the war effort by remaining in Congress, or by ending their active duty service and resuming their congressional seats. He was an inactive reservist from the early 1940s until retiring as a colonel in the then redesignated U.S. Army Reserve on January 20, 1953.

=== Military awards and decorations ===
Truman was awarded a World War I Victory Medal with two battle clasps (for St. Mihiel and Meuse-Argonne) and a Defensive Sector Clasp. He was also the recipient of two Armed Forces Reserve Medals. After the war, Truman almost always wore a bronze World War I victory lapel pin as a memento of his overseas service.

== After the War ==
=== Marriage ===
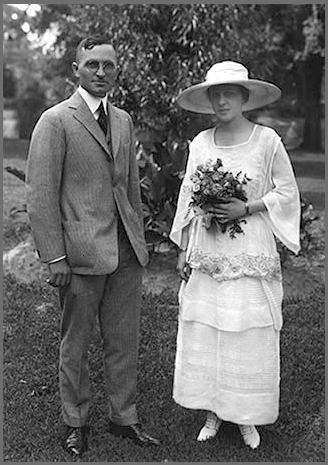
Harry and Bess Truman on their wedding day, June 28, 1919

After his wartime service, Truman returned to Independence, where he married Bess Wallace on June 28, 1919. The couple had one child, Mary Margaret Truman.

Shortly before the wedding, Truman and Jacobson opened a haberdashery together at 104 West 12th Street in downtown Kansas City. After brief initial success, the store went bankrupt during the recession of 1921. Truman did not pay off the last of the debts from that venture until 1935, when he did so with the aid of banker William T. Kemper, who worked behind the scenes to enable Truman's brother Vivian to buy Truman's $5,600 promissory note during the asset sale of a bank that had failed in the Great Depression. The note had risen and fallen in value as it was bought and sold, interest accumulated and Truman made payments, so by the time the last bank to hold it failed, it was worth nearly $9,000. Thanks to Kemper's efforts, Vivian Truman was able to buy it for $1,000. Jacobson and Truman remained close friends even after their store failed, and Jacobson's advice to Truman on Zionism later played a role in the U.S. Government's decision to recognize Israel.

=== Jackson County judge ===
With the help of the Kansas City Democratic machine led by Tom Pendergast, Truman was elected in 1922 as County Court judge of Jackson County's eastern district—Jackson County's three-judge court included judges from the western district (Kansas City), the eastern district (the county outside Kansas City), and a presiding judge elected countywide. This was an administrative rather than a judicial court, similar to county commissions in many other jurisdictions. Truman succeeded James E. Gilday and served from January 1, 1923, to January 1, 1925. He lost his 1924 reelection campaign to Henry Rummel in a Republican wave led by President Calvin Coolidge's landslide election to a full term. Two years selling automobile club memberships convinced him that a public service career was safer for a family man approaching middle age, and he planned a run for presiding judge in 1926.

Truman won the job in 1926 with the support of the Pendergast machine, and succeeded Elihu W. Hayes. Truman was re-elected in 1930; he served from January 1, 1927, to January 1, 1935, and was succeeded by Eugene I. Purcell. As presiding judge, Truman helped coordinate the Ten Year Plan, which transformed Jackson County and the Kansas City skyline with new public works projects, including an extensive series of roads and construction of a new Wight and Wight-designed County Court building. Also in 1926, he became president of the National Old Trails Road Association, and during his term he oversaw dedication of 12 Madonna of the Trail monuments to honor pioneer women.

In 1933, Truman was named Missouri's director for the Federal Re-Employment program (part of the Civil Works Administration) at the request of Postmaster General James Farley. This was payback to Pendergast for delivering the Kansas City vote to Franklin D. Roosevelt in the 1932 presidential election. The appointment confirmed Pendergast's control over federal patronage jobs in Missouri and marked the zenith of his power. It also created a relationship between Truman and Roosevelt's aide Harry Hopkins and assured Truman's avid support for the New Deal.

=== U.S. Senator from Missouri ===
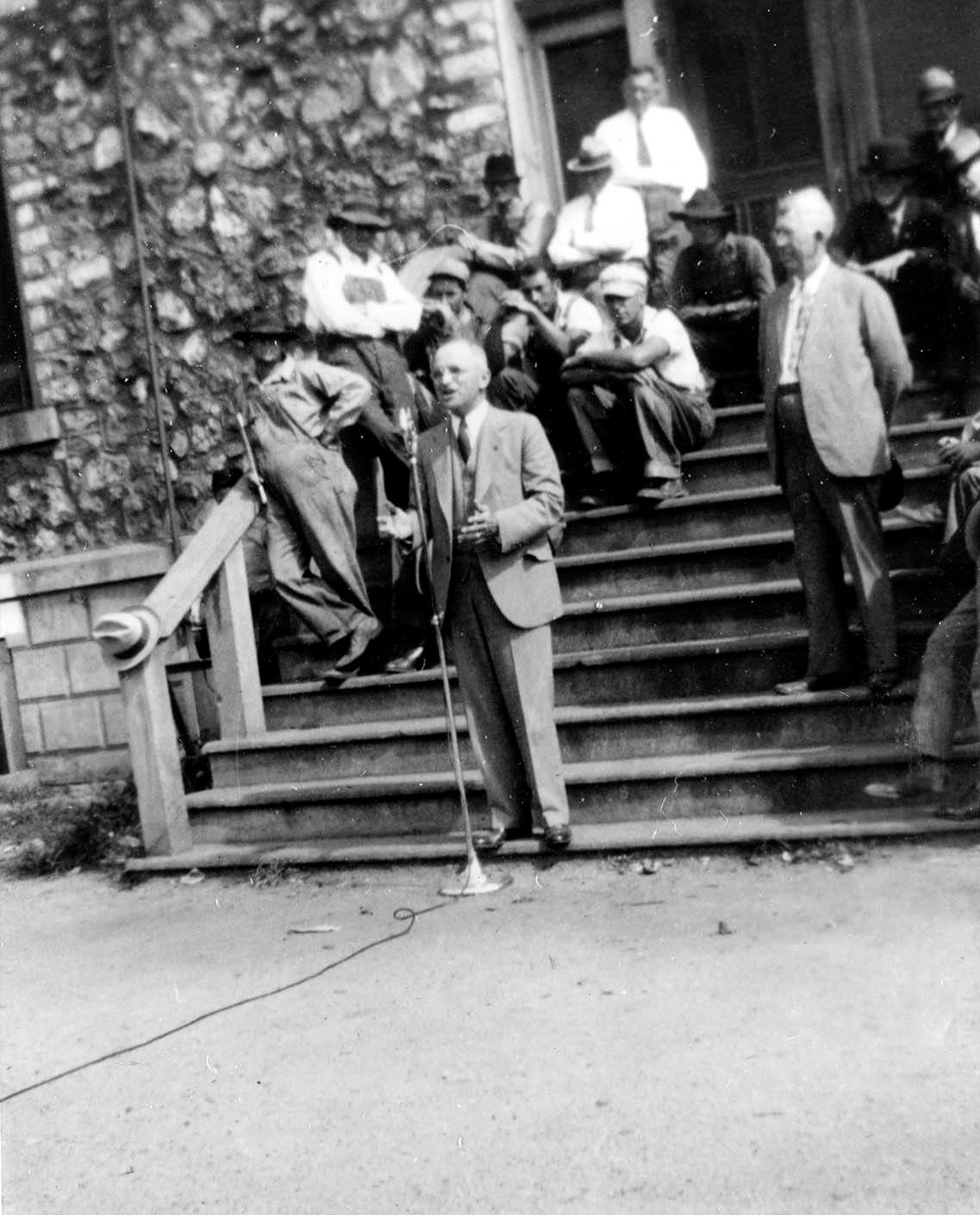
Truman campaigning in Thayer, Missouri, c. October 5, 1934

After serving as a county judge, Truman wanted to run for governor of Missouri or Congress, but Pendergast rejected these ideas. Truman then thought he might serve out his career in some well-paying county sinecure; circumstances changed when Pendergast reluctantly backed him as the machine's choice in the 1934 Democratic primary election for the U.S. Senate from Missouri, after Pendergast's first four choices had declined to run. (Note: Pendergast's first four choices were former US Senator James A. Reed, US Representative Joe Shannon, former state Democratic chairman Charles M. Howell, and Jackson County Democratic chairman James P. Aylward.) In the primary, Truman defeated Congressmen John J. Cochran and Jacob L. Milligan with the solid support of Jackson County, which was crucial to his candidacy. Also critical were the contacts he had made statewide in his capacity as a county official, member of the Freemasons, (Note: Truman held several leadership positions at the local and state level and in 1940 was elected to a one year term as Grand Master of the Grand Lodge of Missouri. In October 1945 he received the 33rd degree of the Scottish Rite.) military reservist, (Note: Truman was a founder of the Reserve Officers Association and organized Missouri's first chapter, Chapter 1.) and member of the American Legion. (Note: Truman organized the first American Legion post in Missouri, aided in organizing several others, and attended numerous annual conventions as a delegate.) In the general election, Truman defeated incumbent Republican Roscoe C. Patterson by nearly 20 percentage points in a continuing wave of pro-New Deal Democrats elected during the Great Depression.

Truman assumed office with a reputation as "the Senator from Pendergast". He referred patronage decisions to Pendergast but maintained that he voted with his own conscience. He later defended the patronage decisions by saying that "by offering a little to the machine, [he] saved a lot". In his first term, Truman spoke out against corporate greed and the dangers of Wall Street speculators and other moneyed special interests attaining too much influence in national affairs. Though he served on the high-profile Appropriations and Interstate Commerce Committees, he was largely ignored by President Roosevelt and had trouble getting calls returned from the White House.

During the U.S. Senate election in 1940, U.S. Attorney Maurice Milligan (former opponent Jacob Milligan's brother) and former governor Lloyd Stark both challenged Truman in the Democratic primary. Truman was politically weakened by Pendergast's imprisonment for income tax evasion the previous year; the senator had remained loyal, having claimed that Republican judges (not the Roosevelt administration) were responsible for the boss's downfall. St. Louis party leader Robert E. Hannegan's support of Truman proved crucial; he later brokered the deal that put Truman on the national ticket. In the end, Stark and Milligan split the anti-Pendergast vote in the Senate Democratic primary and Truman won by a total of 8,000 votes. In the November election, Truman defeated Republican Manvel H. Davis by 51–49 percent. As senator, Truman opposed both Nazi Germany and Communist Russia. Two days after Nazi Germany invaded the Soviet Union in June 1941, Truman said:

If we see that Germany is winning we ought to help Russia, and if Russia is winning we ought to help Germany, and that way let them kill as many as possible although I don't want to see Hitler victorious under any circumstances.

This quote without its last part later became a staple in Soviet and later Russian propaganda as "evidence" of an American conspiracy to destroy the country.

==== Truman Committee ====
In late 1940, Truman traveled to various military bases. The waste and profiteering he saw led him to use his chairmanship of the Committee on Military Affairs Subcommittee on War Mobilization to start investigations into abuses while the nation prepared for war. A new special committee was set up under Truman to conduct a formal investigation; the White House supported this plan rather than weather a more hostile probe by the House of Representatives. The main mission of the committee was to expose and fight waste and corruption in the gigantic government wartime contracts.

Truman's initiative convinced Senate leaders of the necessity for the committee, which reflected his demands for honest and efficient administration and his distrust of big business and Wall Street. Truman managed the committee "with extraordinary skill" and usually achieved consensus, generating heavy media publicity that gave him a national reputation. Activities of the Truman Committee ranged from criticizing the "dollar-a-year men" hired by the government, many of whom proved ineffective, to investigating a shoddily built New Jersey housing project for war workers. In March 1944, Truman attempted to probe the expensive Manhattan Project but was persuaded by Secretary of War Henry L. Stimson to discontinue with the investigation.

The committee reportedly saved as much as $15 billion (equivalent to $270 billion in 2025), and its activities put Truman on the cover of Time magazine. According to the Senate's historical minutes, in leading the committee, "Truman erased his earlier public image as an errand-runner for Kansas City politicos", and "no senator ever gained greater political benefits from chairing a special investigating committee than did Missouri's Harry S. Truman."

== Vice presidency (1945) ==
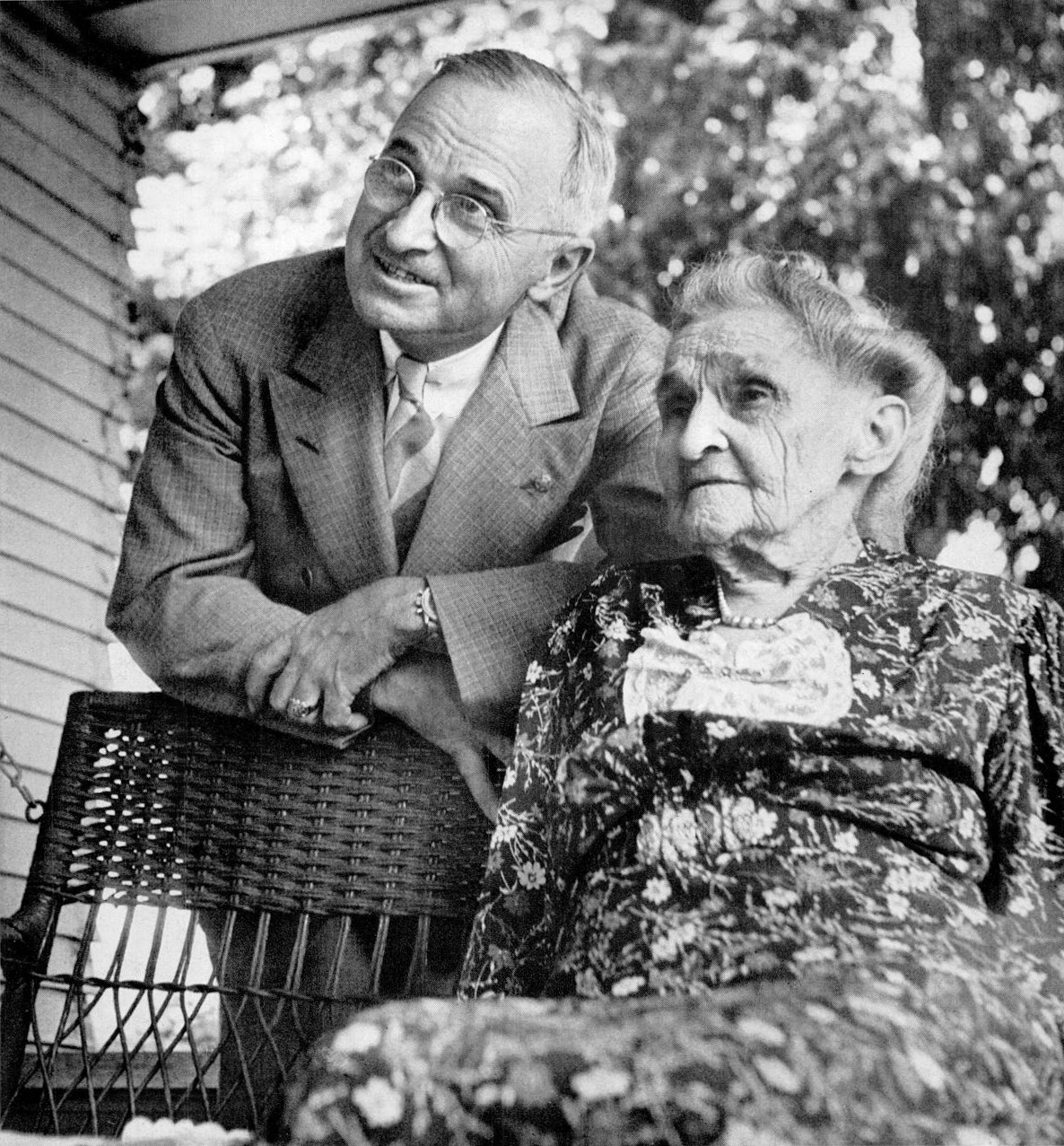
Truman visits his mother in Grandview, Missouri, after being nominated the Democratic candidate for vice president, July 1944.

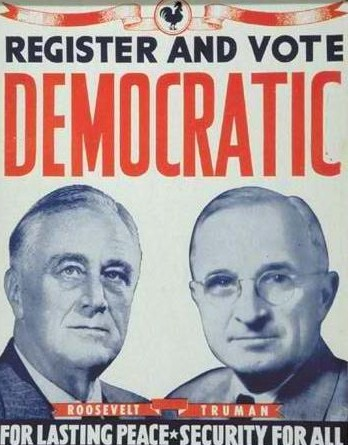
Roosevelt–Truman poster from 1944

Roosevelt's advisors knew that Roosevelt might not live out a fourth term and that his vice president would very likely become the next president. Henry A. Wallace had served as Roosevelt's vice president for four years and was popular on the left, but he was viewed as too far to the left and too friendly to labor for some of Roosevelt's advisers. The President and several of his confidantes wanted to replace Wallace with someone more acceptable to Democratic Party leaders. Outgoing Democratic National Committee chairman Frank C. Walker, incoming chairman Hannegan, party treasurer Edwin W. Pauley, Bronx party boss Ed Flynn, Chicago Mayor Edward Joseph Kelly, and lobbyist George E. Allen all wanted to keep Wallace off the ticket. Roosevelt told party leaders that he would accept either Truman or Supreme Court Justice William O. Douglas.

State and city party leaders strongly preferred Truman, and Roosevelt agreed. Truman had repeatedly said that he was not in the race and that he did not want the vice presidency, and he remained reluctant. One reason was that his wife and sister Mary Jane were both on his Senate staff payroll, and he feared negative publicity. Truman did not campaign for the vice-presidential spot, though he welcomed the attention as evidence that he had become more than the "Senator from Pendergast". Truman's nomination was dubbed the "Second Missouri Compromise" and was well received. The Roosevelt–Truman ticket achieved a 432–99 electoral-vote victory in the election, defeating the Republican ticket of Governor Thomas E. Dewey of New York and running mate Governor John Bricker of Ohio. Truman was sworn in as vice president on January 20, 1945. After the inauguration, Truman called his mother, who instructed him, "Now you behave yourself."

Truman's brief vice-presidency was relatively uneventful. Truman mostly presided over the Senate and attended parties and receptions. He kept the same offices from his Senate years, mostly using the Vice President's official office in the Capitol only to greet visitors. Truman was the first vice president to have a Secret Service agent assigned to him. Truman envisioned the office as a liaison between the Senate and the president. On April 10, 1945, Truman cast his only tie-breaking vote as president of the Senate, against a Robert A. Taft amendment that would have blocked the postwar delivery of Lend-Lease Act items contracted for during the war. Roosevelt rarely contacted him, even to inform him of major decisions; the president and vice president met alone together only twice during their time in office.

In one of his first acts as vice president, Truman created some controversy when he attended the disgraced Pendergast's funeral. He brushed aside the criticism, saying simply, "He was always my friend and I have always been his." He had rarely discussed world affairs or domestic politics with Roosevelt; he was uninformed about major initiatives relating to the war and the top-secret Manhattan Project, which was about to test the world's first atomic bomb. In an event that generated negative publicity for Truman, he was photographed with actress Lauren Bacall sitting atop the piano at the National Press Club as he played for soldiers.

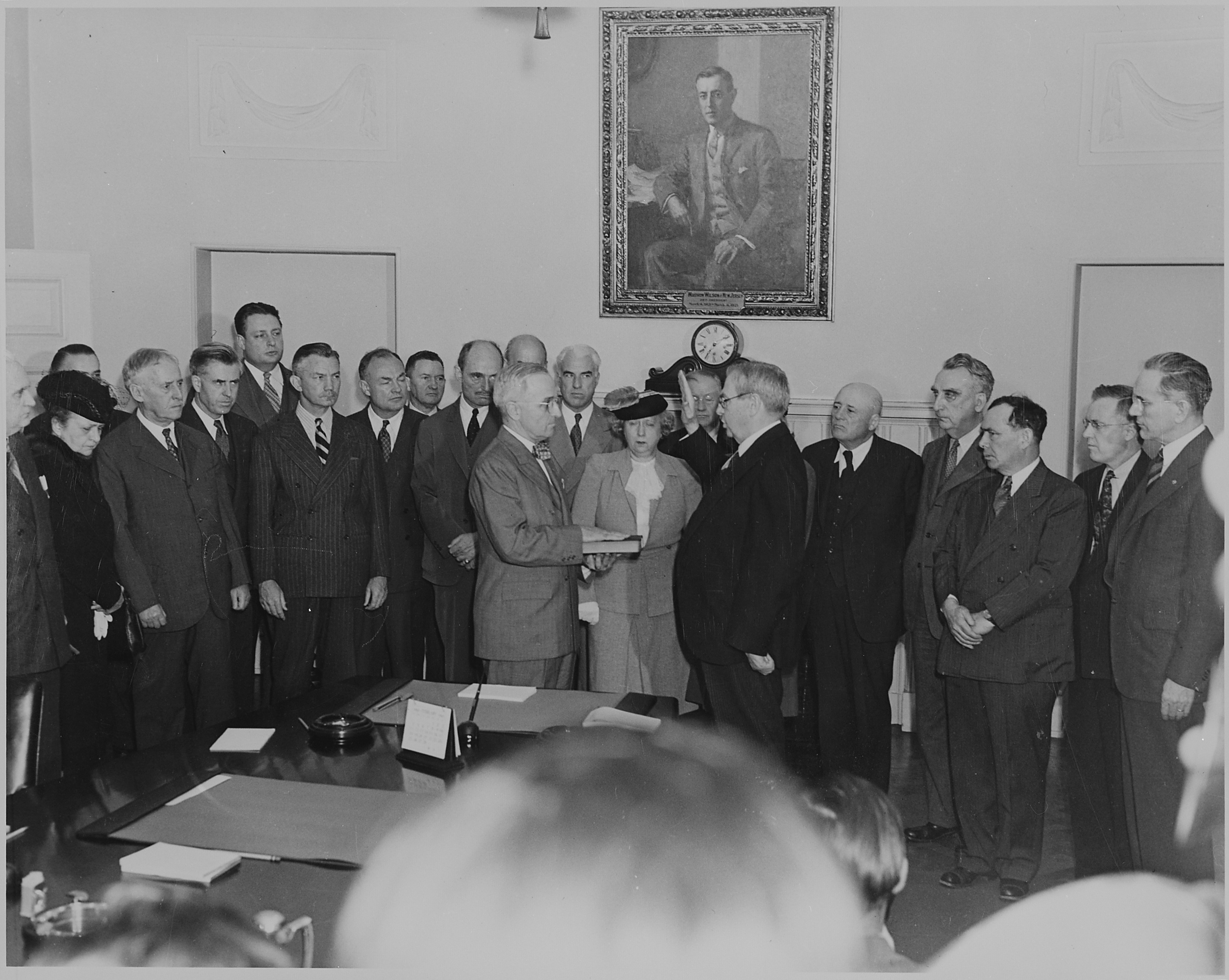
Vice President Truman was sworn in as president in the Cabinet Room at the White House a few hours after Roosevelt's death.

Truman had been vice president for 82 days when President Roosevelt died on April 12, 1945. Truman, presiding over the Senate, as usual, had just adjourned the session for the day and was preparing to have a drink in House Speaker Sam Rayburn's office when he received an urgent message to go immediately to the White House, where Eleanor Roosevelt told him that her husband had died after a massive cerebral hemorrhage. Truman asked her if there was anything he could do for her; she replied, "Is there anything we can do for you? For you are the one in trouble now!" He was sworn in as president at 7:09 p.m. in the West Wing of the White House, by Chief Justice Harlan F. Stone.

== Presidency (1945–1953) ==
At the White House, Truman replaced Roosevelt holdovers with old confidants. The White House was badly understaffed with no more than a dozen aides; they could barely keep up with the heavy workflow of a greatly expanded executive department. Truman acted as his own chief of staff on a daily basis, as well as his own liaison with Congress—a body he already knew very well. He was not well prepared to deal with the press, and never achieved the jovial familiarity of FDR. Filled with latent anger about all the setbacks in his career, he bitterly mistrusted journalists. He saw them as enemies lying in wait for his next careless miscue. Truman was a very hard worker, often to the point of exhaustion, which left him testy, easily annoyed, and on the verge of appearing unpresidential or petty. In terms of major issues, he discussed them in depth with top advisors. He mastered the details of the federal budget as well as anyone. Truman was a poor speaker reading a text. However, his visible anger made him an effective stump speaker, denouncing his enemies as his supporters hollered back at him "Give Em Hell, Harry!"

Truman surrounded himself with friends and appointed several to high positions that seemed beyond their competence, including his two secretaries of the treasury, Fred Vinson and John Snyder. His closest friend in the White House was his military aide Harry H. Vaughan, who knew little of military or foreign affairs and was criticized for trading access to the White House for expensive gifts. Truman loved to spend as much time as possible playing poker, telling stories and sipping bourbon. Alonzo Hamby notes that:

... to many in the general public, gambling and bourbon swilling, however low-key, were not quite presidential. Neither was the intemperant "give 'em hell" campaign style nor the occasional profane phrase uttered in public. Poker exemplified a larger problem: the tension between his attempts at an image of leadership necessarily a cut above the ordinary and an informality that at times appeared to verge on crudeness.

=== First term (1945–1949) ===
==== Assuming office ====
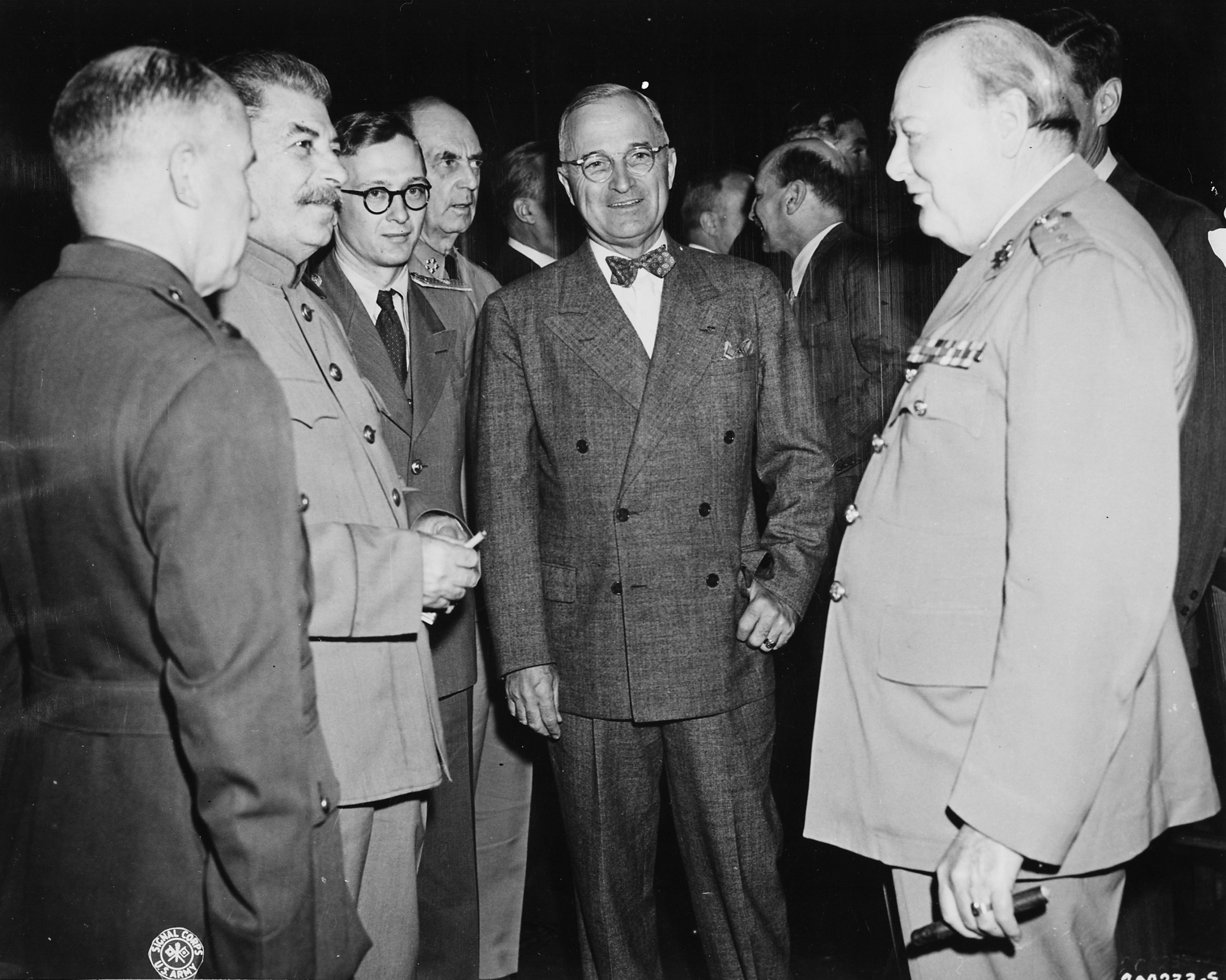
Joseph Stalin, Harry S. Truman, and Winston Churchill in Potsdam, July 1945

On his first full day, Truman told reporters: "Boys, if you ever pray, pray for me now. I don't know if you fellas ever had a load of hay fall on you, but when they told me what happened yesterday, I felt like the moon, the stars, and all the planets had fallen on me."

Truman asked all the members of Roosevelt's cabinet to remain in place, but he soon replaced almost all of them, especially with friends from his Senate days.

==== Dropping atomic bombs on Japan ====
Truman benefited from a honeymoon period from the success in defeating Nazi Germany in Europe and the nation celebrated V-E Day on May 8, 1945, his 61st birthday.

Although Truman was told briefly on the afternoon of April 12 that the United States had a new, highly destructive weapon, it was not until April 25 that Secretary of War Henry Stimson told him the details:

We have discovered the most terrible bomb in the history of the world. It may be the fire destruction prophesied in the Euphrates Valley Era, after Noah and his fabulous Ark.

— Harry Truman, writing about the atomic bomb in his diary on July 25, 1945

Truman journeyed to Berlin for the Potsdam Conference with Joseph Stalin and British prime minister Winston Churchill. He was there when he learned the Trinity test—the first atomic bomb—on July 16 had been successful. He hinted to Stalin that he was about to use a new kind of weapon against the Japanese. Though this was the first time the Soviets had been officially given information about the atomic bomb, Stalin was already aware of the bomb project—having learned about it through atomic espionage long before Truman did.

In August, the Japanese government refused surrender demands as specifically outlined in the Potsdam Declaration. With the invasion of Japan imminent, Truman approved the schedule for dropping the two available bombs. Truman maintained the position that attacking Japan with atomic bombs saved many lives on both sides; a military estimate for the invasion of Japan submitted to Truman by Herbert Hoover indicated that an invasion could take at least a year and result in 500,000 to 1,000,000 Allied casualties. A study done for the staff of Secretary of War Henry L. Stimson by William Shockley estimated that invading Japan would cost 1.7–4 million American casualties, including 400,000–800,000 fatalities, and five to ten million Japanese fatalities if Japanese civilians participated in the defense of Japan. The U.S. Army Service Forces estimated in their document "Redeployment of the United States Army after the Defeat of Germany" that between June 1945 and December 1946 the Army would be required to furnish replacements for 43,000 dead and evacuated wounded every month during this period. From analysis of the replacement schedule and projected strengths in overseas theaters, it suggested that Army losses alone in those categories, excluding the Navy and Marine Corps, would be approximately 863,000 through the first part of 1947, of whom 267,000 would be killed or missing. The Soviet Union declared war on Japan on August 9 and invaded Manchuria. Japan agreed to surrender the following day.

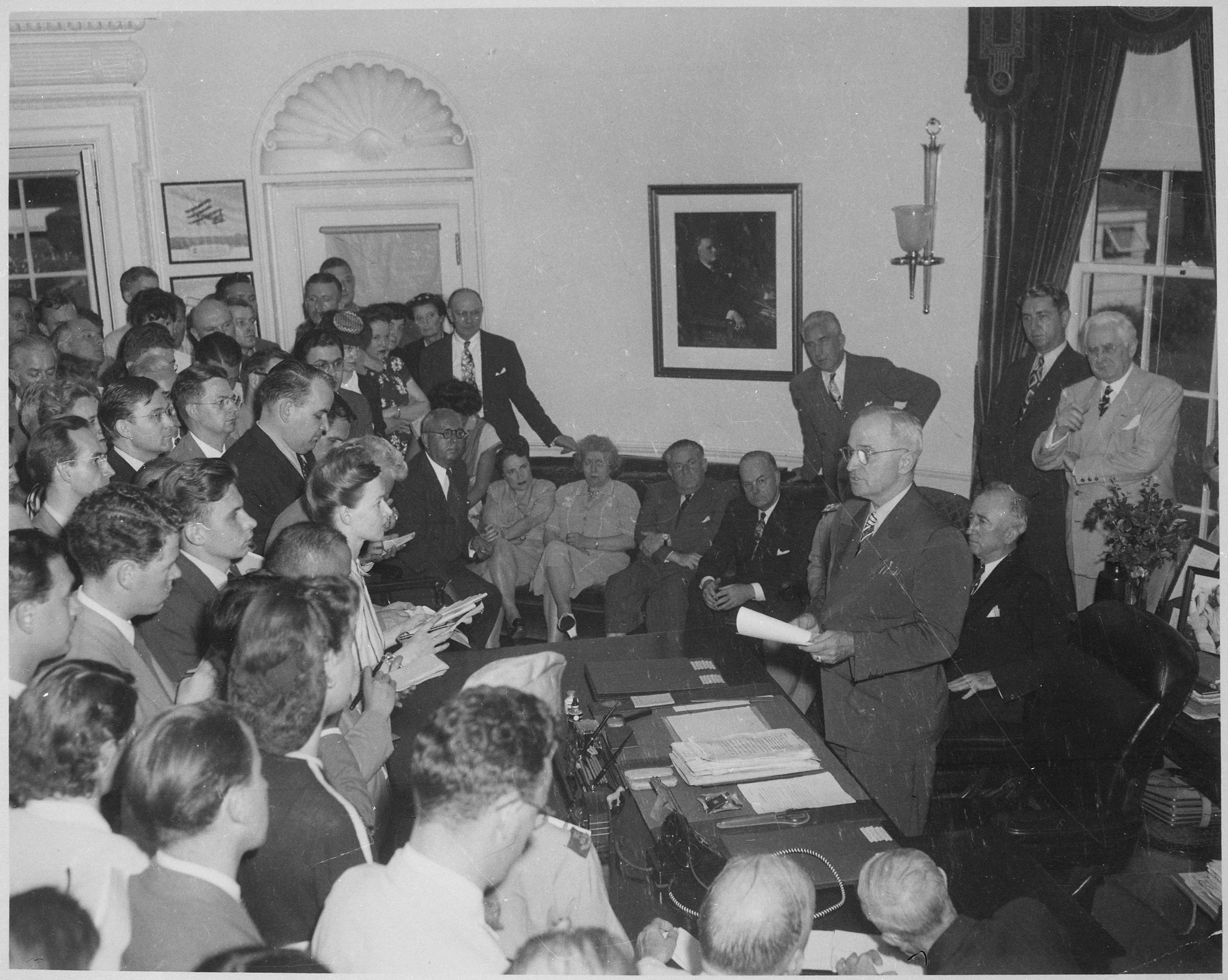
Truman announces Japan's surrender, August 14, 1945.

Supporters (Note: For example, see Fussell, Paul (1988). "Thank God for the Atomic Bomb". Thank God for the Atomic Bomb and Other Essays. New York Summit Books.) of Truman's decision argue that, given the tenacious Japanese defense of the outlying islands, the bombings saved hundreds of thousands of lives of Allied prisoners, Japanese civilians, and combatants on both sides that would have been lost in an invasion of Japan. Some modern criticism has argued that the use of nuclear weapons was unnecessary, given that conventional attacks or a demonstrative bombing of an uninhabited area might have forced Japan's surrender, and therefore assert that the attack constituted a crime of war. In 1948 Truman defended his decision to use atomic bombs:

As President of the United States, I had the fateful responsibility of deciding whether or not to use this weapon for the first time. It was the hardest decision I ever had to make. But the President cannot duck hard problems—he cannot pass the buck. I made the decision after discussions with the ablest men in our Government, and after long and prayerful consideration. I decided that the bomb should be used to end the war quickly and save countless lives—Japanese as well as American.

Truman continued to strongly defend himself in his memoirs in 1955–1956, stating many lives could have been lost had the United States invaded mainland Japan without the atomic bombs. In 1963, he stood by his decision, telling a journalist "it was done to save 125,000 youngsters on the U.S. side and 125,000 on the Japanese side from getting killed and that is what it did. It probably also saved a half million youngsters on both sides from being maimed for life."

==== Labor unions, strikes and economic issues ====
The end of World War II was followed by an uneasy transition from war to a peacetime economy. The costs of the war effort had been enormous, and Truman was intent on diminishing military services as quickly as possible to curtail the government's military expenditures. The effect of demobilization on the economy was unknown, proposals were met with skepticism and resistance, and fears existed that the nation would slide back into depression. In Roosevelt's final years, Congress began to reassert legislative power and Truman faced a congressional body where Republicans and conservative southern Democrats formed a powerful "conservative coalition" voting bloc. The New Deal had greatly strengthened labor unions and they formed a major base of support for Truman's Democratic Party. The Republicans, working with big business, made it their highest priority to weaken those unions. The unions had been promoted by the government during the war and tried to make their gains permanent through large-scale strikes in major industries. Meanwhile, price controls were slowly ending, and inflation was soaring. Truman's response to the widespread dissatisfaction was generally seen as ineffective.

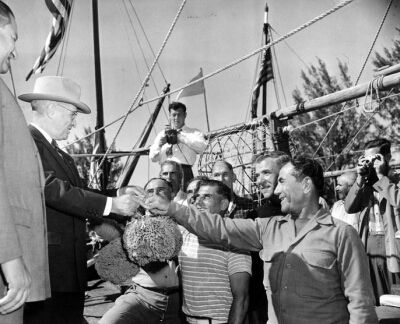
Truman with Greek American sponge divers in Florida, 1947

When a national rail strike threatened in May 1946, Truman seized the railroads in an attempt to contain the issue, but two key railway unions struck anyway. The entire national railroad system was shut down, immobilizing 24,000 freight trains and 175,000 passenger trains a day. For two days, public anger mounted. His staff prepared a speech that Truman read to Congress calling for a new law, whereby railroad strikers would be drafted into the army. As he concluded his address, he was handed a note that the strike had been settled on presidential terms; nevertheless, a few hours later, the House voted to draft the strikers. The bill died in the Senate.

==== Approval rating falls; Republicans win Congress in 1946 ====
The president's approval rating dropped from 82 percent in the polls in January 1946 to 52 percent by June. This dissatisfaction led to large Democratic losses in the 1946 midterm elections, and Republicans took control of Congress for the first time since 1930. When Truman dropped to 32 percent in the polls, Democratic Arkansas Senator William Fulbright suggested that Truman resign; the president said he did not care what Senator "Halfbright" said.

Truman cooperated closely with the Republican leaders on foreign policy but fought them bitterly on domestic issues. The power of the labor unions was significantly curtailed by the Taft–Hartley Act which was enacted over Truman's veto. Truman twice vetoed bills to lower income tax rates in 1947. Although the initial vetoes were sustained, Congress overrode his veto of a tax cut bill in 1948. In one notable instance of bipartisanship, Congress passed the Presidential Succession Act of 1947, which replaced the secretary of state with the Speaker of the House and the president pro tempore of the Senate as successor to the president after the vice president.

==== Proposes "Fair Deal" liberalism ====
As he readied for the 1948 election, Truman made clear his identity as a Democrat in the New Deal tradition, advocating for national health insurance, and repeal of the Taft–Hartley Act. He broke with the New Deal by initiating an aggressive civil rights program which he termed a moral priority. His economic and social vision constituted a broad legislative agenda that came to be called the "Fair Deal". Truman's proposals were not well received by Congress, even with renewed Democratic majorities in Congress after 1948. The Solid South rejected civil rights as those states still enforced segregation. Only one of the major Fair Deal bills, the Housing Act of 1949, was ever enacted. Many of the New Deal programs that persisted during Truman's presidency have since received minor improvements and extensions.

==== Marshall Plan, Cold War, and China ====
As a Wilsonian internationalist, Truman supported Roosevelt's policy in favor of the creation of the United Nations and included Eleanor Roosevelt on the delegation to the first UN General Assembly. With the Soviet Union expanding its sphere of influence through Eastern Europe, Truman and his foreign policy advisors took a hard line against the USSR. In this, he matched U.S. public opinion which quickly came to believe the Soviets were intent upon world domination.

Although he had little personal expertise on foreign matters, Truman listened closely to his top advisors, especially George Marshall and Dean Acheson. The Republicans controlled Congress in 1947–1948, so he worked with their leaders, especially Senator Arthur H. Vandenburg, chairman of the powerful Foreign Relations Committee. He won bipartisan support for both the Truman Doctrine, which formalized a policy of Soviet containment, and the Marshall Plan, which aimed to help rebuild postwar Europe.

To get Congress to spend the vast sums necessary to restart the moribund European economy, Truman used an ideological argument, arguing that communism flourishes in economically deprived areas. As part of the U.S. Cold War strategy, Truman signed the National Security Act of 1947 and reorganized military forces by merging the Department of War and the Department of the Navy into the National Military Establishment (later the Department of Defense) and creating the U.S. Air Force. The act also created the Central Intelligence Agency (CIA) and the National Security Council. On November 4, 1952, Truman authorized the official, though at the time, confidential creation of the National Security Agency (NSA).

Truman did not know what to do about China, where the Nationalists and Communists were fighting a large-scale civil war. The Nationalists had been major wartime allies and had large-scale popular support in the United States, along with a powerful lobby. General George Marshall spent most of 1946 in China trying to negotiate a compromise but failed. He convinced Truman the Nationalists would never win on their own and a very large-scale U.S. intervention to stop the Communists would significantly weaken U.S. opposition to the Soviets in Europe. By 1949, the Communists under Mao Zedong had won the civil war, the United States had a new enemy in Asia, and Truman came under fire from conservatives for "losing" China.

==== Berlin airlift ====
On June 24, 1948, the Soviet Union blocked access to the three Western-held sectors of Berlin. The Allies had not negotiated a deal to guarantee supply of the sectors deep within the Soviet-occupied zone. The commander of the U.S. occupation zone in Germany, General Lucius D. Clay, proposed sending a large armored column across the Soviet zone to West Berlin with instructions to defend itself if it were stopped or attacked. Truman believed this would entail an unacceptable risk of war. He approved Ernest Bevin's plan to supply the blockaded city by air.

On June 25, the Allies initiated the Berlin Airlift, a campaign to deliver food, coal and other supplies using military aircraft on a massive scale. Nothing like it had ever been attempted before, and no single nation had the capability, either logistically or materially, to accomplish it. The airlift worked; ground access was again granted on May 11, 1949. Nevertheless, the airlift continued for several months after that. The Berlin Airlift was one of Truman's great foreign policy successes; it significantly aided his election campaign in 1948.

==== Recognition of Israel ====
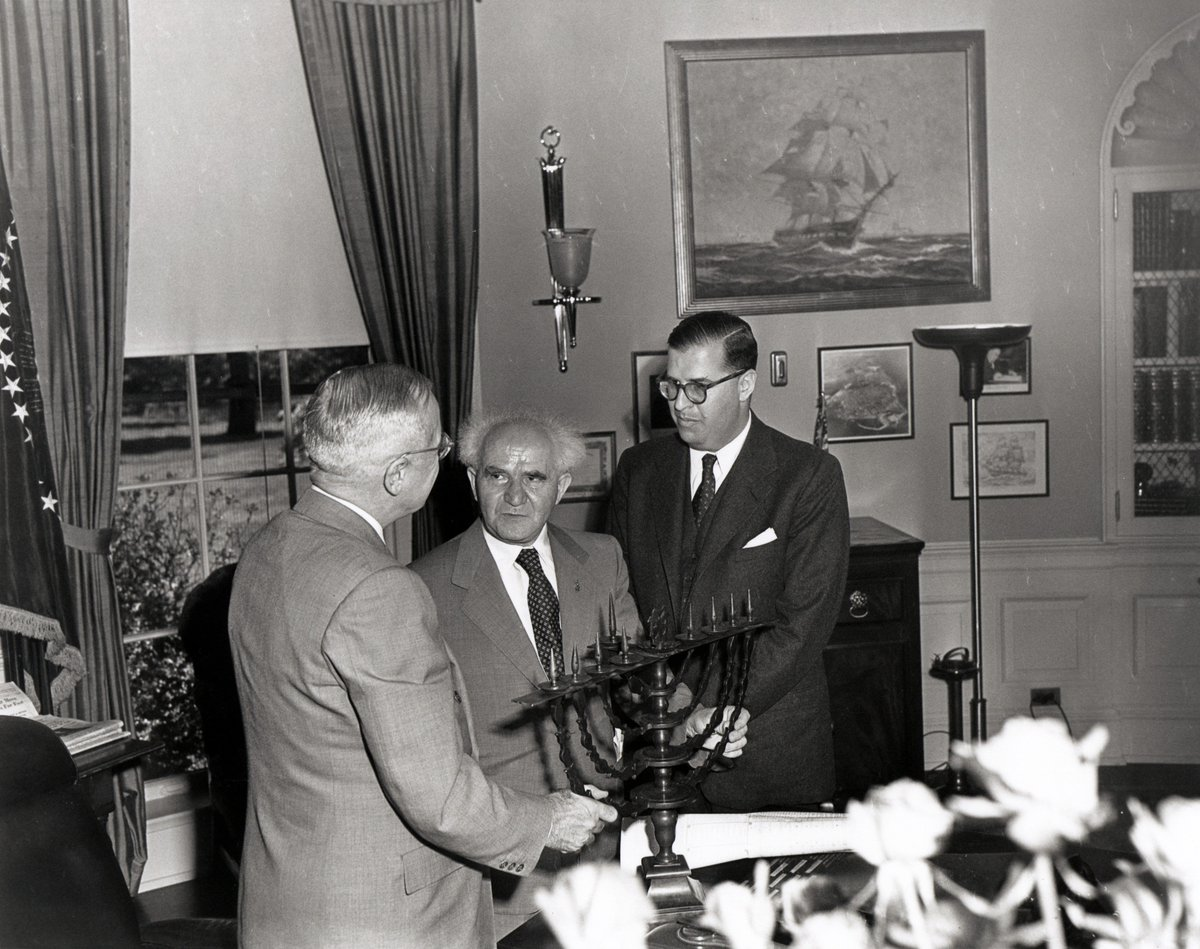
Truman in the Oval Office, receiving a Hanukkah Menorah from Israeli prime minister David Ben-Gurion (center). To the right is Abba Eban, ambassador of Israel to the United States.

Truman had long taken an interest in the history of the Middle East and was sympathetic to Jews who sought to re-establish their ancient homeland in Mandatory Palestine. As a senator, he announced support for Zionism; in 1943 he called for a homeland for those Jews who survived the Nazi regime. However, State Department officials were reluctant to offend the Arabs, who were opposed to the establishment of a Jewish state in the large region long populated and dominated culturally by Arabs. Secretary of Defense James Forrestal warned Truman of the importance of Saudi Arabian oil in another war; Truman replied he would decide his policy on the basis of justice, not oil. U.S. diplomats with experience in the region were opposed, but Truman told them he had few Arabs among his constituents.

Palestine was secondary to the goal of protecting the "Northern Tier" of Greece, Turkey, and Iran from communism, as promised by the Truman Doctrine. Weary of both the convoluted politics of the Middle East and pressure by Jewish leaders, Truman was undecided on his policy and skeptical about how the Jewish "underdogs" would handle power. He later cited as decisive in his recognition of the Jewish state the advice of his former business partner, Eddie Jacobson, a non-religious Jew whom Truman absolutely trusted.

Truman decided to recognize Israel over the objections of Secretary of State George Marshall, who feared it would hurt relations with the populous Arab states. Marshall believed the paramount threat to the United States was the Soviet Union and feared Arab oil would be lost to the United States in the event of war; he warned Truman the United States was "playing with fire with nothing to put it out". Truman recognized the State of Israel on May 14, 1948, eleven minutes after it declared itself a nation. Of his decision to recognize the Israeli state, Truman said in an interview years later: "Hitler had been murdering Jews right and left. I saw it, and I dream about it even to this day. The Jews needed some place where they could go. It is my attitude that the American government couldn't stand idly by while the victims [of] Hitler's madness are not allowed to build new lives."

==== Calls for civil rights ====
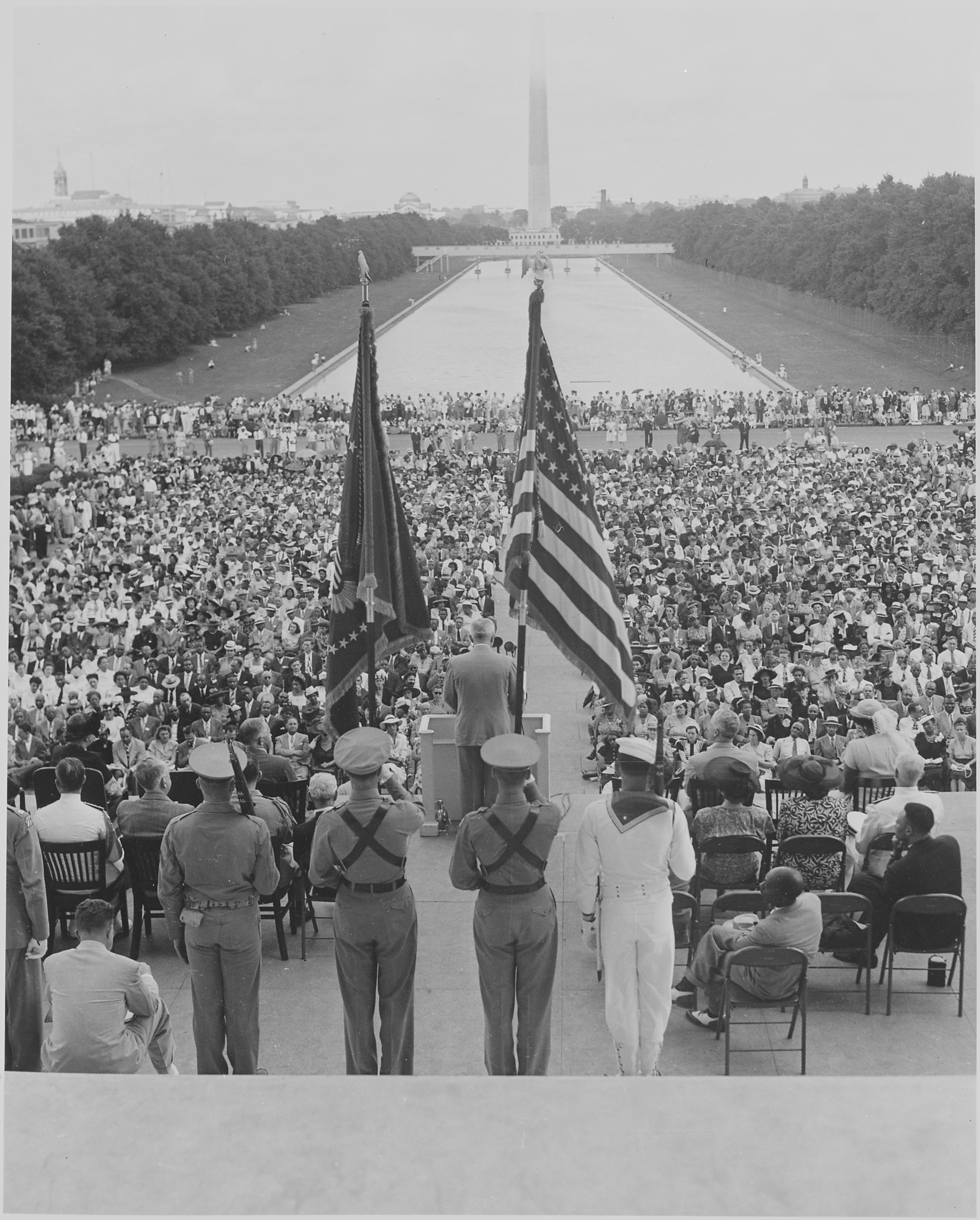
Truman addresses the NAACP at its 38th annual conference on the steps of the Lincoln Memorial, June 29, 1947.

Under his predecessor, Franklin D. Roosevelt, the Fair Employment Practices Committee was created to address racial discrimination in war-related work. Truman wanted to keep the committee in place after the war was over, though his attempts at doing so were unsuccessful. In 1946, Truman created the President's Committee on Civil Rights. On June 29, 1947, Truman became the first president to address the National Association for the Advancement of Colored People (NAACP). The speech took place at the Lincoln Memorial during the NAACP convention and was carried nationally on radio. In that speech, Truman laid out the need to end discrimination, which would be advanced by the first comprehensive, presidentially proposed civil rights legislation. Truman on "civil rights and human freedom", declared:

It is my deep conviction that we have reached a turning point in the long history of our country's efforts to guarantee freedom and equality to all our citizens ... it is more important today than ever before to ensure that all Americans enjoy these rights. ... When I say all Americans, I mean all Americans ... Our immediate task is to remove the last remnants of the barriers which stand between millions of our citizens and their birthright. There is no justifiable reason for discrimination because of ancestry, or religion, or race, or color. We must not tolerate such limitations on the freedom of any of our people and on their enjoyment of basic rights which every citizen in a truly democratic society must possess. Every man should have the right to a decent home, the right to an education, the right to adequate medical care, the right to a worthwhile job, the right to an equal share in making the public decisions through the ballot, and the right to a fair trial in a fair court. We must ensure that these rights – on equal terms – are enjoyed by every citizen. To these principles I pledge my full and continued support. Many of our people still suffer the indignity of insult, the harrowing fear of intimidation, and, I regret to say, the threat of physical injury and mob violence. Prejudice and intolerance in which these evils are rooted still exist. The conscience of our nation, and the legal machinery which enforces it, have not yet secured to each citizen full freedom from fear.

In February 1948, Truman delivered a formal message to Congress requesting adoption of his 10-point program to secure civil rights, including anti-lynching, voter rights, and elimination of segregation. "No political act since the Compromise of 1877," argued biographer Taylor Branch, "so profoundly influenced race relations; in a sense it was a repeal of 1877."

=== 1948 election ===
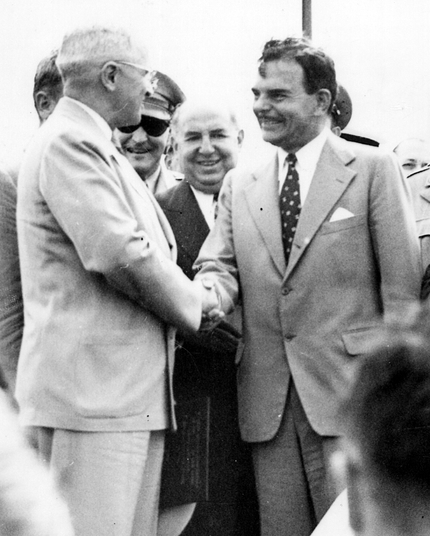
President Truman (left) with Governor Dewey (right) at dedication of Idlewild Airport in New York City on July 31, 1948. This was their first meeting since being nominated as presidential candidates by their parties.

The 1948 presidential election is remembered for Truman's stunning come-from-behind victory. In the spring of 1948, Truman's public approval rating stood at 36 percent, and the president was nearly universally regarded as incapable of winning the general election. At the 1948 Democratic National Convention, Truman attempted to unify the party with a vague civil rights plank in the party platform. His intention was to assuage the internal conflicts between the northern and southern wings of his party. Events overtook his efforts. A sharp address given by Mayor Hubert Humphrey of Minneapolis—as well as the local political interests of a number of urban bosses—convinced the convention to adopt a stronger civil rights plank, which Truman approved wholeheartedly. Truman delivered an aggressive acceptance speech attacking the 80th Congress, which Truman called the "Do Nothing Congress", and promising to win the election and "make these Republicans like it".

Republicans approve of the American farmer, but they are willing to help him go broke. They stand four-square for the American home—but not for housing. They are strong for labor—but they are stronger for restricting labor's rights. They favor minimum wage—the smaller the minimum wage the better. They endorse educational opportunity for all—but they won't spend money for teachers or for schools. They think modern medical care and hospitals are fine—for people who can afford them ... They think American standard of living is a fine thing—so long as it doesn't spread to all the people. And they admire the Government of the United States so much that they would like to buy it.

— Harry S. Truman, October 13, 1948, St. Paul, Minnesota, Radio Broadcast

Within two weeks of the 1948 convention Truman issued Executive Order 9981, ending racial discrimination in the Armed Services, and Executive Order 9980 to end discrimination in federal agencies. Truman took a considerable political risk in backing civil rights, and many seasoned Democrats were concerned the loss of Dixiecrat support might seriously weaken the party. South Carolina Governor Strom Thurmond, a segregationist, declared his candidacy for the presidency on a Dixiecrat ticket and led a full-scale revolt of Southern "states' rights" proponents. This rebellion on the right was matched by one on the left, led by Wallace on the Progressive Party ticket. The Democratic Party was splitting three ways and victory in November seemed unlikely. For his running mate, Truman accepted Kentucky Senator Alben W. Barkley, though he really wanted Justice William O. Douglas, who turned down the nomination.

Truman's political advisors described the political scene as "one unholy, confusing cacophony." They told Truman to speak to the people in a personal way. Campaign manager William J. Bray said Truman took this advice, and spoke personally and passionately, sometimes even setting aside his notes to talk to Americans "of everything that is in my heart and soul."

The campaign was a 21,928-mile (35,290 km) presidential odyssey. In a personal appeal to the nation, Truman crisscrossed the United States by train; his "whistle stop" speeches from the rear platform of the presidential car, Ferdinand Magellan, came to represent his campaign. His combative appearances captured the popular imagination and drew huge crowds. Six stops in Michigan drew a combined half-million people; a full million turned out for a New York City ticker-tape parade.

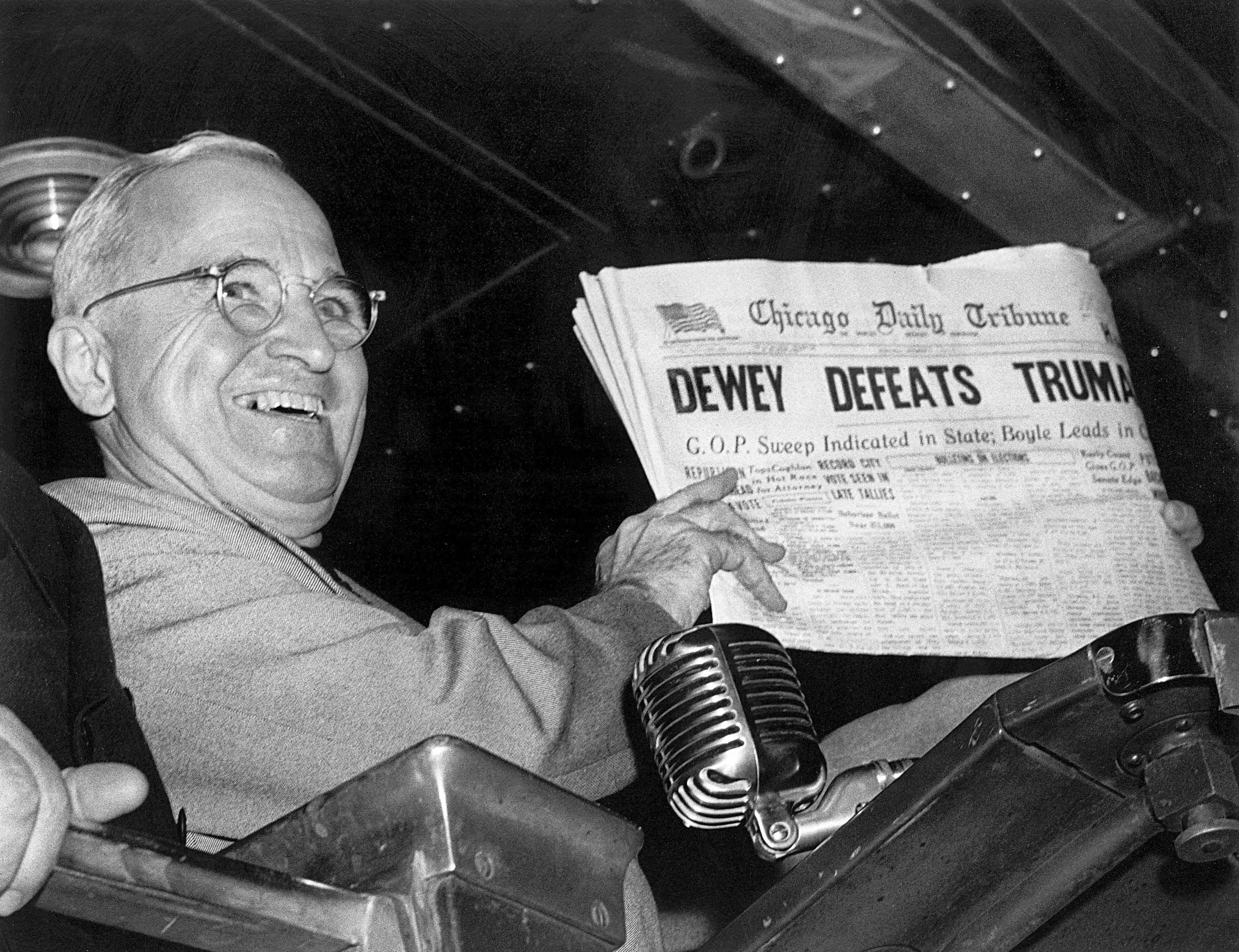
Truman was so widely expected to lose the 1948 election that the Chicago Tribune printed early editions with this erroneous headline before final voting results were known.

The large crowds at Truman's whistle-stop events were an important sign of a change in momentum in the campaign, but this shift went virtually unnoticed by the national press corps. It continued reporting Republican Thomas Dewey's apparent impending victory as a certainty. The three major polling organizations stopped polling well before the November 2 election date—Roper in September, and Crossley and Gallup in October—thus failing to measure the period when Truman appears to have surged past Dewey.

In the end, Truman held his progressive Midwestern base, won most of the Southern states despite the civil rights plank, and squeaked through with narrow victories in a few critical states, notably Ohio, California, and Illinois. The final tally showed the president had secured 303 electoral votes, Dewey 189, and Thurmond only 39. Henry Wallace got none. The defining image of the campaign came after Election Day, when an ecstatic Truman held aloft the erroneous front page of the Chicago Tribune with a huge headline proclaiming "Dewey Defeats Truman."

=== Second term (1949–1953) ===
Truman's second inauguration on January 20, 1949, was the first ever televised nationally.

==== Hydrogen bomb decision ====
The Soviet Union's atomic bomb project progressed much faster than had been expected, and they detonated their first bomb on August 29, 1949. Over the next several months there was an intense debate that split the U.S. government, military, and scientific communities regarding whether to proceed with the development of the far more powerful hydrogen bomb. The debate touched on matters from technical feasibility to strategic value to the morality of creating a massively destructive weapon. On January 31, 1950, Truman made the decision to go forward on the grounds that if the Soviets could make an H-bomb, the United States must do so as well and stay ahead in the nuclear arms race. The development achieved fruition with the first U.S. H-bomb test on October 31, 1952, which was officially announced by Truman on January 7, 1953.

==== Korean War ====
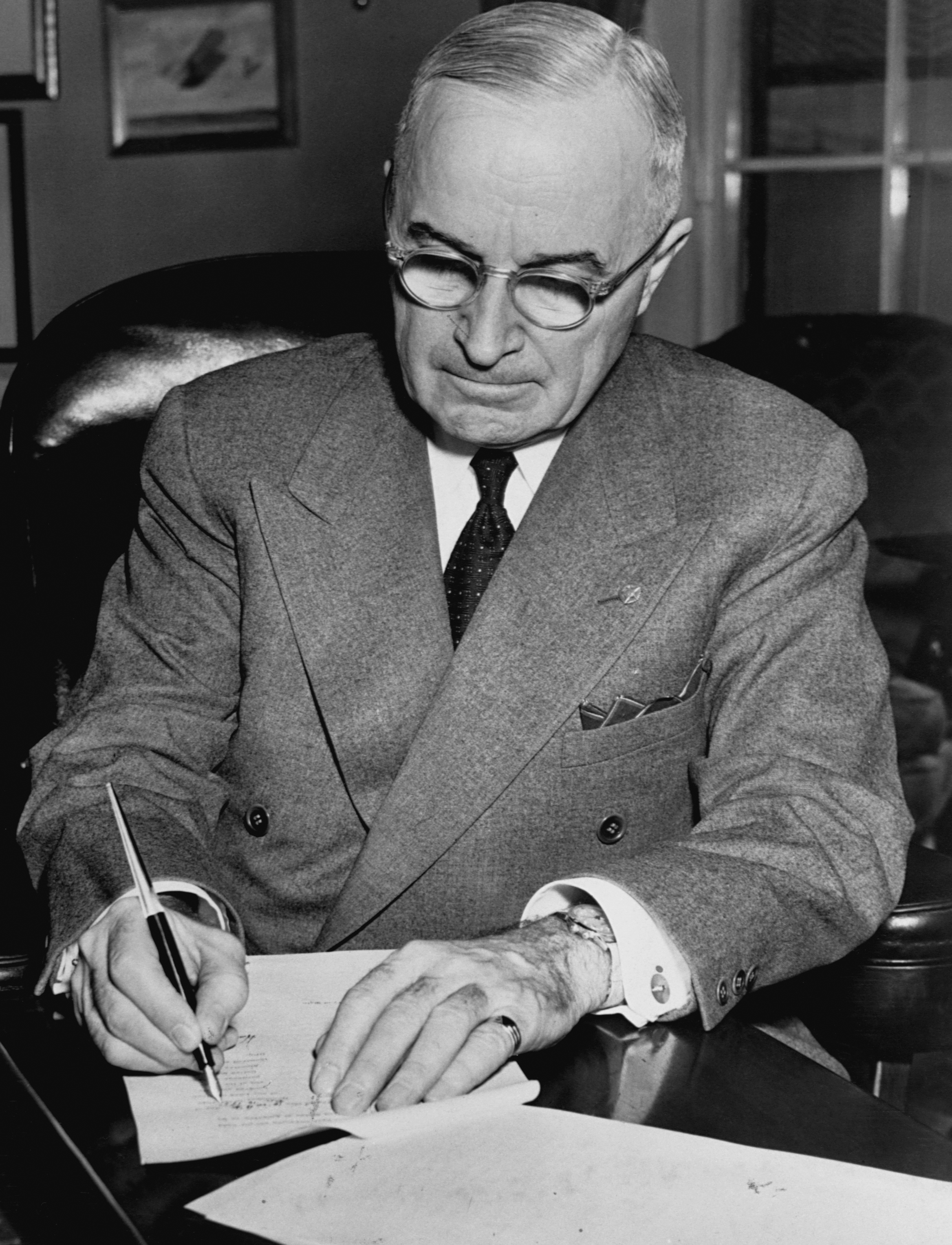
President Truman signing a proclamation declaring a national emergency and authorizing U.S. entry into the Korean War

On June 25, 1950, the North Korean army under Kim Il-sung invaded South Korea, starting the Korean War. In the early weeks of the war, the North Koreans easily pushed back their southern counterparts. Truman called for a naval blockade of Korea, only to learn that due to budget cutbacks, the U.S. Navy could not enforce such a measure.

Truman promptly urged the United Nations to intervene; it did, authorizing troops under the UN flag led by U.S. General Douglas MacArthur. Truman decided he did not need formal authorization from Congress, believing that most legislators supported his position; this would come back to haunt him later when the stalemated conflict was dubbed "Mr. Truman's War" by legislators. Rockoff writes that "President Truman responded quickly to the June invasion by authorizing the use of U.S. troops and ordering air strikes and a naval blockade. He did not, however, seek a declaration of war, or call for full mobilization, in part because such actions might have been misinterpreted by Russia and China. Instead, on July 19 he called for partial mobilization and asked Congress for an appropriation of $10 billion for the war." Cohen writes that: "All of Truman's advisers saw the events in Korea as a test of American will to resist Soviet attempts to expand their power, and their system. The United States ordered warships to the Taiwan Strait to prevent Mao's forces from invading Taiwan and mopping up the remnants of Chiang Kai-shek's army there."

However, on July 3, 1950, Truman did give Senate Majority Leader Scott W. Lucas a draft resolution titled "Joint Resolution Expressing Approval of the Action Taken in Korea". Lucas stated Congress supported the use of force, the formal resolution would pass but was unnecessary, and the consensus in Congress was to acquiesce. Truman responded he did not want "to appear to be trying to get around Congress and use extra-Constitutional powers", and added that it was "up to Congress whether such a resolution should be introduced".

I fired him [MacArthur] because he wouldn't respect the authority of the President ... I didn't fire him because he was a dumb son of a bitch, although he was, but that's not against the law for generals. If it was, half to three-quarters of them would be in jail.

— Truman to biographer Merle Miller, 1972, posthumously quoted in Time magazine, 1973

By August 1950, U.S. troops pouring into South Korea under UN auspices were able to stabilize the situation. Responding to criticism over readiness, Truman fired his secretary of defense, Louis A. Johnson, replacing him with the retired General Marshall. With UN approval, Truman decided on a "rollback" policy—liberation of North Korea. UN forces led by General Douglas MacArthur led the counterattack, scoring a stunning surprise victory with an amphibious landing at the Battle of Inchon that nearly trapped the invaders. UN forces marched north, toward the Yalu River boundary with China, with the goal of reuniting Korea under UN auspices.

China surprised the UN forces with a large-scale invasion in November. The UN forces were forced back to below the 38th parallel, then recovered. By early 1951 the war became a fierce stalemate at about the 38th parallel where it had begun. Truman rejected MacArthur's request to attack Chinese supply bases north of Yalu, but MacArthur promoted his plan to Republican House leader Joseph Martin, who leaked it to the press. Truman was gravely concerned further escalation of the war might lead to open conflict with the Soviet Union, which was already supplying weapons and providing warplanes (with Korean markings and Soviet aircrew). Therefore, on April 11, 1951, Truman fired MacArthur from his commands.

The dismissal of General Douglas MacArthur was among the least politically popular decisions in presidential history. Truman's approval ratings plummeted, and he faced calls for his impeachment from, among others, Senator Robert A. Taft. Fierce criticism from virtually all quarters accused Truman of refusing to shoulder the blame for a war gone sour and blaming his generals instead. Others, including Eleanor Roosevelt and all of the Joint Chiefs of Staff, publicly supported Truman's decision. MacArthur meanwhile returned to the United States to a hero's welcome, and addressed a joint session of Congress, a speech the president called "a bunch of damn bullshit."

Truman and his generals considered the use of nuclear weapons against the Chinese army, but ultimately chose not to escalate the war to a nuclear level. The war remained a frustrating stalemate for two years, with over 30,000 Americans killed, until an armistice ended the fighting in 1953. In February 1952, Truman's approval mark stood at 22 percent according to Gallup polls, which is the all-time lowest approval mark for a sitting U.S. president, though it was matched by Richard Nixon in 1974.

==== Worldwide defense ====
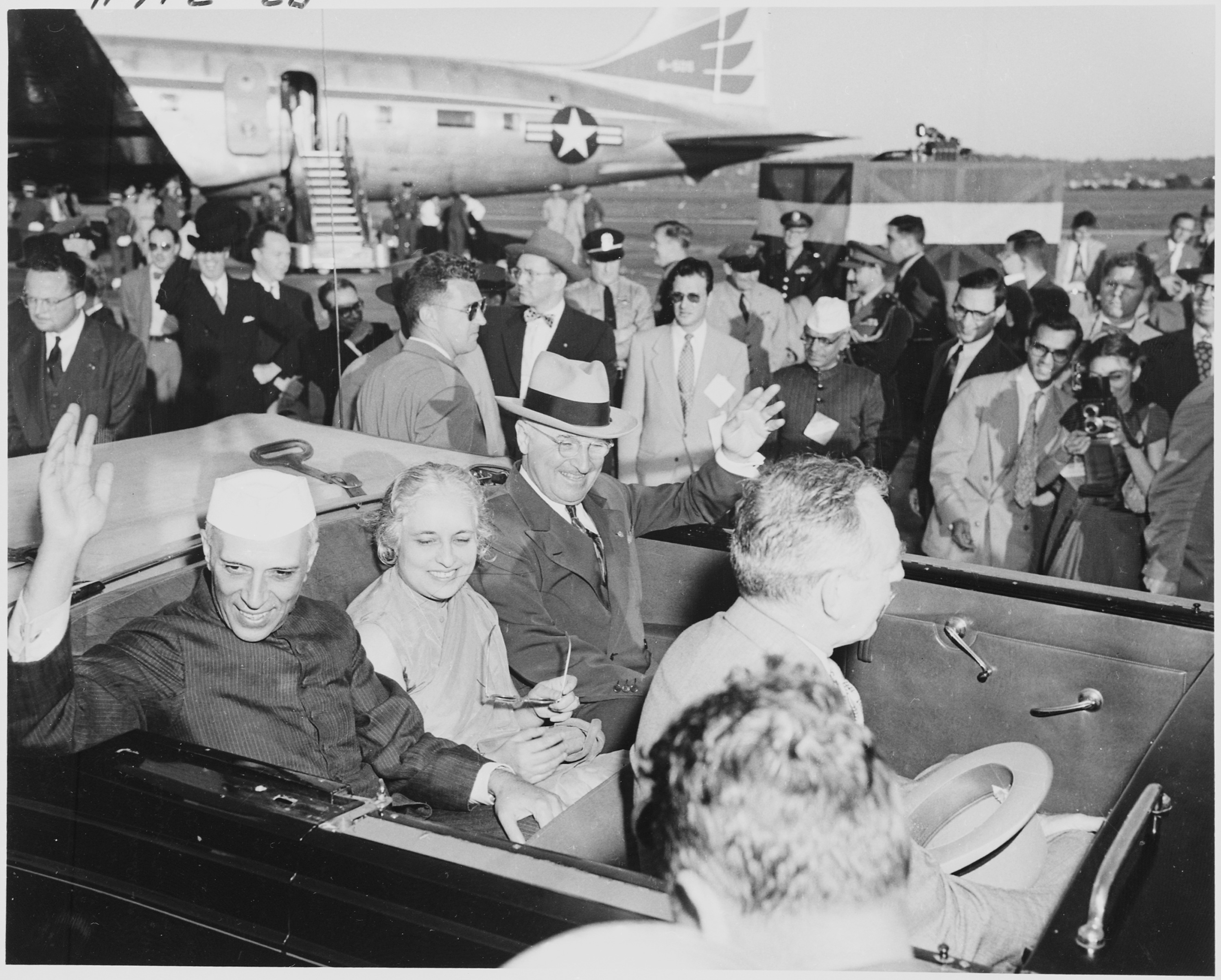
Truman and Indian prime minister Jawaharlal Nehru during Nehru's visit to the United States, October 1949

The escalation of the Cold War was highlighted by Truman's approval of NSC 68, a secret statement of foreign policy. It called for tripling the defense budget, and the globalization and militarization of containment policy whereby the United States and its NATO allies would respond militarily to actual Soviet expansion. The document was drafted by Paul Nitze, who consulted State and Defense officials and was formally approved by President Truman as the official national strategy after the war began in Korea. It called for partial mobilization of the U.S. economy to build armaments faster than the Soviets. The plan called for strengthening Europe, weakening the Soviet Union, and building up the United States both militarily and economically.

Truman was a strong supporter of the North Atlantic Treaty Organization (NATO), which established a formal peacetime military alliance with Canada and democratic European nations of the Western Bloc following World War II. The treaty establishing it was widely popular and easily passed the Senate in 1949; Truman appointed General Dwight D. Eisenhower as commander. NATO's goals were to contain Soviet expansion in Europe and to send a clear message to communist leaders that the world's democracies were willing and able to build new security structures in support of democratic ideals. The United States, Britain, France, Italy, the Netherlands, Belgium, Luxembourg, Norway, Denmark, Portugal, Iceland, and Canada were the original treaty signatories. The alliance resulted in the Soviets establishing a similar alliance, called the Warsaw Pact.

General Marshall was Truman's principal adviser on foreign policy matters, influencing such decisions as the U.S. choice against offering military aid to Chiang Kai-shek and his nationalist Chinese forces in the Chinese Civil War against their communist opponents. Marshall's opinion was contrary to the counsel of almost all of Truman's other advisers; Marshall thought propping up Chiang's forces would drain U.S. resources necessary for Europe to deter the Soviets. When the communists took control of the mainland, establishing the People's Republic of China and driving the nationalists to Taiwan, Truman would have been willing to maintain some relationship between the United States and the new government, but Mao was unwilling. Truman announced on January 5, 1950, that the United States would not engage in any dispute involving the Taiwan Strait, and that he would not intervene in the event of an attack by the PRC.

On June 27, 1950, after the outbreak of fighting in Korea, Truman ordered the U.S. Navy's Seventh Fleet into the Taiwan Strait to prevent further conflict between the communist government on the China mainland and the Republic of China (ROC) in Taiwan.

Truman usually worked well with his top staff – the exceptions were Israel in 1948 and Spain in 1945–1950. Truman was a very strong opponent of Francisco Franco, the right-wing dictator of Spain. He withdrew the American ambassador (but diplomatic relations were not formally broken), kept Spain out of the UN, and rejected any Marshall Plan financial aid to Spain. However, as the Cold War escalated, support for Spain was strong in Congress, the Pentagon, the business community and other influential elements especially Catholics and cotton growers.

Liberal opposition to Spain had faded after the Wallace element broke with the Democratic Party in 1948; the CIO became passive on the issue. As Secretary of State Acheson increased his pressure on Truman, the president stood alone in his administration as his own top appointees wanted to normalize relations. When China entered the Korean War and pushed American forces back, the argument for allies became irresistible. Admitting he was "overruled and worn down", Truman relented and sent an ambassador and made loans available.

==== Soviet espionage and McCarthyism ====
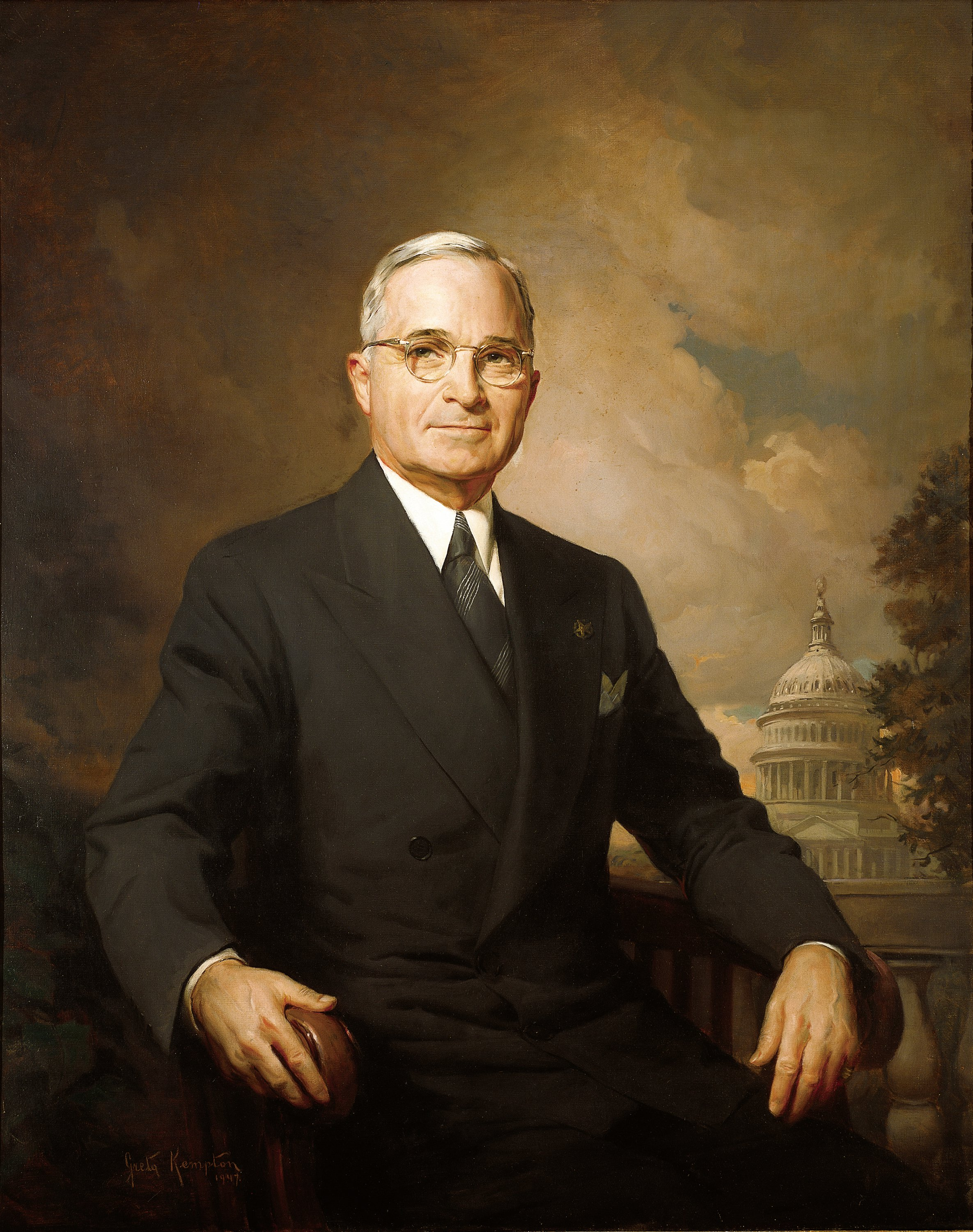
Official portrait of President Truman by Greta Kempton, 1947

In August 1948, Whittaker Chambers, a former spy for the Soviets and a senior editor at Time magazine, testified before the House Un-American Activities Committee (HUAC). He said an underground communist network had worked inside the U.S. government during the 1930s, of which Chambers had been a member, along with Alger Hiss, until recently a senior State Department official. Chambers did not allege any spying during the Truman presidency. Although Hiss denied the allegations, he was convicted in January 1950 for perjury for denials under oath.

The Soviet Union's success in exploding an atomic weapon in 1949 and the fall of the nationalist Chinese the same year led many Americans to conclude subversion by Soviet spies was responsible and to demand that communists be rooted out from the government and other places of influence. Hoping to contain these fears, Truman began a "loyalty program" with Executive Order 9835 in 1947. However, Truman got himself into deeper trouble when he called the Hiss trial a "red herring". Wisconsin Senator Joseph McCarthy accused the State Department of harboring communists and rode the controversy to political fame, leading to the Second Red Scare, also known as McCarthyism. McCarthy's stifling accusations made it difficult to speak out against him. This led Truman to call McCarthy "the greatest asset the Kremlin has" by "torpedo[ing] the bipartisan foreign policy of the United States."

Charges that Soviet agents had infiltrated the government were believed by 78 percent of the people in 1946 and became a major campaign issue for Eisenhower in 1952. Truman was reluctant to take a more radical stance, because he felt it could threaten civil liberties and add to a potential hysteria. At the same time, he felt political pressure to indicate a strong national security. It is unclear to what extent President Truman was briefed of the Venona intercepts, which discovered widespread evidence of Soviet espionage on the atom bomb project and afterward. Truman continued his own loyalty program for some time while believing the issue of communist espionage was overstated. In 1949, Truman described American communist leaders, whom his administration was prosecuting, as "traitors". Truman would later state in private conversations with friends that his creation of a loyalty program had been a "terrible" mistake.

In 1950, Truman vetoed the McCarran Internal Security Act, which was passed by Congress just after the start of the Korean War and was aimed at controlling communists in America. Truman called the Act "the greatest danger to freedom of speech, press, and assembly since the Alien and Sedition Laws of 1798", a "mockery of the Bill of Rights" and a "long step toward totalitarianism". His veto was immediately overridden by Congress and the Act became law. In the mid-1960s, parts of the Act were found to be unconstitutional by the United States Supreme Court.

==== Blair House and assassination attempt ====
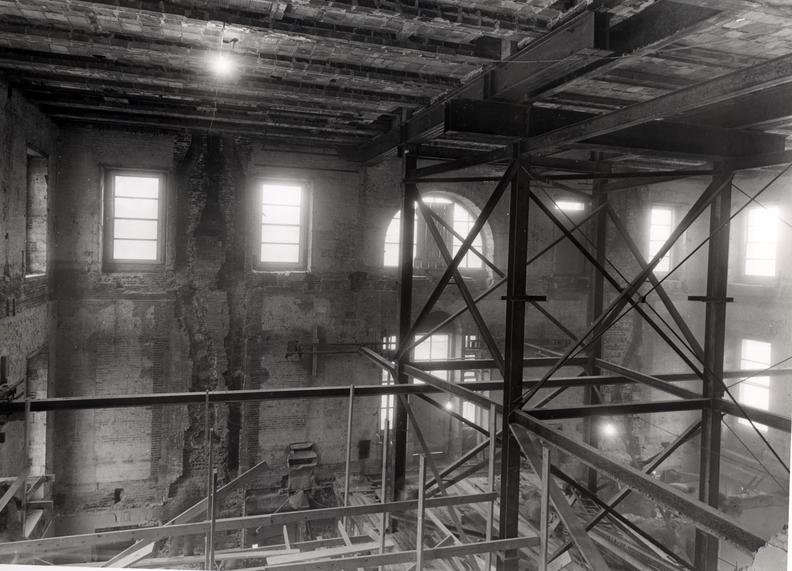
View of the interior shell of the White House during renovation in 1950

In 1948, Truman ordered an addition to the exterior of the White House: a second-floor balcony in the south portico, which came to be known as the Truman Balcony. The addition was unpopular. Some said it spoiled the appearance of the south facade, but it gave the First Family more living space. Meanwhile, structural deterioration and a near-imminent collapse of the White House led to a comprehensive dismantling and rebuilding of the building's interior from 1949 to 1952. Architectural and engineering investigations during 1948 deemed it unsafe for occupancy. Truman, his family, and the entire residence staff were relocated across the street into Blair House during the renovations. As the newer West Wing, including the Oval Office, remained open, Truman walked to and from his work across the street each morning and afternoon.

External videos
- Newsreel scenes in English of the assassination attempt on U.S. President Harry S. Truman

On November 1, 1950, Puerto Rican nationalists Griselio Torresola and Oscar Collazo attempted to assassinate Truman at Blair House. On the street outside the residence, Torresola mortally wounded a White House policeman, Leslie Coffelt. Before he died, the officer shot and killed Torresola. Collazo was wounded and stopped before he entered the house. He was found guilty of murder and sentenced to death in 1952. Truman commuted his sentence to life in prison. To try to settle the question of Puerto Rican independence, Truman allowed a plebiscite in Puerto Rico in 1952 to determine the status of its relationship to the United States. Nearly 82 percent of the people voted in favor of a new constitution for the Estado Libre Asociado, a continued 'associated free state.'

==== Steel and coal strikes ====
In response to a labor/management impasse arising from bitter disagreements over wage and price controls, Truman instructed his Secretary of Commerce, Charles W. Sawyer, to take control of a number of the nation's steel mills in April 1952. Truman cited his authority as commander in chief and the need to maintain an uninterrupted supply of steel for munitions for the war in Korea. The Supreme Court found Truman's actions unconstitutional, however, and reversed the order in a major separation-of-powers decision, Youngstown Sheet & Tube Co. v. Sawyer (1952). The 6–3 decision, which held that Truman's assertion of authority was too vague and was not rooted in any legislative action by Congress, was delivered by a court composed entirely of justices appointed by either Truman or Roosevelt. The high court's reversal of Truman's order was one of the notable defeats of his presidency.

==== Scandals and controversies ====
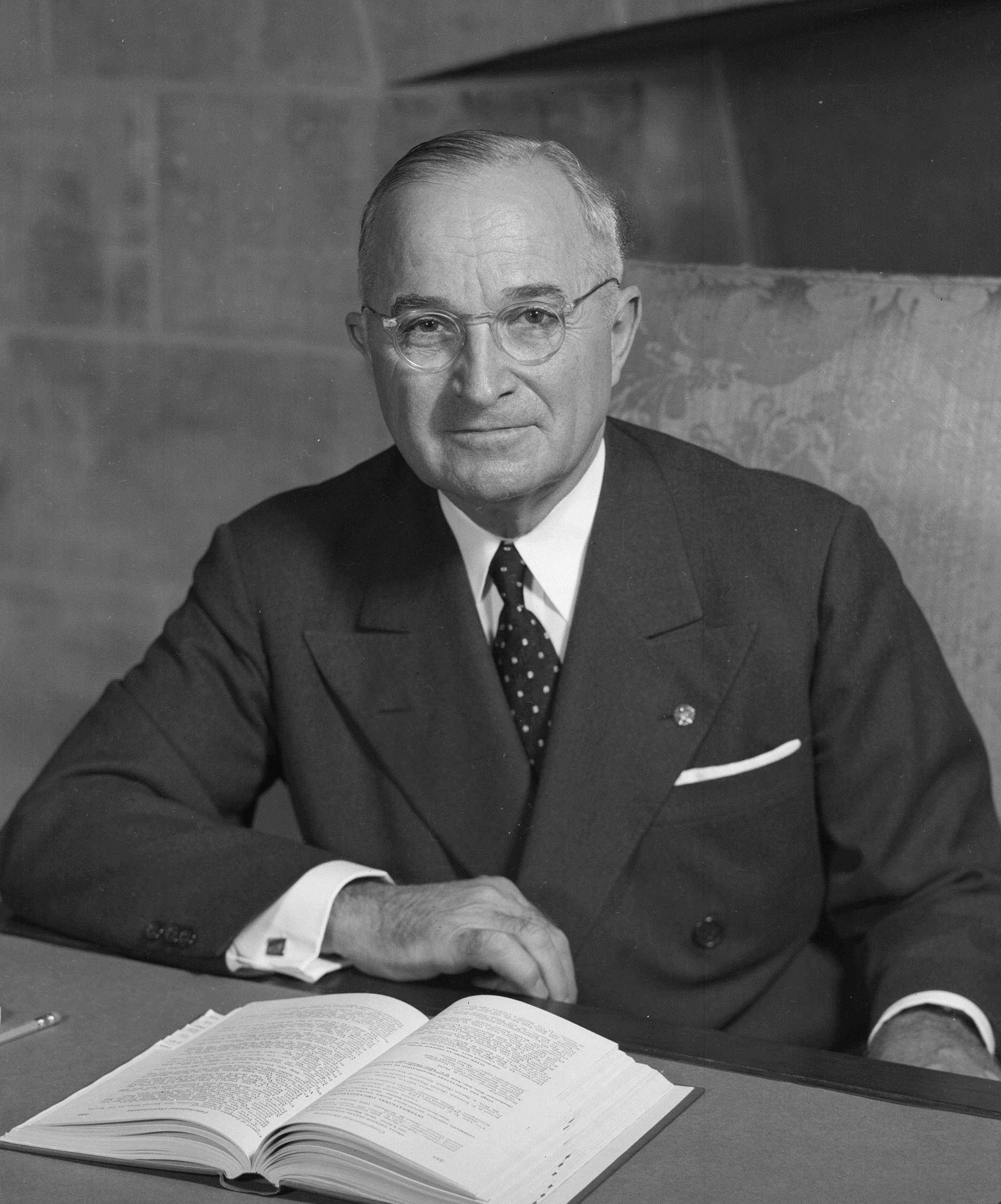
Truman in an official portrait

In 1950, the Senate, led by Estes Kefauver, investigated numerous charges of corruption among senior administration officials, some of whom had received fur coats and deep freezers in exchange for favors. A large number of employees of the Internal Revenue Bureau (today the IRS) were accepting bribes; 166 employees either resigned or were fired in 1950, with many soon facing indictment. When Attorney General J. Howard McGrath fired the special prosecutor in early 1952 for being too zealous, Truman fired McGrath. Truman submitted a reorganization plan to reform the IRB; Congress passed it, but corruption was a major issue in the 1952 presidential election.

On December 6, 1950, Washington Post music critic Paul Hume wrote a critical review of a concert by the president's daughter Margaret Truman:

Miss Truman is a unique American phenomenon with a pleasant voice of little size and fair quality ... [she] cannot sing very well ... is flat a good deal of the time—more last night than at any time we have heard her in past years ... has not improved in the years we have heard her ... [and] still cannot sing with anything approaching professional finish.

Truman wrote a scathing response:

I've just read your lousy review of Margaret's concert. I've come to the conclusion that you are an 'eight ulcer man on four ulcer pay.' It seems to me that you are a frustrated old man who wishes he could have been successful. When you write such poppy-cock as was in the back section of the paper you work for it shows conclusively that you're off the beam and at least four of your ulcers are at work. Some day I hope to meet you. When that happens you'll need a new nose, a lot of beefsteak for black eyes, and perhaps a supporter below! Pegler, a gutter snipe, is a gentleman alongside you. I hope you'll accept that statement as a worse insult than a reflection on your ancestry.

Truman was criticized by many for the letter. However, he pointed out that he wrote it as a loving father and not as the president.

In 1951, William M. Boyle, Truman's longtime friend and chairman of the Democratic National Committee, was forced to resign after being charged with financial corruption.

=== Civil rights ===
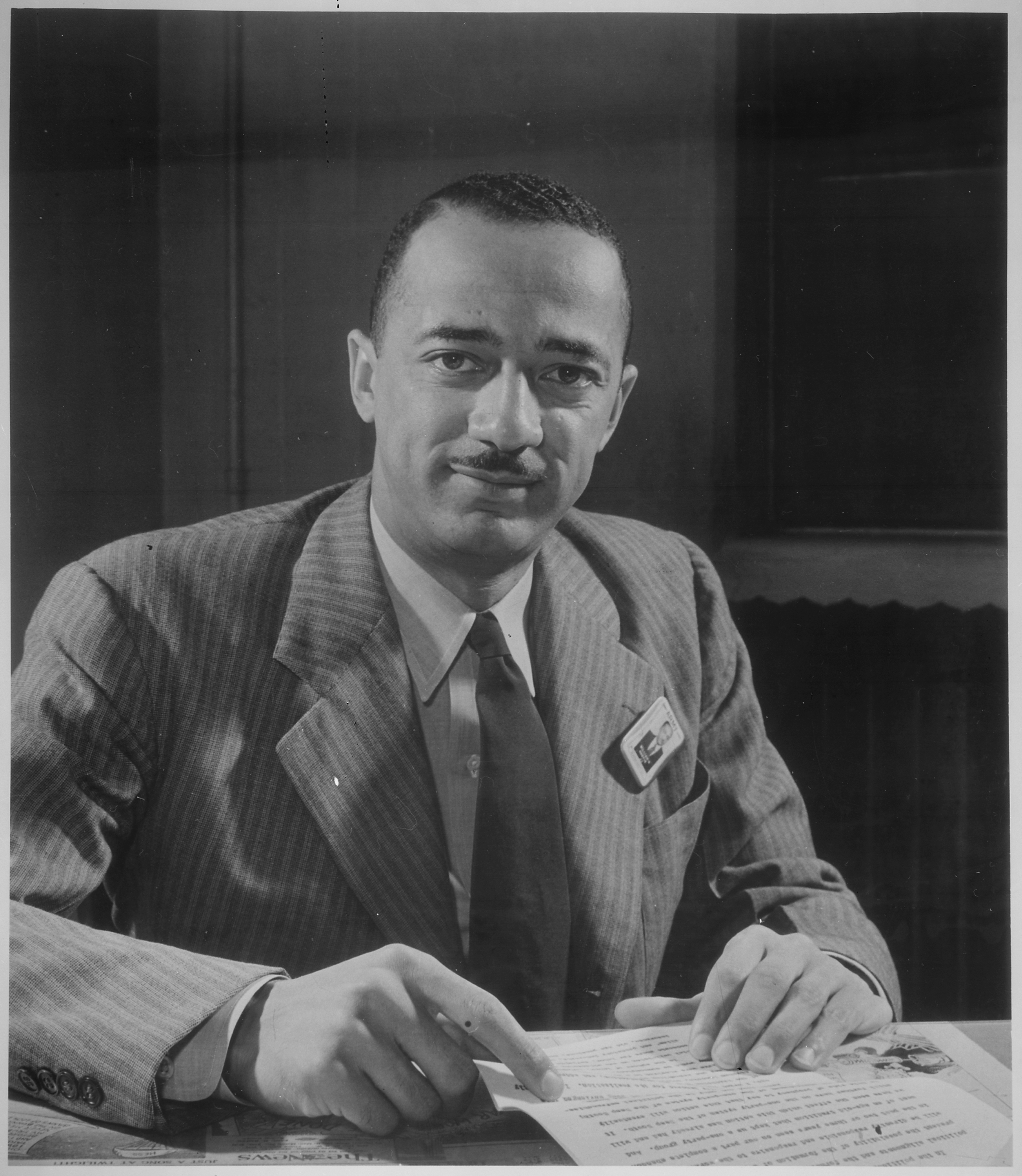
William H. Hastie, the first African-American federal judge, was appointed by Truman on October 21, 1949

A 1947 report by the Truman administration titled To Secure These Rights presented a detailed ten-point agenda of civil rights reforms. Speaking about this report, international developments have to be taken into account, for with the UN Charter being passed in 1945, the question of whether international human rights law could be applicable also on an inner-land basis became crucial in the United States. Though the report acknowledged such a path was not free from controversy in the 1940s United States, it nevertheless raised the possibility for the UN-Charter to be used as a legal tool to combat racial discrimination in the United States.

In February 1948, the president submitted a civil rights agenda to Congress that proposed creating several federal offices devoted to issues such as voting rights and fair employment practices. This provoked a storm of criticism from southern Democrats in the runup to the national nominating convention, but Truman refused to compromise, saying: "My forebears were Confederates ... but my very stomach turned over when I had learned that Negro soldiers, just back from overseas, were being dumped out of Army trucks in Mississippi and beaten."

Tales of the abuse, violence, and persecution suffered by many African American veterans upon their return from World War II infuriated Truman and were major factors in his decision to issue Executive Order 9981, in July 1948, requiring equal opportunity in the armed forces. In the early 1950s after several years of planning, recommendations and revisions between Truman, the Committee on Equality of Treatment and Opportunity and the various branches of the military, the services became racially integrated. Truman later appointed people who aligned with his civil rights agenda. He appointed fellow colonel and civil rights icon Blake R. Van Leer to the board of the United States Naval Academy and UNESCO who had a focus to work against racism through influential statements on race. Truman made a historic move in 1949, when he gave a recess appointment to William H. Hastie for the Court of Appeals, the first African-American federal judge in the United States.

Executive Order 9980, also in 1948, made it illegal to discriminate against persons applying for civil service positions based on race. A third, in 1951, established the Committee on Government Contract Compliance, which ensured defense contractors did not discriminate because of race.

=== Foreign policy ===
From 1947 until 1989, world affairs were dominated by the Cold War, in which the U.S. and its allies faced the Soviet Union and its allies. There was no large-scale fighting but instead several local civil wars as well as the ever-present threat of a catastrophic nuclear war.

Unlike Roosevelt, Truman distrusted Stalin and the Soviet Union, and did not have FDR's faith in the UN to soften major tensions. Nevertheless, he cooperated in terms of dividing control over Germany. Soviet efforts to use its army to control politics in Eastern Europe and Iran angered Washington. The final break came in 1947 when the Labour government in London could no longer afford to help Greece fight communism and asked Washington to assume responsibility for suppressing the Communist uprising there. The result was the Truman Doctrine of 1947–48 which made it national policy to contain Communist expansion.

Truman was supported by the great majority of Democrats, after he forced out the Henry Wallace faction that wanted good terms with Moscow. Truman's policy had the strong support of most Republicans, who led by Senator Arthur Vandenberg overcame the isolationist Republicans led by Senator Robert A. Taft.

In 1948, Truman signed the Marshall Plan, which supplied Western Europe—including Germany—with US$13 billion in reconstruction aid. Stalin vetoed any participation by East European nations. A similar program was operated by the United States to restore the Japanese economy. The U.S. actively sought allies, which it subsidized with military and economic "foreign aid", as well as diplomatic support. The main diplomatic initiative was the establishment of the North Atlantic Treaty Organization (NATO) in 1949, committing the United States to nuclear defense of Western Europe. The result was a peace in Europe, coupled with the fear of Soviet invasion and a reliance on American protection. The United States operated a worldwide network of bases for its Army, Navy and Air Force, with large contingents stationed in Germany, Japan and South Korea. Washington had a weak intelligence community before 1942, and the Soviets had a very effective network of spies. The solution was to create the Central Intelligence Agency (CIA) in 1947. Economic and propaganda warfare against the communist world became part of the American toolbox.

The containment policy was developed by State Department official George Kennan in 1947. Kennan characterized the Soviet Union as an aggressive, anti-Western power that necessitated containment, a characterization which would shape US foreign policy for decades to come. The idea of containment was to match Soviet aggression with force wherever it occurred while not using nuclear weapons. The policy of containment created a bipolar, zero-sum world where the ideological conflicts between the Soviet Union and the United States dominated geopolitics. Due to the antagonism on both sides and each countries' search for security, a tense worldwide contest developed between the two states as the two nations' governments vied for global supremacy militarily, culturally, and politically.

The Cold War was characterized by a lack of global hot wars. Instead there were proxy wars, fought by client states and proxies of the United States and Soviet Union. The most important was Korean War (1950–1953), a stalemate that drained away Truman's base of support. Truman made five international trips during his presidency.

=== 1952 election ===
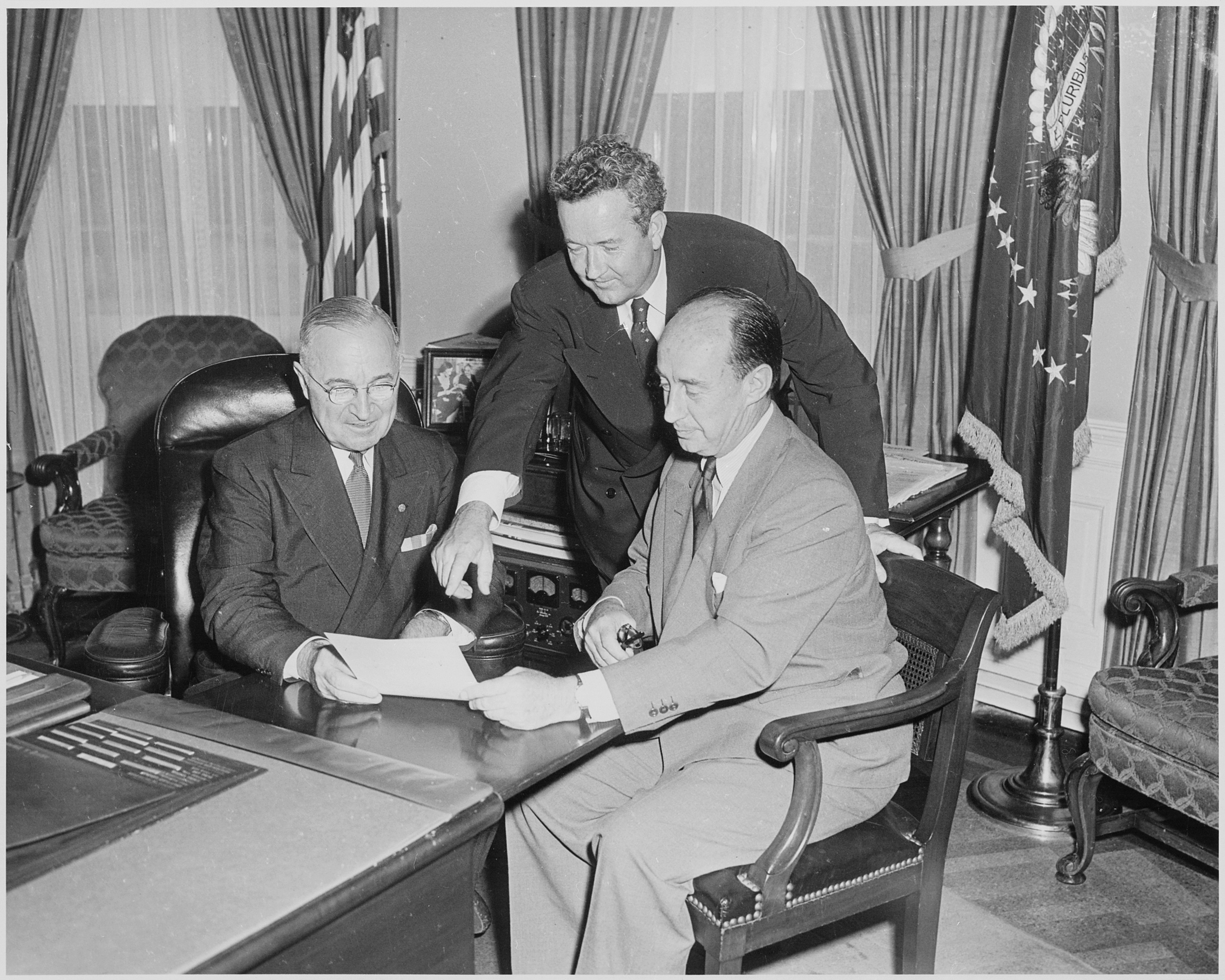
President Truman; Alabama Senator John J. Sparkman, vice presidential nominee; and Illinois Governor Adlai Stevenson, presidential nominee, in the Oval Office, 1952

In 1951, the United States ratified the 22nd Amendment, making a president ineligible for election to a third term or for election to a second full term after serving more than two remaining years of a term of a previously elected president. The latter clause did not apply to Truman's situation in 1952 because of a grandfather clause exempting the incumbent president.

Therefore, he seriously considered running for another term in 1952 and left his name on the ballot in the New Hampshire primary. However, all his close advisors, pointing to his age, his failing abilities, and his poor showing in the polls, talked him out of it. At the time of the 1952 New Hampshire primary (March 11, 1952), no candidate had won Truman's backing. His first choice, Chief Justice Fred M. Vinson, had declined to run. Illinois Governor Adlai Stevenson had also turned Truman down, Vice President Barkley was considered too old, and Truman distrusted and disliked Senator Kefauver, who had made a name for himself by his investigations of the Truman administration scandals.

Truman let his name be entered in the New Hampshire primary by supporters. The highly unpopular Truman was handily defeated by Kefauver; 18 days later the president formally announced he would not seek a second full term. Truman was eventually able to persuade Stevenson to run, and the governor gained the nomination at the 1952 Democratic National Convention.

Harry S. Truman's Farewell Address
Truman's speech on leaving office, and returning home to Independence, Missouri. (January 15, 1953)

Eisenhower gained the Republican nomination, with Senator Nixon as his running mate, and campaigned against what he denounced as Truman's failures: "Korea, communism and corruption". He pledged to clean up the "mess in Washington", and promised to "go to Korea". Eisenhower defeated Stevenson decisively in the general election, ending 20 years of Democratic presidents. While Truman and Eisenhower had previously been on good terms, Truman felt annoyed that Eisenhower did not denounce Joseph McCarthy during the campaign. Similarly, Eisenhower was outraged when Truman accused the former general of disregarding "sinister forces ... Anti-Semitism, anti-Catholicism, and anti-foreignism" within the Republican Party.

== Post-presidency (1953–1972) ==
=== Financial situation ===
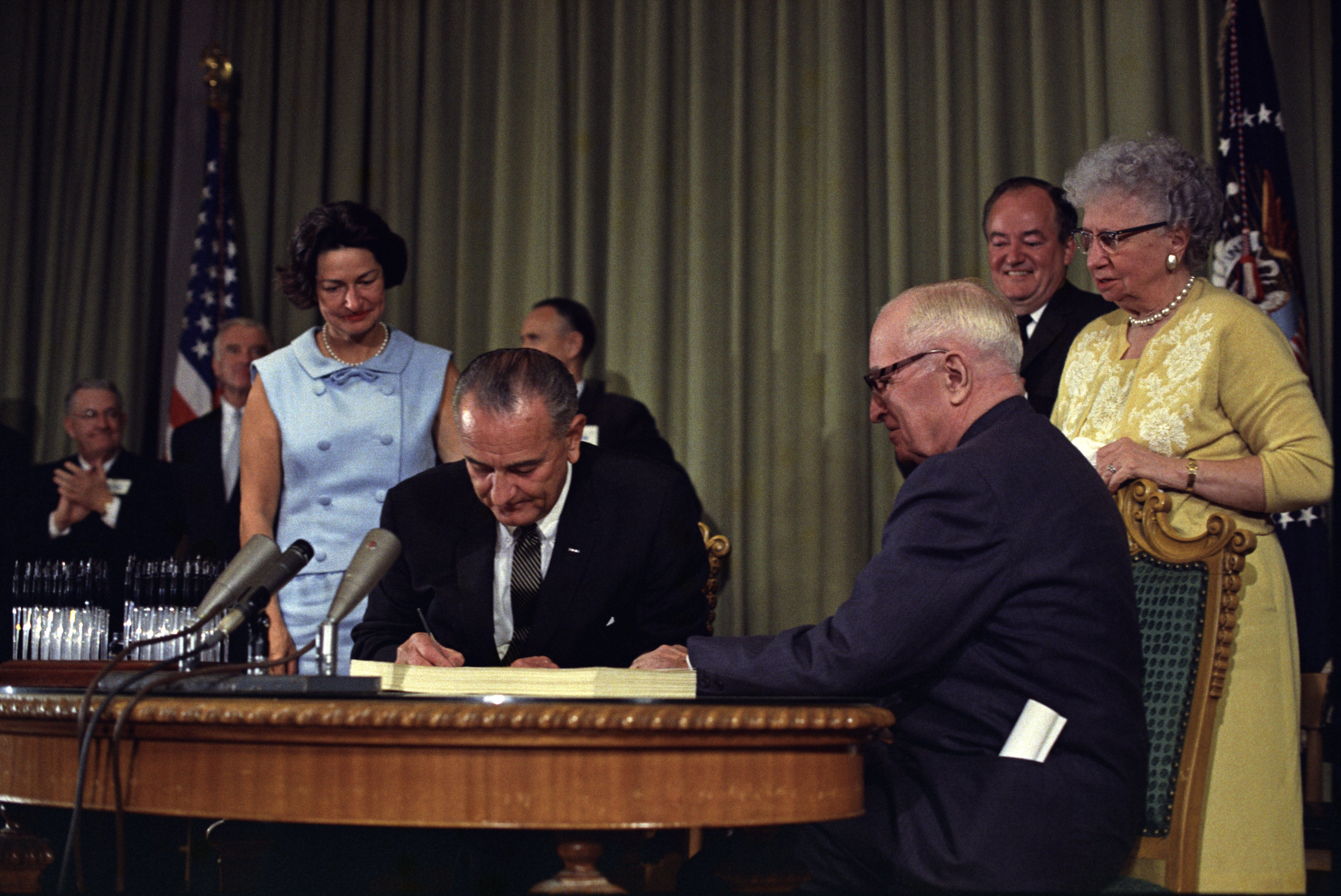
Truman and his wife Bess attend the signing of the Medicare Bill on July 30, 1965, by President Lyndon B. Johnson.

Before being elected as Jackson County judge, Truman had earned little money, and was in debt from the failure of his haberdashery. His election as senator in 1934 carried with it a salary of $10,000 (equivalent to $241,000 in 2025), high for the time, but the need to maintain two homes, with one in expensive Washington, Margaret Truman's college expenses, and contributions to the support of needy relatives, left the Trumans little extra money. He likely had around $7,500 (equivalent to $134,000 in 2025) in cash and government bonds when nominated for vice president.

His finances were transformed by his accession to the presidency, which carried with it a salary of $75,000 (equivalent to $1,341,000 in 2025), which was increased to $100,000 (equivalent to $1,353,000 in 2025) in 1949. This was a higher salary than any Major League Baseball star, except Joe DiMaggio, who also earned $100,000 in his final two seasons (1950 and 1951). Beginning in 1949, the president was also granted a $50,000 (equivalent to $677,000 in 2025) expense allowance, which was initially tax-free, and did not have to be accounted for. Although the allowance became taxable later in his presidency, Truman never reported it on his tax return, and converted some of the funds to cash he kept in the White House safe and later in a safe deposit box in Kansas City.

Upon leaving the presidency, Truman returned to Independence, Missouri, to live at the Wallace home, which he and Bess had shared for years with her mother. In a biography that contributed greatly to the myth that Truman was near penury after departing the White House, David McCullough stated that the Trumans had little alternative than to return to Independence, for his only income was his army pension of $112.56 per month (equivalent to $1,354 in 2025), and he had only been able to save a modest amount from his salary as president. In February 1953, Truman signed a book deal for his memoirs, and in a draft will dated December of that year listed land worth $250,000 (equivalent to $3,008,000 in 2025), savings bonds of the same amount, and cash of $150,000 (equivalent to $1,805,000 in 2025). He wrote, "Bonds, land, and cash all come from savings of presidential salary and free expense account. It should keep you and Margaret comfortably."

The writing of the memoirs was a struggle for Truman, and he went through a dozen collaborators during the project, not all of whom served him well, but he remained heavily involved in the result. For the memoirs, Truman received a payment of $670,000 (equivalent to $8,052,484 in 2025). The memoirs were a commercial and critical success. They were published in two volumes: Memoirs by Harry S. Truman: Year of Decisions (1955) and Memoirs by Harry S. Truman: Years of Trial and Hope (1956).

Former members of Congress and the federal courts received a federal retirement package; President Truman himself ensured that former servants of the executive branch of government received similar support. In 1953, however, there was no such benefit package for former presidents, and Congressional pensions were not approved until 1946, after Truman had left the Senate, so he received no pension for his Senate service. Truman, behind the scenes, lobbied for a pension, writing to congressional leaders that he had been near penury but for the sale of family farmlands. In February 1958, in the first televised interview of a former US president that aired on CBS, Truman claimed that "If I hadn't inherited some property that finally paid things through, I'd be on relief right now." That year, Congress passed the Former Presidents Act, offering a $25,000 (equivalent to $278,979 in 2025) yearly pension to each former president, and it is likely that Truman's claim to be in difficult financial straits played a role in the law's enactment. The only other living former president at the time, Herbert Hoover, also took the pension, even though he did not need the money; reportedly, he did so to avoid embarrassing Truman.

Truman's net worth improved further in 1958 when he and his siblings sold most of the family farm to a Kansas City real estate developer. When he was serving as a county judge, Truman borrowed $31,000 (equivalent to $373,041 in 2025) by mortgaging the farm to the county school fund, which was legal at the time. When Republicans controlled the court in 1940, they foreclosed in an effort to embarrass Truman politically, and his mother and sister Mary Jane had to vacate the home. In 1945, Truman organized a syndicate of supporters who purchased the farm with the understanding that they would sell it back to the Trumans. Harry and Vivian Truman purchased 87 acres in 1945, and Truman purchased another portion in 1946. In January 1959, Truman calculated his net worth as $1,046,788.86 (equivalent to $11,561,000 in 2025), including a share in the Los Angeles Rams football team. Nevertheless, the Trumans always lived modestly in Independence, and when Bess Truman died in 1982, almost a decade after her husband, the house was found to be in poor condition due to deferred maintenance.

Bess Truman's personal papers were made public in 2009, including financial records and tax returns. The myth that Truman had been in straitened circumstances after his presidency was slow to dissipate; Paul Campos wrote in 2021, "The current, 20,000-plus-word Wikipedia biography of Truman goes so far as to assert that, because his earlier business ventures had failed, Truman left the White House with 'no personal savings.' Every aspect of this narrative is false." (Note: That claim was removed from this article on August 1, 2021, with this edit.)

=== Truman Library and academic positions ===
Truman's predecessor, Franklin D. Roosevelt, had organized his own presidential library, but legislation to enable future presidents to do something similar had not been enacted. Truman worked to garner private donations to build a presidential library, which he donated to the federal government to maintain and operate—a practice adopted by his successors.

He testified before Congress to have money appropriated to have presidential papers copied and organized. He was proud of the bill's passage in 1957. Max Skidmore, in his book on the life of former presidents, wrote that Truman was a well-read man, especially in history. Skidmore added that the presidential papers legislation and the founding of his library "was the culmination of his interest in history. Together they constitute an enormous contribution to the United States—one of the greatest of any former president."

Truman taught occasional courses at universities, including Yale, where he was a Chubb Fellow visiting lecturer in 1958. In 1962, Truman was a visiting lecturer at Canisius College.

=== Politics ===
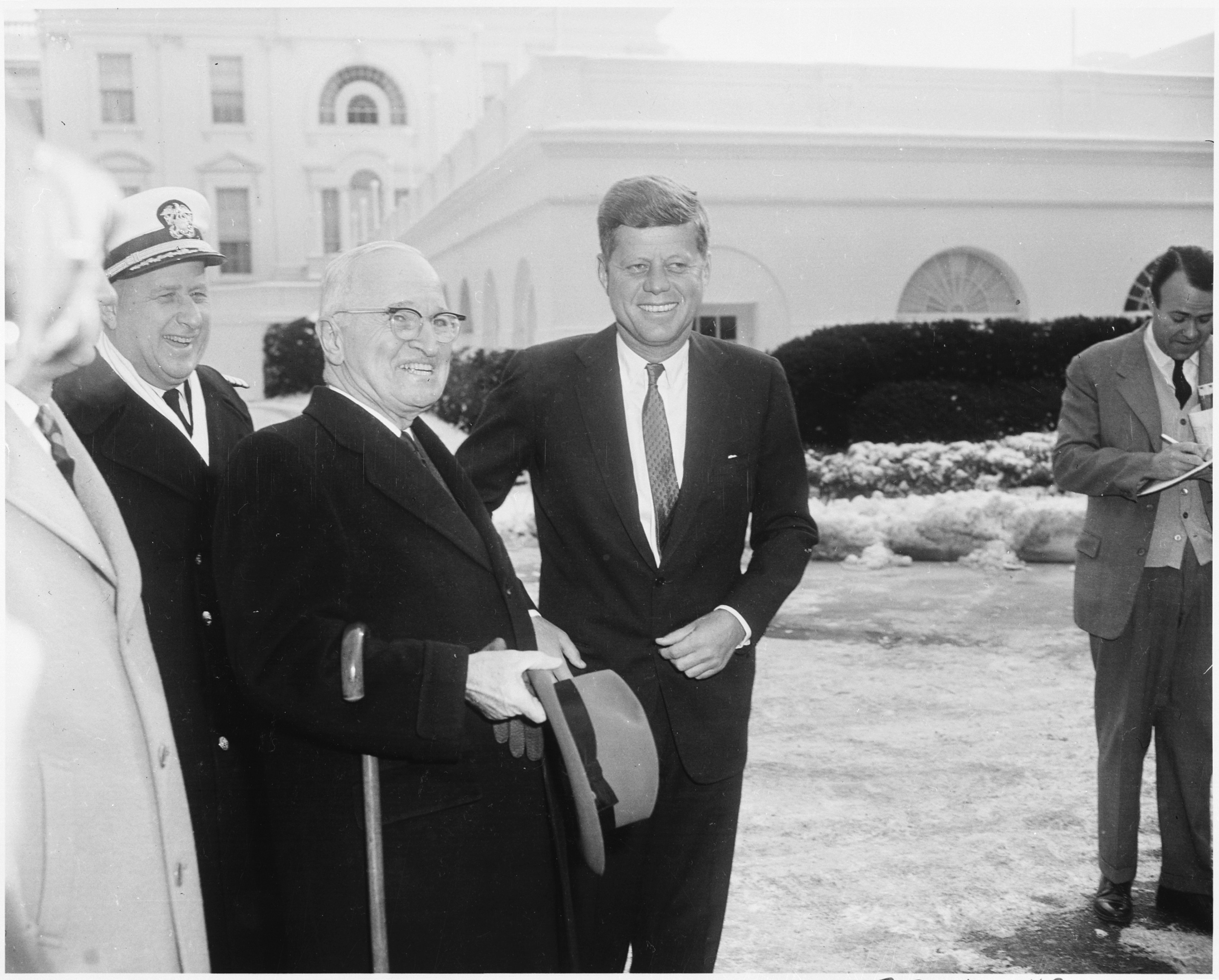
Former President Truman is greeted by President John F. Kennedy at the White House on January 21, 1961

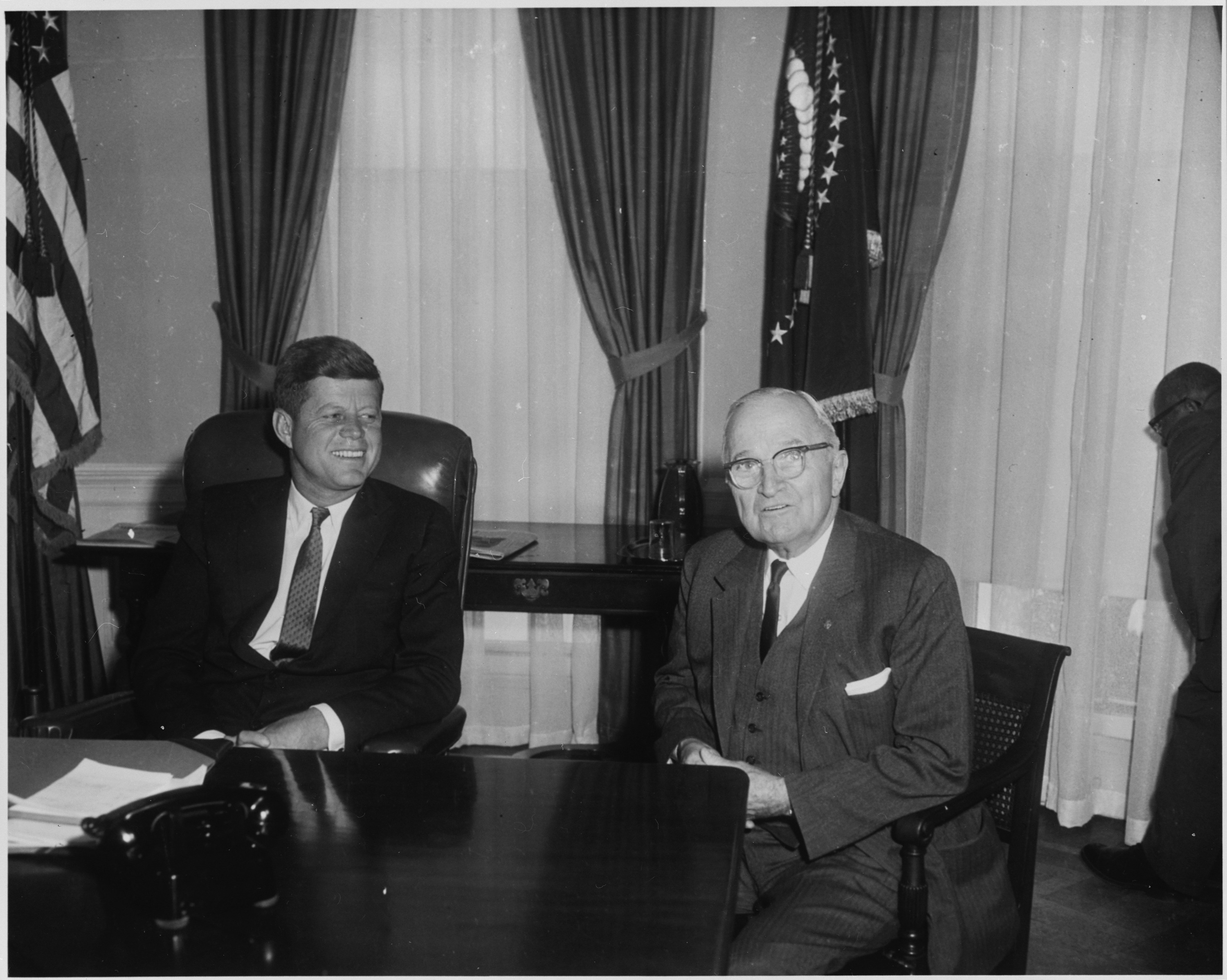
Former President Truman sits with President John F. Kennedy in the Oval Office at the White House.

Truman supported Adlai Stevenson's second bid for the White House in 1956, although he had initially favored Democratic governor W. Averell Harriman of New York. He continued to campaign for Democratic senatorial candidates for many years.

In 1960 Truman gave a public statement announcing he would not attend the Democratic Convention that year, citing concerns about the way that the supporters of John F. Kennedy had gained control of the nominating process, and called on Kennedy to forgo the nomination for that year. Kennedy responded with a press conference where he bluntly rebuffed Truman's advice.

Despite his supportive stance on civil rights during his presidency, Truman expressed criticism of the civil rights movement during the 1960s. In 1960, he stated that he believed the sit-in movement to be part of a Soviet plot. Truman's statement garnered a response from Martin Luther King Jr., who wrote a letter to the former president stating that he was "baffled" by the accusation, and demanded a public apology. Truman would later criticize King following the Selma march in 1965, believing the protest to be "silly" and claiming that it "can't accomplish a darn thing except to attract attention." In 1963, Truman voiced his opposition to interracial marriage, believing that daughters of white people would never love someone of an opposite color.

On December 22, 1963, Truman published an article in The Washington Post entitled 'Limit CIA Role to Intelligence' where he said that "for some time I have been disturbed by the way CIA has been diverted from its original assignment. It has become an operational and at times a policy-making arm of the Government" and that he "never had any thought that when I set up the CIA that it would be injected into peacetime cloak and dagger operations". He concluded that "there is something about the way the CIA has been functioning that is casting a shadow over our historic position and I feel that we need to correct it".

Upon turning 80 in 1964, Truman was feted in Washington, and addressed the Senate, availing himself of a new rule that allowed former presidents to be granted privilege of the floor.

=== Medicare ===
After a fall in his home in late 1964, Truman's physical condition declined. In 1965, President Lyndon B. Johnson signed the Medicare bill at the Harry S. Truman Presidential Library and Museum and gave the first two Medicare cards to Truman and his wife Bess to honor the former president's fight for government health care while in office.

== Death ==
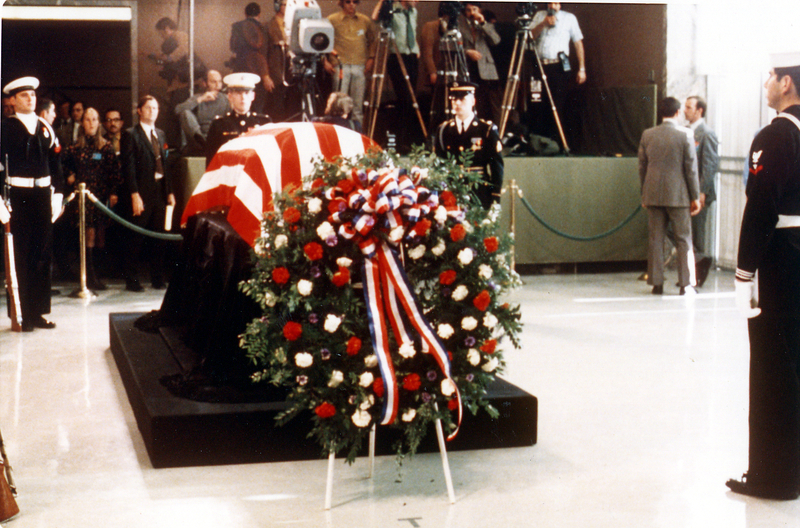
Wreath by Truman's casket, December 27, 1972

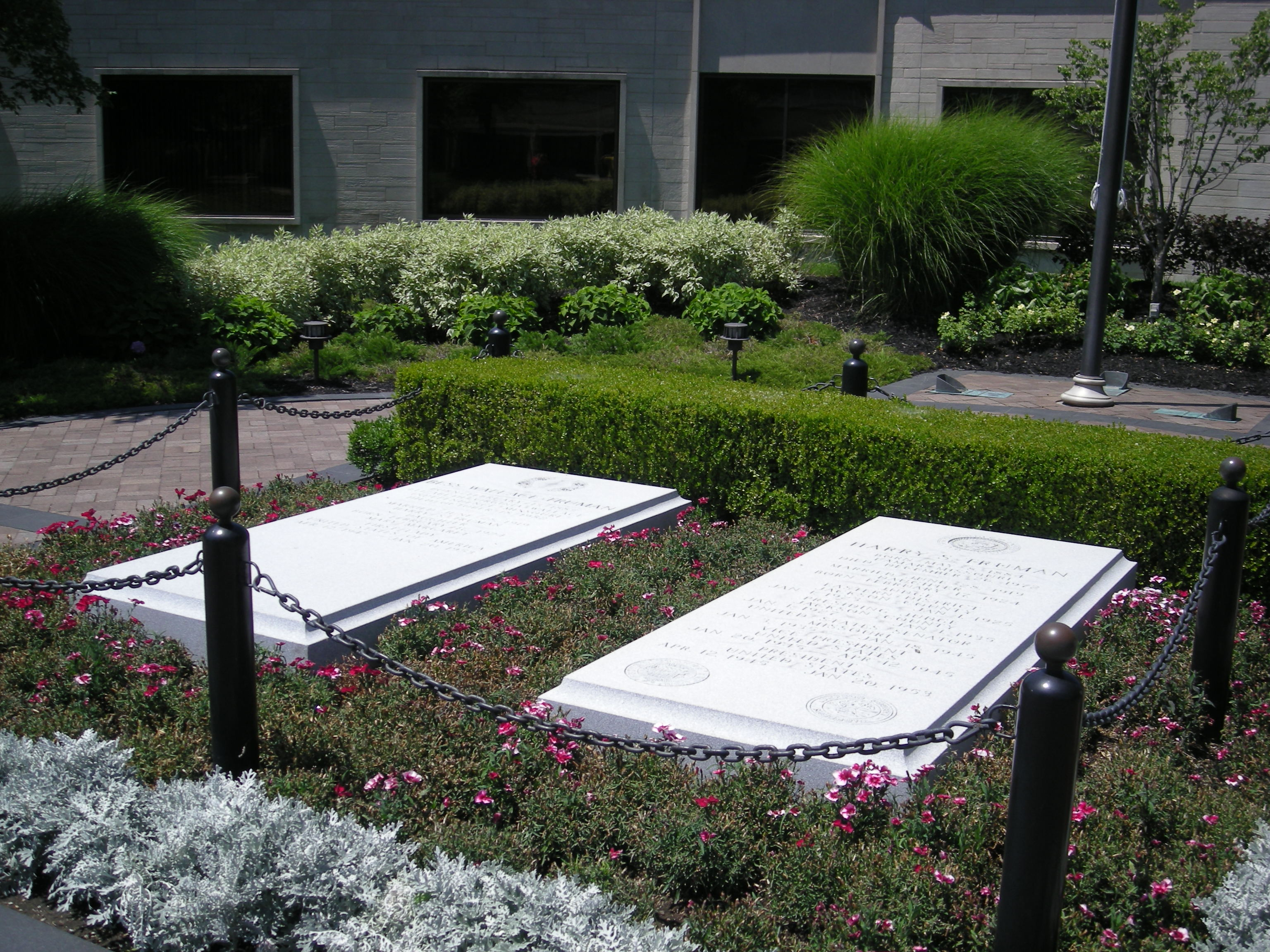
Graves of Harry S. Truman and Bess Truman in Independence, Missouri

On December 5, 1972, Truman was admitted to Kansas City's Research Hospital and Medical Center with pneumonia. He developed multiple organ failure, fell into a coma, and died at 7:50 a.m. on December 26, at the age of 88. At the time of his death, Truman had been the oldest living president, a distinction he held from the time of Hoover's death in 1964.

Bess Truman opted for a simple private service at the library rather than a state funeral in Washington. A week after the funeral, foreign dignitaries and Washington officials attended a memorial service at Washington National Cathedral.

Bess Truman died in 1982 and was buried next to her husband at the Harry S. Truman Library and Museum in Independence, Missouri.

== Tributes and legacy ==
=== Legacy ===
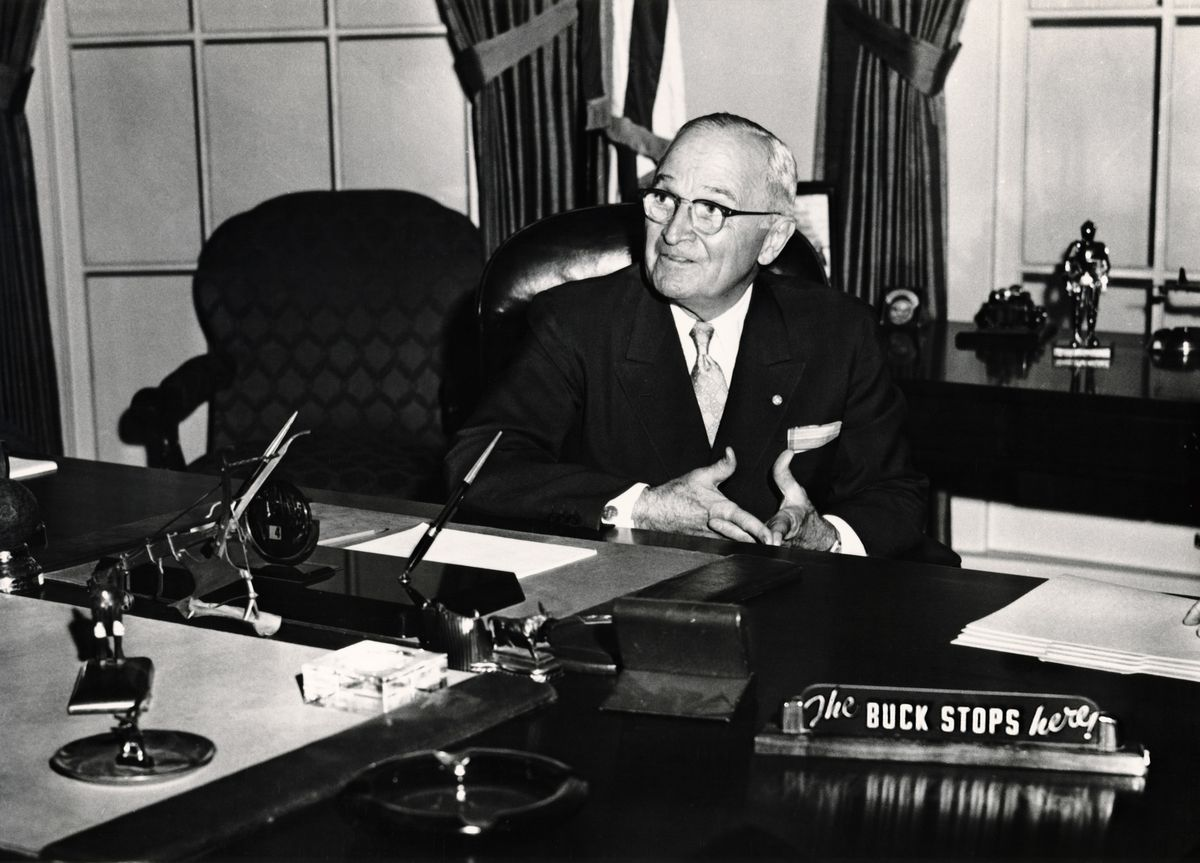
Former President Harry Truman with "The Buck Stops Here" sign on a recreation of his Oval Office desk

When he left office in 1953, Truman was one of the most unpopular chief executives in history. His job approval rating of 22% in the Gallup Poll of February 1952 was lower than Richard Nixon's 24% in August 1974, the month that Nixon resigned. American public feeling towards Truman grew steadily warmer with the passing years; as early as 1962, a poll of 75 historians conducted by Arthur M. Schlesinger, Sr. ranked Truman among the "near great" presidents. The period following his death consolidated a partial rehabilitation of his legacy among both historians and members of the public. Truman died when the nation was consumed with crises in Vietnam and Watergate, and his death brought a new wave of attention to his political career. In the early and mid-1970s, Truman captured the popular imagination much as he had in 1948, this time emerging as a kind of political folk hero, a president who was thought to exemplify an integrity and accountability many observers felt was lacking in the Nixon White House. This public reassessment of Truman was aided by the popularity of a book of reminiscences which Truman had told to journalist Merle Miller beginning in 1961, with the agreement that they would not be published until after Truman's death.

Truman had his latter-day critics as well. After a review of information available to Truman about the presence of espionage activities in the U.S. government, Democratic Senator Daniel Patrick Moynihan concluded that Truman was "almost willfully obtuse" concerning the danger of American communism. In 2010, historian Alonzo Hamby concluded that "Harry Truman remains a controversial president." However, Truman has fared well in polls ranking the presidents, consistently being listed in the top ten; this includes a 2022 poll by the Siena College Research Institute, which placed him in seventh.

The fall of the Soviet Union in 1991 caused Truman advocates to claim vindication for Truman's decisions in the postwar period. According to Truman biographer Robert Dallek, "His contribution to victory in the cold war without a devastating nuclear conflict elevated him to the stature of a great or near-great president." The 1992 publication of David McCullough's favorable biography of Truman further cemented the view of Truman as a highly regarded chief executive. According to historian Daniel R. McCoy in his book on the Truman presidency:

Harry Truman himself gave a strong and far-from-incorrect impression of being a tough, concerned and direct leader. He was occasionally vulgar, often partisan, and usually nationalistic ... On his own terms, Truman can be seen as having prevented the coming of a third world war and having preserved from Communist oppression much of what he called the free world. Yet clearly he largely failed to achieve his Wilsonian aim of securing perpetual peace, making the world safe for democracy, and advancing opportunities for individual development internationally.

=== Sites and honors ===
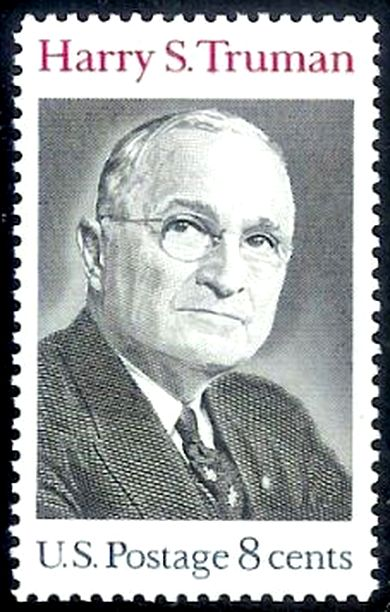
Stamp issued in 1973, following Truman's death—Truman has been honored on five U.S. postage stamps, issued from 1973 to 1999.

In 1956, Truman traveled to Europe with his wife. In Britain, he received an honorary degree in Civil Law from Oxford University and met with Winston Churchill. In 1959, he was given a 50-year award by the Masons, recognizing his longstanding involvement: he was initiated on February 9, 1909, into the Belton Freemasonry Lodge in Missouri. In 1911, he helped establish the Grandview Lodge, and he served as its first Worshipful Master. In September 1940, during his Senate re-election campaign, Truman was elected Grand Master of the Grand Lodge of Missouri; Truman said later that the Masonic election assured his victory in the general election. In 1945, he was made a 33° Sovereign Grand Inspector General and an Honorary Member of the supreme council at the Supreme Council A.A.S.R. Southern Jurisdiction Headquarters in Washington D.C. Truman was also a member of Sons of the American Revolution (SAR) and a card-carrying member of the Sons of Confederate Veterans. Two of his relatives were Confederate soldiers.

In 1975, the Truman Scholarship was created as a federal program to honor U.S. college students who exemplified dedication to public service and leadership in public policy.

In 1983 the Harry S. Truman State Office Building in Jefferson City was completed.

In 2004, the President Harry S. Truman Fellowship in National Security Science and Engineering was created as a distinguished postdoctoral three-year appointment at Sandia National Laboratories. In 2001, the University of Missouri established the Harry S. Truman School of Public Affairs to advance the study and practice of governance. The University of Missouri's Missouri Tigers athletic programs have an official mascot named Truman the Tiger. On July 1, 1996, Northeast Missouri State University became Truman State University—to mark its transformation from a teachers' college to a highly selective liberal arts university and to honor the only Missourian to become president. A member institution of the City Colleges of Chicago, Harry S. Truman College in Chicago, Illinois, is named in his honor for his dedication to public colleges and universities. In 2000, the headquarters for the State Department, built in the 1930s but never officially named, was dedicated as the Harry S. Truman Building.

Despite Truman's attempt to curtail the naval carrier arm, which led to the 1949 Revolt of the Admirals, an aircraft carrier is named after him. The USS Harry S. Truman (CVN-75) was christened on September 7, 1996. The 129th Field Artillery Regiment is designated "Truman's Own" in recognition of Truman's service as commander of its D Battery during World War I.

In 1991, Truman was inducted into the Hall of Famous Missourians, and a bronze bust depicting him is on permanent display in the rotunda of the Missouri State Capitol. In 2006, Thomas Daniel, grandson of the Trumans, accepted a star on the Missouri Walk of Fame to honor his late grandfather. In 2007, John Truman, a nephew, accepted a star for Bess Truman. The Walk of Fame is in Marshfield, Missouri, a city Truman visited in 1948.

In 2004, international relations scholars Rachel Kleinfeld and Matthew Spence founded the Truman National Security Project. In 2013, they launched the Truman Center for National Policy. Both organizations were named after Truman.

A statue of Harry S. Truman was installed in the U.S. Capitol, in Washington, D.C., on September 29, 2022, as part of the National Statuary Hall Collection.

On the 70th anniversary of the Korean War armistice in 2023, South Korea erected a statue of Truman in Dabu-dong, Gyeongsangbuk-do to commemorate him sending US troops to defend the country.

Other sites associated with Truman include:

- Harry S. Truman National Historic Site includes the Wallace House at 219 N. Delaware in Independence and the family farmhouse at Grandview, Missouri (Truman sold most of the farm for Kansas City suburban development including the Truman Corners Shopping Center).
- Harry S Truman Birthplace State Historic Site is the house where Truman was born and spent 11 months in Lamar, Missouri.
- Harry S. Truman Presidential Library and Museum – The Presidential library in Independence.
- Harry S. Truman Little White House – Truman's winter getaway at Key West, Florida.

== See also ==
- Electoral history of Harry S. Truman
- "Harry Truman", a song by the band Chicago, 1975
- List of members of the American Legion
- List of presidents of the United States
- List of presidents of the United States by previous experience
- Truman, 1995 film
- Truman Day, Missouri state holiday

== Bibliography ==
=== Biographies of Truman ===
- Burnes, Brian (2003). Harry S. Truman: His Life and Times. Kansas City, MO: Kansas City Star Books. ISBN 978-0-9740009-3-0.
- Dallek, Robert (2008). Harry S. Truman. New York: Times Books. ISBN 978-0-8050-6938-9.
- Daniels, Jonathan (1998). The Man of Independence. University of Missouri Press. ISBN 0-8262-1190-9.
- Donovan, Robert J. (1983). Tumultuous Years: 1949–1953. New York: W. W. Norton. ISBN 978-0-393-01619-2.
- Ferrell, Robert H. (1994). Harry S. Truman: A Life. Columbia, MO: University of Missouri Press. ISBN 978-0-8262-1050-0.
- Hamby, Alonzo L., ed. (1974). Harry S. Truman and the Fair Deal. Lexington, MA: D. C. Heath & Co. ISBN 978-0-669-87080-0.
- Hamby, Alonzo L. (1995). Man of the People: A Life of Harry S. Truman. Oxford: Oxford University Press. ISBN 978-0-19-504546-8.
- Judis, John B. (2014). Genesis: Truman, American Jews, and the Origins of the Arab/Israeli Conflict. New York: Farrar, Straus & Giroux. ISBN 978-0-374-16109-5.
- Freeland, Richard M. (1970). The Truman Doctrine and the Origins of McCarthyism. New York: Alfred A. Knopf. ISBN 978-0-8147-2576-4.
- Giglio, James N. (2001). Truman in Cartoon and Caricature. Kirksville, Missouri: Truman State University Press. ISBN 978-0-8138-1806-1.
- Kirkendall, Richard S. (1989). Harry S. Truman Encyclopedia. Boston: G. K. Hall Publishing. ISBN 978-0-8161-8915-1.
- McCoy, Donald R. (1984). The Presidency of Harry S. Truman. Lawrence, KS: University Press of Kansas. ISBN 978-0-7006-0252-0.
- McCullough, David (1992). Truman. New York: Simon & Schuster. ISBN 978-0-671-86920-5.
- Margolies, Daniel S. ed. A Companion to Harry S. Truman (2012); 614pp; emphasis on historiography; see Sean J. Savage, "Truman in Historical, Popular, and Political Memory," pp. 9–25. excerpt
- Miller, Merle (1974). Plain Speaking: An Oral Biography of Harry S. Truman. New York: Putnam Publishing. ISBN 978-0-399-11261-4.
- Mitchell, Franklin D. (1998). Harry S. Truman and the News Media: Contentious Relations, Belated Respect. Columbia, MO: University of Missouri Press. ISBN 0-8262-1180-1.
- Oshinsky, David M. (2004). "Harry Truman". In Brinkley, Alan; Dyer, Davis (eds.). The American Presidency. Boston: Houghton Mifflin. ISBN 978-0-618-38273-6.
- Pietrusza, David (2011). 1948: Harry Truman's Improbable Victory and the Year That Transformed America. New York: Union Square Press. ISBN 978-1-4027-6748-7.
- Scarborough, Joe (2020). Saving Freedom. New York: Harper Collins.

=== Books ===
- Ambrose, Stephen E. (1983). Eisenhower: 1890–1952. New York: Simon & Schuster. ISBN 978-0-671-44069-5.
- Binning, William C.; Esterly, Larry E.; Sracic, Paul A. (1999). Encyclopedia of American Parties, Campaigns, and Elections. Westport, CT: Greenwood. ISBN 978-0-8131-1755-3.
- Chambers II, John W. (1999). The Oxford Companion to American Military History. Oxford: Oxford University Press. ISBN 0-19-507198-0.
- Cohen, Eliot A.; Gooch, John (2006). Military Misfortunes: The Anatomy of Failure in War. New York: Free Press. ISBN 978-0-7432-8082-2.
- Current, Richard Nelson; Freidel, Frank Burt; Williams, Thomas Harry (1971). American History: A Survey. Vol. II. New York: Knopf.
- Eakin, Joanne C.; Hale, Donald R., eds. (1995). Branded as Rebels. Madison, WI: University of Wisconsin Press. ASIN B003GWL8J6.
- Eisler, Kim Isaac (1993). A Justice for All: William J. Brennan, Jr., and the Decisions that Transformed America. New York: Simon & Schuster. ISBN 978-0-671-76787-7.
- Evans, M. Stanton (2007). Blacklisted by History: The Untold Story of Senator Joe McCarthy and His Fight Against America's Enemies. New York: Crown Publishing Group. ISBN 978-0-307-23866-5.
- Goodwin, Doris Kearns (1994). No Ordinary Time: Franklin and Eleanor Roosevelt: The Home Front in World War II. New York: Simon & Schuster. ISBN 978-0-671-64240-2.
- Haas, Lawrence J. Harry & Arthur: Truman, Vandenberg, and the Partnership That Created the Free World (2016)
- Hamilton, Lee H. (2009). "Relations between the President and Congress in Wartime". In James A. Thurber (ed.). Rivals for Power: Presidential–Congressional Relations. Rowman & Littlefield. ISBN 978-0-7425-6142-7.
- Holsti, Ole (1996). Public Opinion and American Foreign Policy. Ann Arbor, MI: The University of Michigan Press. ISBN 978-0-472-06619-3.
- Kloetzel, James E.; Charles, Steve, eds. (April 2012). Scott Standard Postage Stamp Catalog. Vol. 1. Sidney, OH: Scott Publishing Co. ISBN 978-0-89487-460-4.
- Lenczowski, George (1990). American Presidents and the Middle East. Durham, NC: Duke University Press. ISBN 978-0-8223-0972-7.
- MacGregor, Morris J. Jr. (1981). Integration of the Armed Services 1940–1965. Washington, D.C.: Center of Military History. ISBN 978-0-16-001925-8.
- Savage, Sean J. (1991). Roosevelt: The Party Leader, 1932–1945. Lexington, KY: The University Press of Kentucky. ISBN 978-0-8131-1755-3.
- Skidmore, Max J. (2004). After the White House: Former Presidents as Private Citizens (rev ed.). New York: Macmillan. ISBN 978-0-312-29559-2.
- Stohl, Michael (1988). "National Interest and State Terrorism". The Politics of Terrorism. New York: CRC Press.
- Stokesbury, James L. (1990). A Short History of the Korean War. New York: Harper Perennial. ISBN 978-0-688-09513-0.
- Troy, Gil (2008). Leading from the Center: Why Moderates Make the Best Presidents. New York: Basic Books. ISBN 978-0-465-00293-1.
- Weinstein, Allen (1997). Perjury: The Hiss-Chambers Case (revised ed.). New York: Random House. ISBN 0-679-77338-X.
- Young, Ken; Schilling, Warner R. (2019). Super Bomb: Organizational Conflict and the Development of the Hydrogen Bomb. Ithaca, New York: Cornell University Press. ISBN 978-1-5017-4516-4.

=== Primary sources ===
- Truman, Harry S. (1955). Memoirs: Year of Decisions. Vol. 1. Garden City, NY: Doubleday. online
- ——— (1956). Memoirs: Years of Trial and Hope. Vol. 2. Garden City, NY: Doubleday. online v 2
- ——— (1960). Mr. Citizen. Independence, MO: Independence Press.
- Truman, Harry S. (2002). Ferrell, Robert H. (ed.). The Autobiography of Harry S. Truman. Columbia, Missouri: University of Missouri Press. ISBN 0-8262-1445-2.
- Truman, Margaret (1973). Harry S. Truman. New York: William Morrow. ISBN 978-0-688-00005-9.
- Martin, Joseph William (1960). My First Fifty Years in Politics as Told to Robert J. Donovan. New York: McGraw-Hill.

=== Journals ===
- Griffith, Robert, ed. (Autumn 1975). "Truman and the Historians: The Reconstruction of Postwar American history". The Wisconsin Magazine of History. 59 (1).
- Hamby, Alonzo L (August 2008). "1948 Democratic Convention The South Secedes Again". Smithsonian.
- Hechler, Ken; Elsey, George M. (2006). "The Greatest Upset in American Political History: Harry Truman and the 1948 Election". White House Studies (Winter).
- Heaster, Brenda L. "Who's on Second: The 1944 Democratic Vice Presidential Nomination." Missouri Historical Review 80.2 (1986): 156–175.
- Matray, James I. (September 1, 1979). "Truman's Plan for Victory: National Self-determination and the Thirty-eighth Parallel Decision in Korea". Journal of American History. 66 (2): 314–333. doi:10.2307/1900879. ISSN 0021-8723. JSTOR 1900879.
- May, Ernest R. (2002). "1947–48: When Marshall Kept the U.S. Out of War in China" (PDF). The Journal of Military History. 66 (October 2002): 1001–1010. doi:10.2307/3093261. JSTOR 3093261. S2CID 163803120. Archived from the original (PDF) on February 27, 2020.
- Neustadt, Richard E. (1954). "Congress and the Fair Deal: A Legislative Balance Sheet". Public Policy. 5. Boston. reprinted in Hamby 1974, pp. 15–42
- Ottolenghi, Michael (December 2004). "Harry Truman's Recognition of Israel". Historical Journal. 47 (4): 963–988. doi:10.1017/S0018246X04004066. S2CID 159849275.
- Smaltz, Donald C. (July 1998). "Independent Counsel: A View from Inside". The Georgetown Law Journal. 86 (6).
- Strout, Lawrence N. (1999). "Covering McCarthyism: How the Christian Science Monitor Handled Joseph R. McCarthy, 1950–1954". Journal of Political and Military Sociology. 2001 (Summer).
- Wells, Samuel F. Jr. (Autumn 1979). "Sounding the Tocsin: NSC 68 and the Soviet Threat". International Security. 4 (2): 116–158. doi:10.2307/2626746. JSTOR 2626746. S2CID 155072379.
- "Truman Committee Exposes Housing Mess". Life. November 30, 1942. pp. 45–46, 48, 50, 52.

==== Time ====
- Gibbs, Nancy (November 10, 2008). "When New President Meets Old, It's Not Always Pretty". Time. Archived from the original on November 11, 2008.
- "Armed Forces: Revolt of the Admirals". Time. October 17, 1949. Archived from the original on July 13, 2007.
- "The Art of the Possible". Time. June 6, 1949. Archived from the original on September 30, 2007.
- "Historical Notes: Giving Them More Hell". Time. December 3, 1973. Archived from the original on October 12, 2007.
- "The Man of Spirit". Time. August 13, 1956. Archived from the original on October 12, 2007.
- "National Affairs: Taft–Hartley: How It Works and How It Has Worked". Time. October 19, 1959. Archived from the original on October 12, 2007.
- "The Presidency: The World of Harry Truman". Time. January 8, 1973. Archived from the original on May 10, 2008.
- "Truman on Time Magazine Covers". Time. 2012.
- "The Wonderful Wastebasket". Time. March 24, 1952. p. 3. Archived from the original on October 12, 2007.

==== The Washington Post ====
- Barnes, Bart (January 29, 2008). "Margaret Truman Daniel Dies at Age 83". The Washington Post.
- Barr, Cameron W. (December 11, 2004). "Listing Madonna Rescued in Bethesda". The Washington Post.
- Smith, J. Y. (November 28, 2001). "Paul Hume: Music Critic Who Panned Truman Daughter's Singing and Drew Presidential Wrath". The Washington Post.

==== The New York Times ====
- Nevins, Allan (November 6, 1955). "Year of Decisions a 'volume of distinction'". The New York Times Book Review.
- Weintraub, Stanley (2000). "MacArthur's War Korea and the Undoing of an American Hero". The New York Times.

=== Harry S. Truman Library and Museum ===
- McCray, Suzanne, and Tara Yglesias, eds. Wild about Harry: Everything You Have Ever Wanted to Know about the Truman Scholarship (University of Arkansas Press, 2021), how to work at this Library. online
- Giangreco, D. M.; Griffin, Robert E (1988). "The Airlift Begins: Airbridge to Berlin – The Berlin Crisis of 1948, its Origins and Aftermath". Harry S. Truman Library & Museum. Archived from the original on May 6, 2016.
- Marks, Ted (1962). "Oral History Interview with Ted Marks". Harry S. Truman Library & Museum.
- Southern, Mrs. William (June 28, 1919). "Wedding of Bess Wallace and Capt. Harry S. Truman". The Examiner. Harry S. Truman Library & Museum.
- Strout, Richard L. (February 5, 1971). "Oral History Interview with Richard L. Strout". Harry S. Truman Library & Museum.
- Truman, Harry (May 14, 1948). "Memo recognizing the state of Israel". Harry S. Truman Library & Museum. Archived from the original on May 9, 2020.
- Truman, Harry (November 11, 1918). "WWI Letter from Harry to Bess". Harry S. Truman Library & Museum. Archived from the original on October 12, 2017.
- Vest, Kathleen. "Truman's First Democratic Convention". Harry S. Truman Library & Museum.
- "Background Information". The Truman Balcony. Harry S. Truman Library & Museum. Archived from the original on October 12, 2017.
- "Background Information (Continued)". The Truman Balcony. Harry S. Truman Library & Museum. Archived from the original on November 5, 2018.
- "Biographical sketch of Mrs. Harry S. Truman". Harry S. Truman Library & Museum. Archived from the original on November 7, 2018.
- "Birthplace of Harry S. Truman". Harry S. Truman Library & Museum. 1988. Archived from the original on May 3, 2019.
- "'The Buck Stops Here' Desk sign". Harry S. Truman Library & Museum.
- "Chronological Record of the 129th Field Artillery 1917–1919". Harry S. Truman Library & Museum. Archived from the original on May 3, 2019.
- "Desegregation of the Armed Forces". Harry S. Truman Library & Museum. Archived from the original on April 5, 2019.
- "Drugstore Clerk at 14 His First Job". Harry S. Truman Library & Museum.
- "Eleanor and Harry: The Correspondence of Eleanor Roosevelt and Harry S. Truman". Harry S. Truman Library & Museum. Archived from the original on October 8, 2018.
- "FAQ: Is the letter on display that Truman wrote in defense of his daughter's singing?". Harry S. Truman Library & Museum. December 6, 1950.
- "Harry S. Truman Post-Presidential Papers". Harry S. Truman Library & Museum.
- "Harry Truman joins Battery B of the Missouri National Guard". Harry S. Truman Library & Museum. Archived from the original on November 5, 2018.
- "Memorandum of Information for the Secretary – Blockade of Korea". Harry S. Truman Library & Museum. July 6, 1950. Archived from the original on August 9, 2007.
- "Military Personnel File of Harry S. Truman". Harry S. Truman Library & Museum.
- "President Lyndon B. Johnson Signs Medicare Bill". Harry S. Truman Library & Museum. July 30, 1965. Archived from the original on May 27, 2019.
- "President Truman Addresses Congress on Proposed Health Program, Washington, D.C." This Day in Truman History. Harry S. Truman Library & Museum. November 19, 1945. Archived from the original on June 14, 2019.
- McDonald, John W. (May 1984). "10 of Truman's Happiest Years Spent in Senate". Harry S. Truman Library & Museum. Originally published in the Independence Examiner, Truman Centennial Edition.
- "Special Message to the Congress on Civil Rights". Harry S. Truman Library & Museum. Archived from the original on May 9, 2020.
- "Use of the Period After the "S" in Harry S. Truman's Name". Harry S. Truman Library & Museum.

=== Online sources ===
- Roberts, Christopher N.J. (1949). "William H. Fitzpatrick's Editorials on Human Rights". Quellen zur Geschichte der Menschenrechte., published by Arbeitskreis Menschenrechte im 20. Jahrhundert
- "Special Designation Liting". Army National Guard, United States Army. Archived from the original on December 12, 2018.
- ""Mike" Device is Tested". Atomic Archive.
- Bennett, Stephen Earl (May 2012). "Restoration of Confidence: Polling's Comeback from 1948". Public Opinion Pros. Archived from the original on March 5, 2012.
- Berdichevsky, Norman (May 2012). "Israel: From Darling of the Left to Pariah State". New English Review. Archived from the original on October 12, 2017.
- Curran, Jeanne; Takata, Susan R. (2002). "Getting a Sample Isn't Always Easy". Dear Habermas. California State University—Dominguez Hills. Archived from the original on September 5, 2012.
- "U.S. Constitution: Twenty-second Amendment". Find Law.
- Giangreco, D. M. (April 7, 2002). "Soldier from Independence: Harry S. Truman and the Great War". U.S. Army Command and General Staff College.
- Gilwee, William J. (2000). "Capt. Harry Truman, Artilleryman and Future President". Doughboy Center: The Story of the American Expeditionary Forces. Worldwar1.com. Archived from the original on June 14, 2008.
- Goldstein, Steve (January 31, 2008). "First Daughter". Obit mag. Archived from the original on May 10, 2012.
- Hamby, Alonzo (July 8, 2002). "Presidency: How Do Historians Evaluate the Administration of Harry Truman?". History News Network. George Mason University.
- Higgs, Robert (March 1, 2004). "Truman's Attempt to Seize the Steel Industry". The Freeman. The Independent Institute.
- Jones, Tim (October 31, 2020). "Dewey defeats Truman". Chicago Tribune. p. 1.
- Miller, Henry I. (August 1, 2012). "The Nuking of Japan was a Tactical and Moral Imperative". Forbes. Archived from the original on August 4, 2012.
- Moynihan, Daniel Patrick (1997). "Chairman's Forward" (PDF). Moynihan Commission on Government Secrecy. Government Printing Office.
- "Reading 2: Goodwill Ambassador to the World". National Park Service. 1961. Archived from the original on June 27, 2007.
- Reynolds, Paul (August 3, 2005). "Hiroshima arguments rage 60 years on". BBC News.
- Roberts, Geoffrey (December 2000). "Historians and the Cold War". History Today.
- Smaltz, Donald C. (January 29, 1996). "Speech Delivered by Donald C. Smaltz". University of North Texas Libraries.
- Smith, Stephanie (March 18, 2008). "Former Presidents: Federal Pension and Retirement Benefits" (PDF). U.S. Senate Congressional Research Service.
- "America in the Second World War: The Manhattan Project". U.S. History. 2012.
- "Presidential Funerals: Services Following Deaths of American Presidents". Washington National Cathedral. 2012. Archived from the original on August 13, 2012.
- Winn, Kenneth H. "It All Adds Up: Reform and the Erosion of Representative Government in Missouri, 1900–2000". Missouri Secretary of State.
- Wooten, James T. (January 6, 1973). "Truman Honored By World Notables At Cathedral Rites". The New York Times. p. 1.
- "American President: A Reference Resource". Miller Center, University of Virginia. Archived from the original on October 30, 2012.
- "Biographical Dictionary of the Federal Judiciary". Washington, D.C.: Federal Judicial Center. Archived from the original on July 30, 2016. searches run from page, "select research categories" then check "court type" and "nominating president", then select U.S. District Courts (or U.S. Circuit Courts) and also Harry Truman.
- "C-SPAN Survey of Presidential Leadership". Archived from the original on February 17, 2009.
- "Siena College Research Institute 2022 Survey of U.S. Presidents" (PDF). 2022. Archived from the original (PDF) on July 7, 2023.
- "Chapter 12: The President Intervenes". U.S. Army Center of Military History. 2012. Archived from the original on August 24, 2012.
- "Executive Order 9981, Establishing the President's Committee on Equality of Treatment and Opportunity in the Armed Services, Harry S. Truman". Federal Register. National Archives. 1948.
- "Hall of Famous Missourians". Missouri House of Representatives.
- "Harry S. Truman: 2nd Confederate President". The Missouri Partisan Ranger. 1995.
- "Harry S. Truman – 1948". United States Federal Archives.
- "Harry S. Truman (1884–1972) Thirty-third President (1945–1952)". The Grand Lodge of Free and Accepted Masons of Pennsylvania. 2011. Archived from the original on July 17, 2012.
- "Harry S. Truman, 34th Vice President (1945)". United States Senate. 2012. Archived from the original on May 3, 2019.
- "Harry S. Truman Birthplace State Historic Site". Missouri State Parks and Historic Sites. 2012. Archived from the original on November 25, 2010.
- "Inauguration of the President: Fact & Firsts". United States Senate. 2005.
- "Interview Transcripts: The Potsdam Conference". The American Experience. PBS. 2012. Archived from the original on April 19, 2008.
- "Job Performance Ratings for President Truman". Public Opinion Archives. Roper Center. 2010. Archived from the original on February 8, 2013.
- "Truman Fellowship". Sandia National Laboratories.
- "Our History: A Living Memorial". Harry S. Truman Scholarship Foundation. Archived from the original on November 3, 2012.
- "Harry S. Truman School of Public Affairs". Truman School of Public Affairs, University of Missouri.
- "March 1, 1941: The Truman Committee". United States Senate.
- "Records of the Committee on Government Contract Compliance". United States Federal Archives.
- "State Department headquarters named for Harry S. Truman". CNN. Associated Press. September 22, 2000. Archived from the original on December 8, 2004.
- "Truman Reconstruction: 1948–1952". White House Museum. 1952.
- "U.S. Domestic Politics in the Early Cold War Era, 1947–1961". The Ohio State University. Archived from the original on June 5, 2011.
- "USS Harry S. Truman (CVN-75)". NavSource Online. July 10, 2012.

Political offices
Preceded by James E. Gilday	Judge of Jackson County, Missouri's Eastern District; 1923–1927	Succeeded by Henry Rummel
Preceded by Elihu W. Hayes	Presiding Judge of Jackson County, Missouri; 1927–1935	Succeeded by Eugene I. Purcell
Preceded by Henry A. Wallace	Vice President of the United States; 1945	Succeeded by Alben W. Barkley
Preceded by Franklin D. Roosevelt	President of the United States; 1945–1953	Succeeded by Dwight D. Eisenhower
Party political offices
Preceded by Charles Hay	Democratic nominee for U.S. Senator from Missouri (Class 1); 1934, 1940	Succeeded by Frank P. Briggs
Preceded by Henry A. Wallace	Democratic nominee for Vice President of the United States; 1944	Succeeded by Alben W. Barkley
Preceded by Franklin D. Roosevelt	Democratic nominee for President of the United States; 1948	Succeeded by Adlai Stevenson II
U.S. Senate
Preceded by Roscoe C. Patterson	United States Senator (Class 1) from Missouri; 1935–1945; Served alongside: Bennett Champ Clark, Forrest C. Donnell	Succeeded by Frank P. Briggs
New office	Chair of the Senate National Defense Program Committee; 1941–1944	Succeeded by James M. Mead
