= 1940 Missouri Attorney General election =

- November 5, 1940
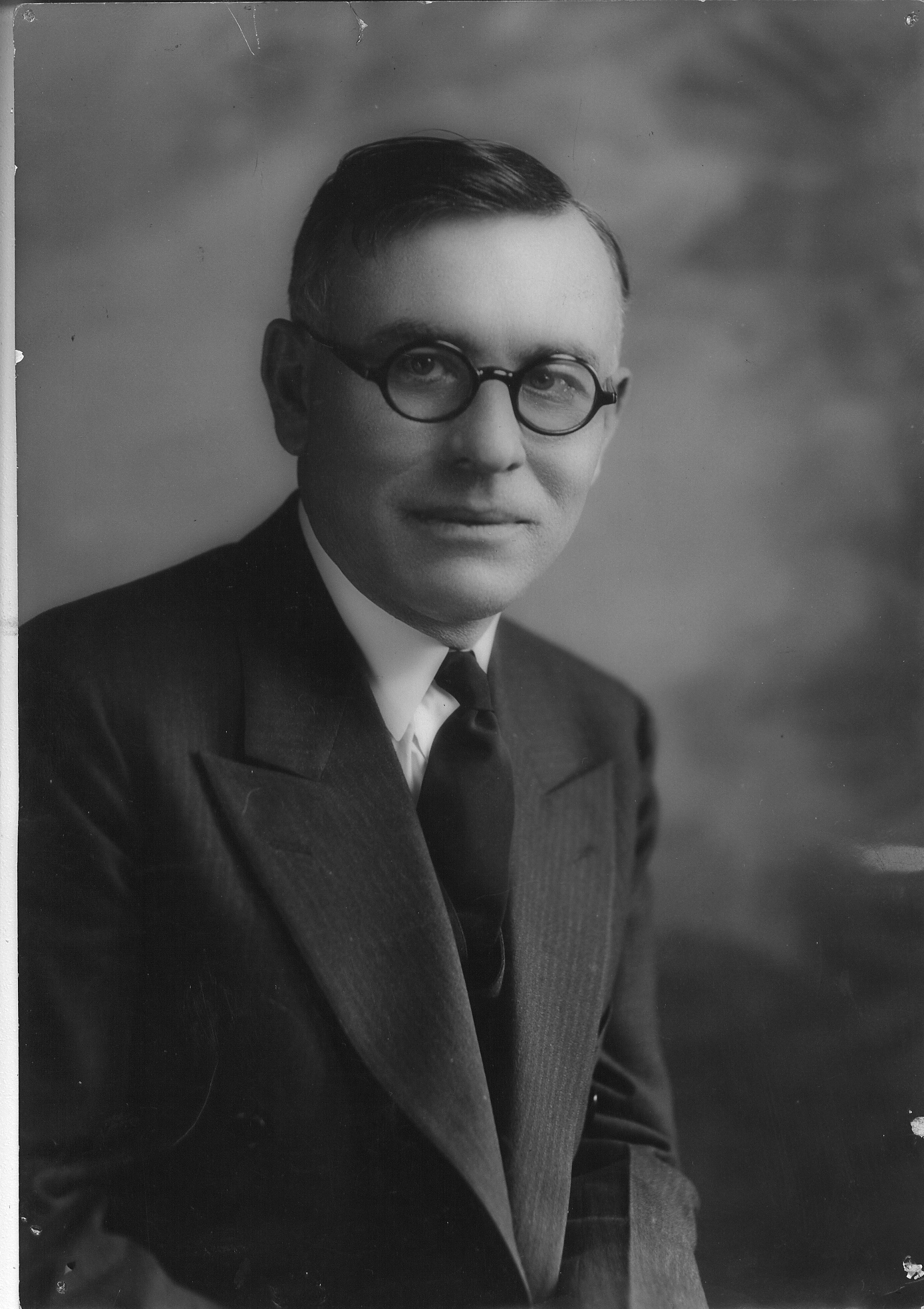

Nominee	Roy McKittrick	Ray Mabee
Party	Democratic	Republican
Popular vote	955,225	859,619
Percentage	52.59%	47.32%
Attorney General before election
Roy McKittrick
Democratic
Elected Attorney General
Roy McKittrick
Democratic

The 1940 Missouri Attorney General election was held on November 5, 1940, in order to elect the attorney general of Missouri. Democratic nominee and incumbent attorney general Roy McKittrick defeated Republican nominee and incumbent member of the Missouri Senate Ray Mabee and Socialist nominee Edward J. Flynn.

== General election ==
On election day, November 5, 1940, Democratic nominee Roy McKittrick won re-election by a margin of 95,606 votes against his foremost opponent Republican nominee Ray Mabee, thereby retaining Democratic control over the office of attorney general. McKittrick was sworn in for his third term on January 13, 1941.

=== Results ===
Missouri Attorney General election, 1940
Party	Candidate	Votes	%
Democratic	Roy McKittrick (incumbent)	955,225	52.59
Republican	Ray Mabee	859,619	47.32
Socialist	Edward J. Flynn	1,605	0.09
Total votes		1,816,449	100.00
Democratic hold			

== See also ==
- 1940 Missouri gubernatorial election
