= 1932 Missouri Attorney General election =

- November 8, 1932
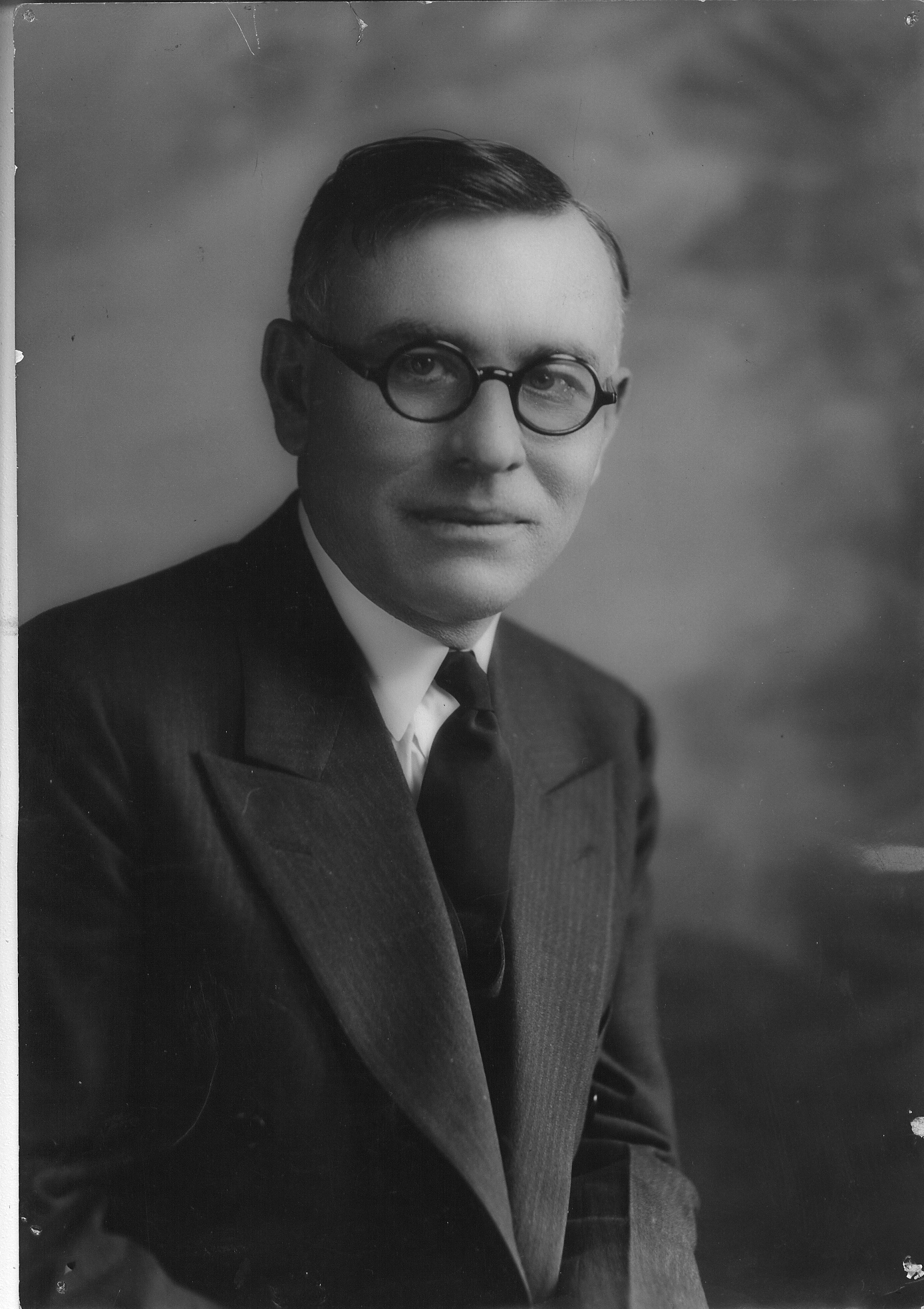

Nominee	Roy McKittrick	Henry Depping
Party	Democratic	Republican
Popular vote	998,856	595,879
Percentage	62.18%	37.09%
Attorney General before election
Stratton Shartel
Republican
Elected Attorney General
Roy McKittrick
Democratic

The 1932 Missouri Attorney General election was held on November 8, 1932, in order to elect the attorney general of Missouri. Democratic nominee and incumbent member of the Missouri Senate Roy McKittrick defeated Republican nominee Henry Depping and Socialist nominee Burl O. Hereford.

== General election ==
On election day, November 8, 1932, Democratic nominee Roy McKittrick won the election by a margin of 402,977 votes against his foremost opponent Republican nominee Henry Depping, thereby gaining Democratic control over the office of attorney general. McKittrick was sworn in as the 32nd attorney general of Missouri on January 9, 1933.

=== Results ===
Missouri Attorney General election, 1932
Party	Candidate	Votes	%
Democratic	Roy McKittrick	998,856	62.18
Republican	Henry Depping	595,879	37.09
Socialist	Burl O. Hereford	11,787	0.73
Total votes		1,606,522	100.00
Democratic gain from Republican			

== See also ==
- 1932 Missouri gubernatorial election
