= 1936 Missouri Attorney General election =

- November 3, 1936
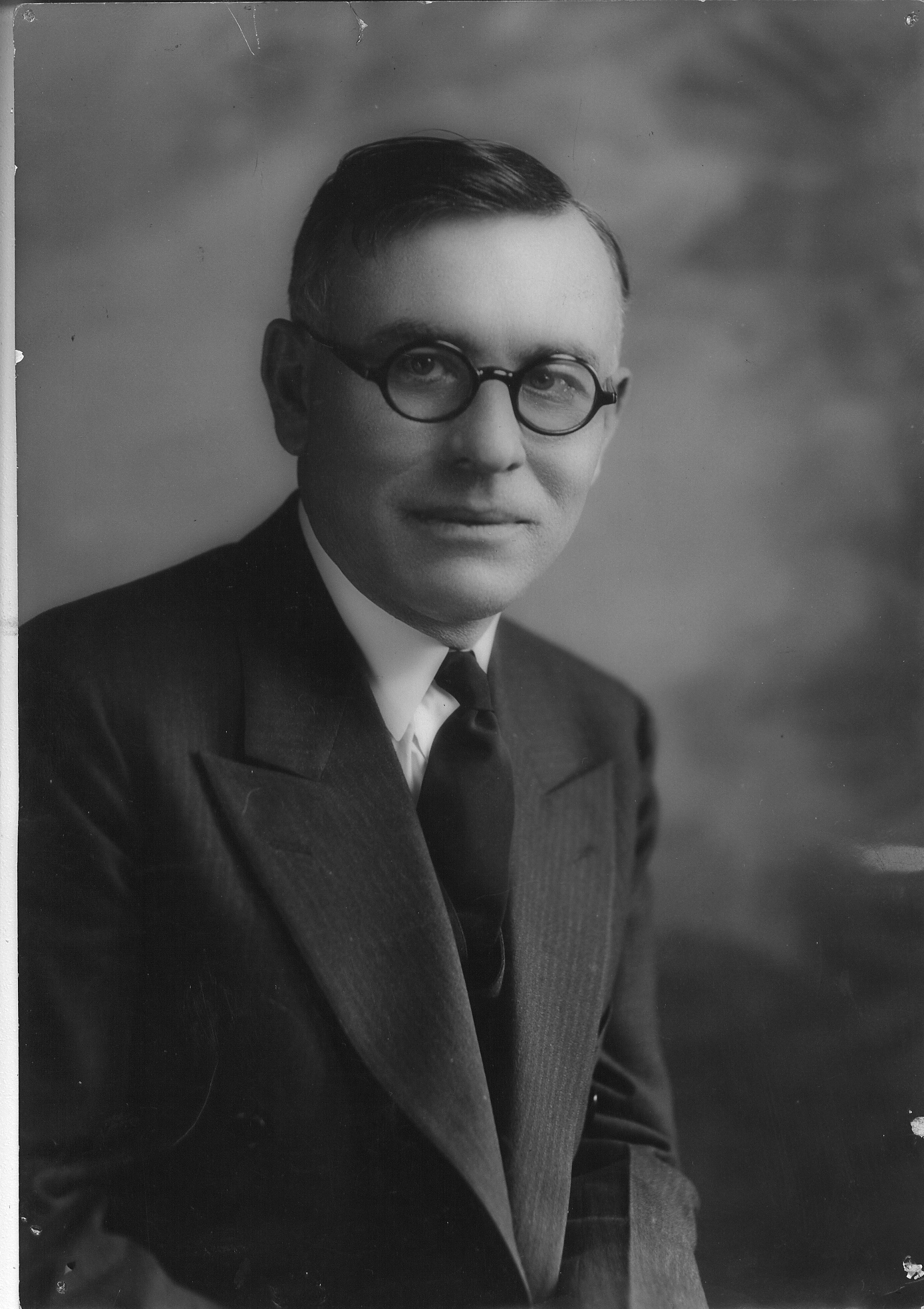

Nominee	Roy McKittrick	J. Grant Frye
Party	Democratic	Republican
Popular vote	1,090,914	714,158
Percentage	60.42%	39.56%
Attorney General before election
Roy McKittrick
Democratic
Elected Attorney General
Roy McKittrick
Democratic

The 1936 Missouri Attorney General election was held on November 3, 1936, in order to elect the attorney general of Missouri. Democratic nominee and incumbent attorney general Roy McKittrick defeated Republican nominee J. Grant Frye and Socialist Labor nominee Theodore Vaszily.

== General election ==
On election day, November 3, 1936, Democratic nominee Roy McKittrick won re-election by a margin of 376,756 votes against his foremost opponent Republican nominee J. Grant Frye, thereby retaining Democratic control over the office of attorney general. McKittrick was sworn in for his second term on January 11, 1937.

=== Results ===
Missouri Attorney General election, 1936
Party	Candidate	Votes	%
Democratic	Roy McKittrick (incumbent)	1,090,914	60.42
Republican	J. Grant Frye	714,158	39.56
Socialist Labor	Theodore Vaszily	370	0.02
Total votes		1,805,442	100.00
Democratic hold			

== See also ==
- 1936 Missouri gubernatorial election
