= 1928 Missouri Attorney General election =

- November 6, 1928

Nominee	Stratton Shartel	Elmer O. Jones
Party	Republican	Democratic
Popular vote	800,607	713,661
Percentage	52.86%	47.12%
Attorney General before election
Stratton Shartel (Acting)
Republican
Elected Attorney General
Stratton Shartel
Republican

The 1928 Missouri Attorney General election was held on November 6, 1928, in order to elect the attorney general of Missouri. Republican nominee and incumbent acting attorney general Stratton Shartel defeated Democratic nominee Elmer O. Jones and Socialist Labor nominee Theodore Baeff.

== General election ==
On election day, November 6, 1928, Republican nominee Stratton Shartel won the election by a margin of 86,946 votes against his foremost opponent Democratic nominee Elmer O. Jones, thereby retaining Republican control over the office of attorney general. Shartel was sworn in for his first full term on January 14, 1929.

=== Results ===
Missouri Attorney General election, 1928
Party	Candidate	Votes	%
Republican	Stratton Shartel (incumbent)	800,607	52.86
Democratic	Elmer O. Jones	713,661	47.12
Socialist Labor	Theodore Baeff	300	0.02
Total votes		1,514,568	100.00
Republican hold			

== See also ==
- 1928 Missouri gubernatorial election
