= 1940 Missouri gubernatorial election =

- November 5, 1940
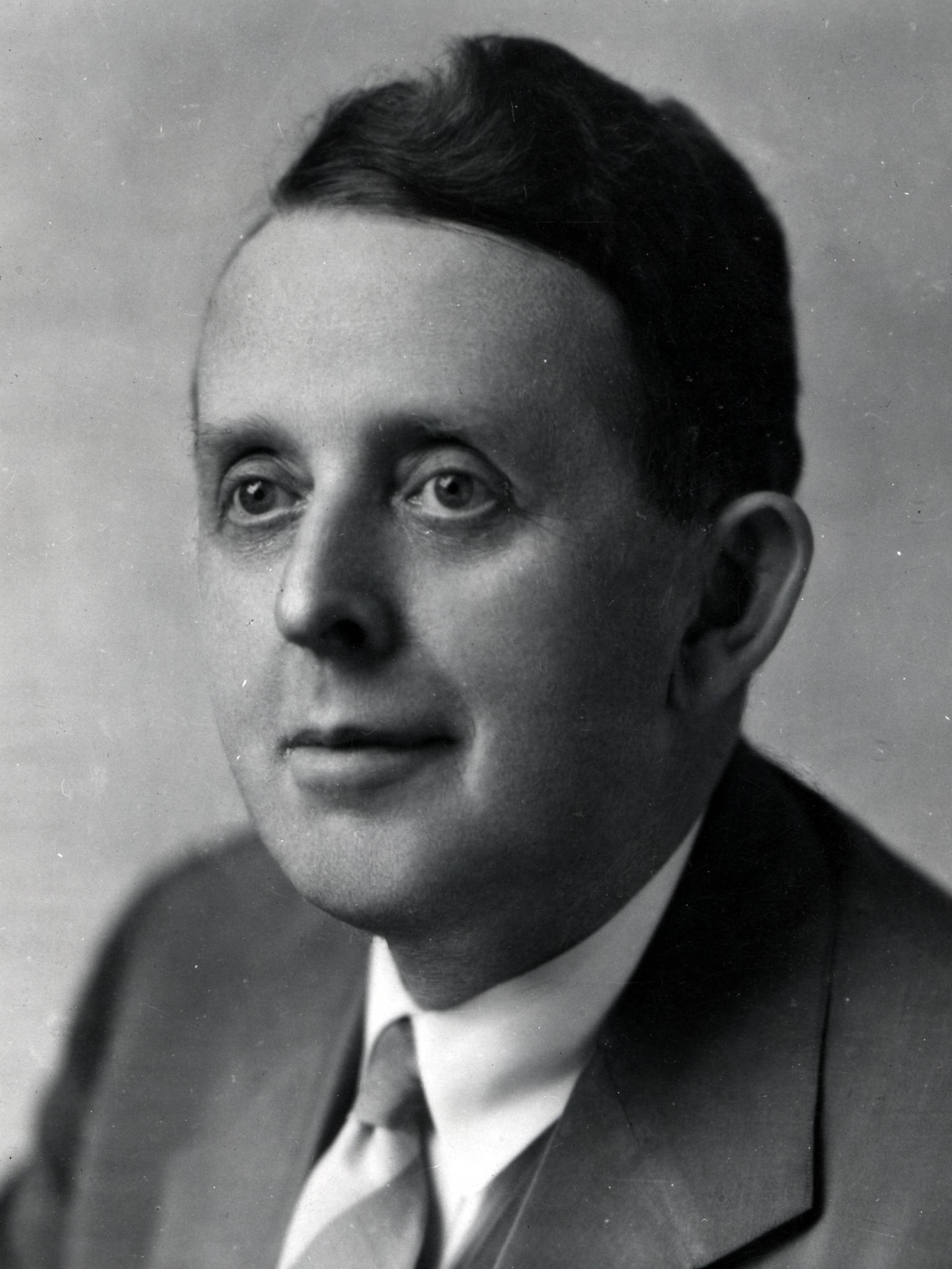

Nominee	Forrest C. Donnell	Larry McDaniel
Party	Republican	Democratic
Popular vote	911,530	907,917
Percentage	50.05%	49.85%
- County results Donnell: 50–60% 60–70% 70–80% 80–90% McDaniel: 50–60% 60–70% 70–80% 80–90%
Governor before election
Lloyd C. Stark
Democratic
Elected Governor
Forrest C. Donnell
Republican

The 1940 Missouri gubernatorial election was held on November 5, 1940, and resulted in a victory for the Republican nominee, Forrest C. Donnell, over the Democratic nominee, Lawrence "Larry" McDaniel, and candidates representing the Socialist and Socialist Labor parties. Democrats delayed Donnell's inauguration for six weeks as they unsuccessfully attempted to overturn the election result in an incident called the "Great Governorship Steal", which was ended by an order from the Missouri Supreme Court.

== Democratic primary ==
=== Campaign ===
In the Democratic primary, Excise Commissioner of St. Louis Larry McDaniel defeated State Senator Allen McReynolds of Carthage. McDaniel had the support of the urban Democratic political machines of Tom Pendergast in Kansas City and Mayor Bernard F. Dickmann in St. Louis, while McReynolds was supported by anti-machine reformists.

=== Results ===
Democratic primary results
Party	Candidate	Votes	%
Democratic	Larry McDaniel	323,395	49.56
Democratic	Allen McReynolds	252,441	38.68
Democratic	Ferd J. Frankenhoff	64,992	9.96
Democratic	Guy W. Runnion	11,753	1.80
Total votes		652,581	100

== Results ==
Divisions among Democrats from the primary, along with reformist opposition to the Pendergast and Dickmann machines, allowed the Republican Donnell to obtain a narrow majority even as the state narrowly re-elected President Franklin Delano Roosevelt and Senator Harry S. Truman, both Democrats.

1940 gubernatorial election, Missouri
Party	Candidate	Votes	%	±%
Republican	Forrest C. Donnell	911,530	50.05	+7.52
Democratic	Larry McDaniel	907,917	49.85	−7.21
Socialist	Jed A. High	1,555	0.09	−0.06
Socialist Labor	William Wesley Cox	205	0.01	−0.01
Majority		3,613	0.20	−14.34
Turnout		1,821,207	48.12	−1.96
Republican gain from Democratic		Swing		

== Aftermath ==
Donnell's win was a disaster for the Democratic machines due to the governorship's control over judgeships, boards, and commissions that could be used for political patronage. Immediately after the election, Missouri Democratic Party chairman C. Marion Hulen claimed that electoral fraud and vote-buying were responsible for Donnell's victory. On November 13, Hulen met with Senator Bennett Champ Clark, St. Louis Mayor Bernard F. Dickmann, state Attorney General Roy McKittrick, St. Louis Democratic Party chairman Robert Hannegan, and others at the DeSoto Hotel in St. Louis, where they were suspected of strategizing how to overturn the election. One concern of the Democrats was that calling for a recount would allow Donnell to be seated provisionally as Governor and exercise the powers of the office.

On December 30, Hulen proposed to the Democratic state committee in Jefferson City that under Article V of the 1875 Missouri Constitution, the new governor could not be lawfully sworn in until the speaker of the state House of Representatives announced the results to the public, which he could decline to do on account of election fraud. On January 8, the state legislature voted for Joint Resolution No. 3, barring House Speaker Morris E. Osburn from proclaiming Donnell's election until a special joint legislative committee chaired by State Senator L. N. Searcy had re-examined the gubernatorial ballots for irregularities. Citing this resolution, Osburn refused to announce Donnell's election on January 10.

On January 13, the date when all newly elected statewide officials were to start their term, Chief Justice Charles A. Leedy, Jr. swore in all statewide elected officials except for Donnell. Governor Lloyd Stark, an anti-machine Democrat who openly opposed the attempt to overturn the election results and had vetoed Joint Resolution No. 3, remained in office as a caretaker. The same day, Donnell and three lawyers affiliated with the state Republican Party filed two lawsuits, one to compel Osburn to announce Donnell as duly elected, and the other to bar the Searcy committee from examining any ballots. The cases were consolidated and argued before the Supreme Court on February 11. With public opinion decidedly against the Democrats, the court on February 19 unanimously ordered Osburn to tabulate and proclaim the election results as provided, bypassing the attempts at a legislative recount. Donnell was sworn in as Governor the next day.

McDaniel formally requested a recount of the election on March 4. After initial retabulations indicated Donnell's margin of victory would grow beyond 7,000, McDaniel withdrew the request and conceded the election on May 21. The Searcy committee disbanded shortly afterward.

The incident has been called the "Great Governorship Steal" in various sources.
