= 1940 Missouri Secretary of State election =

- November 5, 1940

Nominee	Dwight H. Brown	Loyd Miller
Party	Democratic	Republican
Popular vote	963,017	853,356
Percentage	52.97%	46.94%
Secretary of State before election
Dwight H. Brown
Democratic
Elected Secretary of State
Dwight H. Brown
Democratic

The 1940 Missouri Secretary of State election was held on November 5, 1940, in order to elect the secretary of state of Missouri. Democratic nominee and incumbent secretary of state Dwight H. Brown defeated Republican nominee Loyd Miller, Socialist nominee Henry Siroky and Socialist Labor nominee Henry W. Genck.

== General election ==
On election day, November 5, 1940, Democratic nominee Dwight H. Brown won re-election by a margin of 109,661 votes against his foremost opponent Republican nominee Loyd Miller, thereby retaining Democratic control over the office of secretary of state. Brown was sworn in for his third term on January 13, 1941.

=== Results ===
Missouri Secretary of State election, 1940
Party	Candidate	Votes	%
Democratic	Dwight H. Brown (incumbent)	963,017	52.97
Republican	Loyd Miller	853,356	46.94
Socialist	Henry Siroky	1,583	0.08
Socialist Labor	Henry W. Genck	200	0.01
Total votes		1,818,156	100.00
Democratic hold			

== See also ==
- 1940 Missouri gubernatorial election
