= 1928 Missouri Secretary of State election =

- November 6, 1928

| Nominee | Charles Becker | Dwight H. Brown |
| Party | Republican | Democratic |
| Popular vote | 805,146 | 708,295 |
| Percentage | 53.11% | 46.72% |
Secretary of State before election
Charles Becker
Republican
Elected Secretary of State
Charles Becker
Republican

The 1928 Missouri Secretary of State election was held on November 6, 1928, in order to elect the secretary of state of Missouri. Republican nominee and incumbent secretary of state Charles Becker defeated Democratic nominee Dwight H. Brown, Socialist nominee Gottlieb A. Hoehn and Socialist Labor nominee Leo L. Aberle.

== General election ==
On election day, November 6, 1928, Republican nominee Charles Becker won re-election by a margin of 96,851 votes against his foremost opponent Democratic nominee Dwight H. Brown, thereby retaining Republican control over the office of secretary of state. Becker was sworn in for his third term on January 14, 1929.

=== Results ===
Missouri Secretary of State election, 1928
| Party | Candidate | Votes | % |
|---|---|---|---|
| Republican | Charles Becker (incumbent) | 805,146 | 53.11 |
| Democratic | Dwight H. Brown | 708,295 | 46.72 |
| Socialist | Gottlieb A. Hoehn | 2,412 | 0.16 |
| Socialist Labor | Leo L. Aberle | 229 | 0.01 |
| Total votes | | 1,516,082 | 100.00 |
| Republican hold | | | |

== See also ==
- 1928 Missouri gubernatorial election
