= Senator Searcy =

Senator Searcy may refer to:

- Lemuel Searcy (1882–1944), Missouri State Senate
- Sam Searcy (born 1977), North Carolina State Senate
