= 1950 United States Senate election in Missouri =

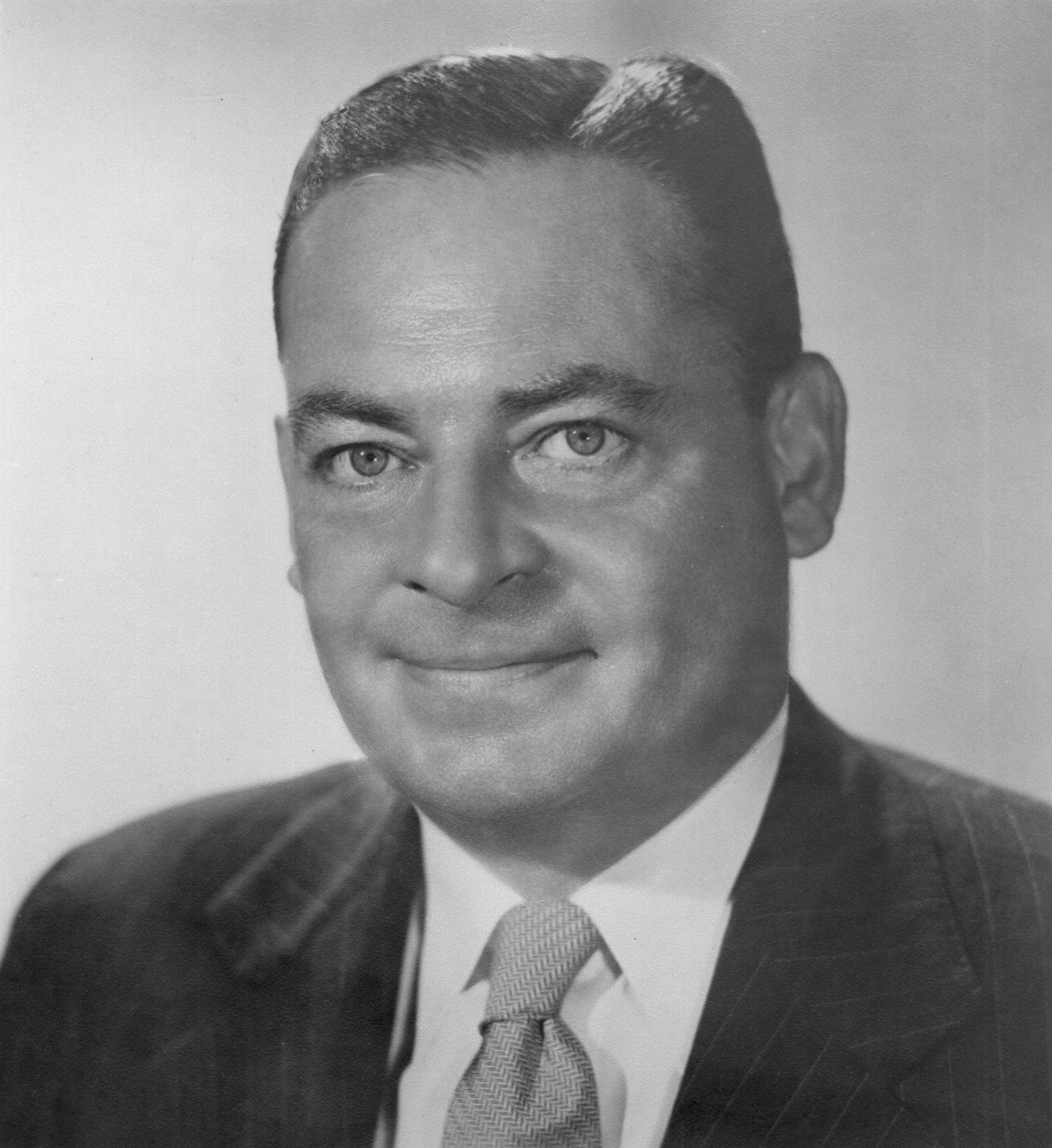

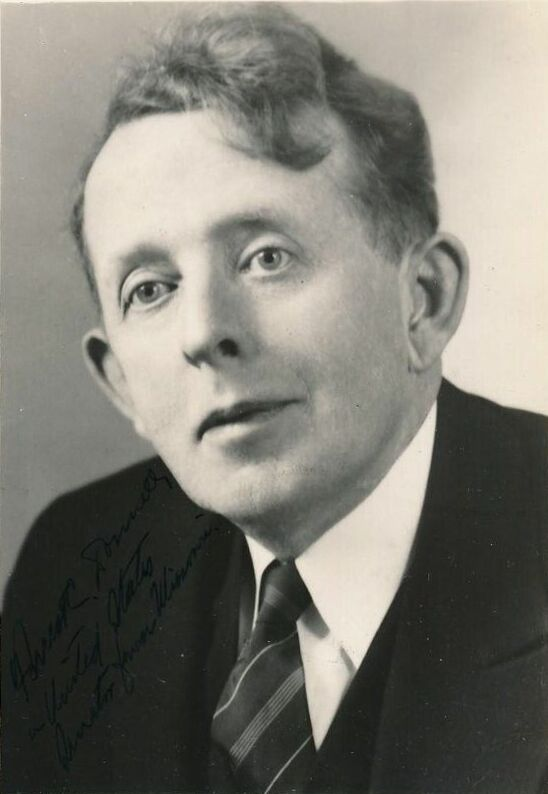
Nominee	Thomas C. Hennings Jr.	Forrest C. Donnell
Party	Democratic	Republican
Popular vote	685,732	592,922
Percentage	53.60%	46.34%
- County results Hennings: 50–60% 60–70% 70–80% 80–90% Donnell: 50–60% 60–70% 70–80% 80–90%
U.S. senator before election
Forrest C. Donnell
Republican
Elected U.S. senator
Thomas C. Hennings Jr.
Democratic

The 1950 United States Senate election in Missouri took place on November 7, 1950 in Missouri. Incumbent Republican Senator Forrest C. Donnell ran for a second term in office but was defeated by Democratic nominee Thomas C. Hennings Jr.

== Democratic primary ==
=== Candidates ===
- Emery Allison, former State Senator from Maries County
- Thomas C. Hennings Jr., lawyer and former U.S. Representative from St. Louis
- Marjorie Bell Hinrichs, cosmetics manufacturer
- James W. Hopkins, accountant
- Ben M. Johnson, contractor

=== Results ===
Democratic primary August 1, 1950
Party	Candidate	Votes	%
Democratic	Thomas C. Hennings Jr.	182,333	45.03
Democratic	Emery Allison	178,201	44.01
Democratic	James W. Hopkins	15,859	3.92
Democratic	Ben M. Johnson	15,559	3.84
Democratic	Marjorie Bell Hinrichs	12,986	3.21
Total votes		404,938	100

== Republican primary ==
=== Candidates ===
- Gordon R. Coates, building materials dealer
- Forrest C. Donnell, incumbent Senator since 1945
- William McKinley Thomas, furniture warehouse employee

=== Results ===
Republican primary August 1, 1950
Party	Candidate	Votes	%
Republican	Forrest C. Donnell (incumbent)	200,792	84.85
Republican	William McKinley Thomas	17,407	7.36
Republican	Gordon R. Coates	10,919	4.61
Republican	Hiram Grosby	7,527	3.18
Total votes		236,645	100

== General election ==
=== Candidates ===
- Forrest C. Donnell, incumbent Senator since 1945 (Republican)
- Henry W. Genck (Socialist Labor)
- John W. Hamilton (Christian Nationalist)
- Thomas C. Hennings Jr., lawyer and former U.S. Representative from St. Louis (Democratic)

=== Results ===
1950 United States Senate election in Missouri
Party	Candidate	Votes	%	±%
Democratic	Thomas C. Hennings Jr.	685,732	53.60	+3.78
Republican	Forrest C. Donnell (incumbent)	592,922	46.34	−3.61
Christian Nationalist	John W. Hamilton	610	0.05	+0.05
Socialist Labor	Henry W. Genck	150	0.01	+0.00
Majority		92,810	7.26	
Turnout		1,279,414		
Democratic gain from Republican		Swing		
