= Henry S. Caulfield =

American lawyer and politician (1873–1966)

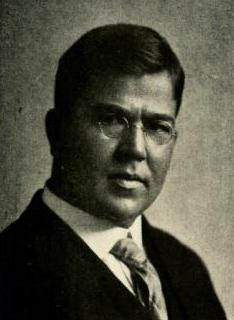

37th Governor of Missouri
- In office January 14, 1929 – January 9, 1933
- Lieutenant: Edward Henry Winter
- Preceded by: Sam Aaron Baker
- Succeeded by: Guy Brasfield Park

Member of the U.S. House of Representatives from Missouri's 11th district
- In office March 4, 1907 – March 3, 1909
- Preceded by: John T. Hunt
- Succeeded by: Patrick F. Gill

Personal details
- Born: Henry Stewart Caulfield; December 9, 1873 St. Louis, Missouri, US
- Died: May 11, 1966 (aged 92) St. Louis, Missouri, US
- Resting place: Oak Grove Cemetery, St. Louis, MO
- Party: Republican
- Spouse(s): Adele Lopez (m. 1897, d. 1898); Fannie Alice Delano (m. 1902, d. 1961)
- Children: 4
- Education: Washington University in St. Louis
- Profession: Attorney; Judge

Henry Stewart Caulfield (December 9, 1873 – May 11, 1966) was an American lawyer and Republican politician from St. Louis, Missouri. He represented Missouri in the U.S. House from 1907 to 1909 and was the 37th governor of Missouri from 1929 to 1933.

== Biography ==
Caulfield was born in St. Louis, Missouri on December 9, 1873. He attended the public schools of St. Louis public schools and St. Charles College of Missouri. In 1895 Caulfield graduated from Washington University School of Law in St. Louis. He was admitted to the bar later that year and practiced in St. Louis.

In 1904, Caulfield ran unsuccessfully for the House of Representatives of the United States. In 1906 he was the successful Republican nominee for a seat in the House. He served in the 60th Congress (March 4, 1907 – March 3, 1909), and was not a candidate for renomination in 1908.

After Caulfield left Congress, Governor Herbert S. Hadley appointed him state excise commissioner in St. Louis, and Caulfield served from 1909 to 1910. From 1910 to 1912 Caulfield served as Judge of the Missouri Court of Appeals for the Eastern District, based in St. Louis. In 1914 Caulfield served as counsel for the St. Louis City and County Board of Freeholders. In 1921 and 1922 Caulfield was St. Louis City Counselor. In 1925 and 1926 he was chairman of the Board of Freeholders.

In 1928 Caulfield ran successfully for Governor of Missouri, and he served from January 14, 1929 to January 9, 1933. During his term Caulfield founded the Missouri State Highway Patrol, and worked to cope with strains on the state budget caused by the Great Depression. Near the end of his term in 1933 state legislature, which was controlled by Republicans, attempted to gerrymander Congressional districts in order elect more Republicans. Caulfield vetoed the bill, which forced Missouri's U.S. House members to run at-large, resulting in Democratic candidates winning every seat.

Caulfield was the keynote speaker at the 1932 Republican National Convention. In 1937 and 1938 he served on the St. Louis Board of Election Commissioners. He was the unsuccessful Republican nominee for United States Senator in 1938, losing to incumbent Democrat Bennett Champ Clark. From 1941 to 1949 he served as director of public welfare in St. Louis. He then resumed the practice of law, and in 1953 served as a member of the State Reorganization Commission, which proposed reforms to state government.

== Death and burial ==
Caulfield died in St. Louis on May 11, 1966. He was interred at Oak Grove Cemetery in St. Louis.

== Family ==
His brother William E. Caulfield (1871-1946) was also involved in politics, and served on the St. Louis City Council, in the Missouri House of Representatives, and in the Missouri State Senate.

Caulfield was married twice. In 1897 he married Adele Lopez, who died in 1898. In 1902 he married Fannie Alice Delano, and they were the parents of four children.

Party political offices
Preceded by Sam Aaron Baker	Republican nominee for Governor of Missouri; 1928	Succeeded by Edward Henry Winter
Preceded by Henry Kiel	Republican nominee for U.S. Senator from Missouri (Class 3); 1938	Succeeded by Forrest C. Donnell
U.S. House of Representatives
Preceded by John T. Hunt	Member of the U.S. House of Representatives from Missouri's 11th congressional district 1907–1909	Succeeded by Patrick F. Gill
Political offices
Preceded by Sam Aaron Baker	Governor of Missouri; 1929–1933	Succeeded by Guy Park
