= 1956 United States Senate election in Missouri =

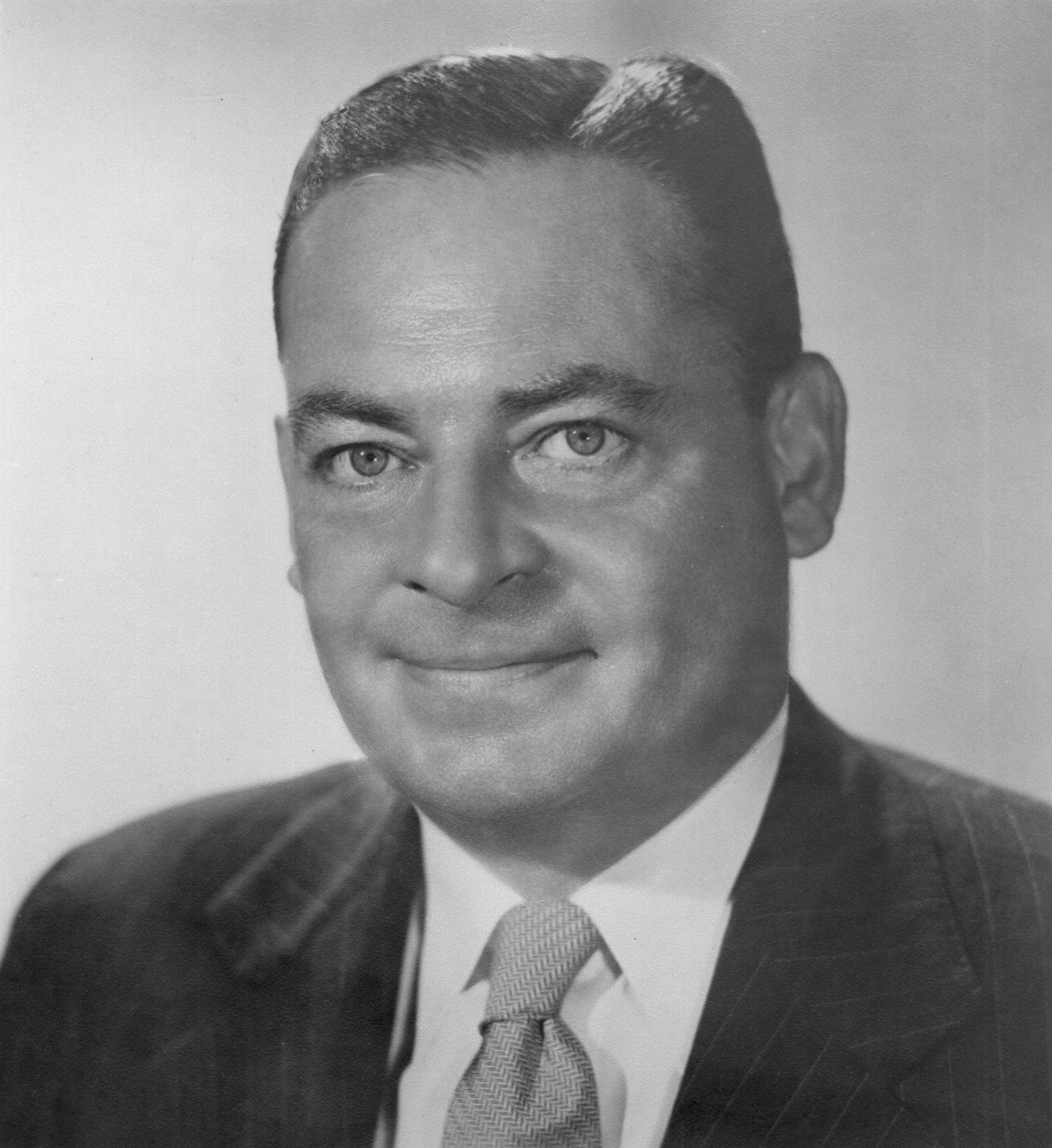

Nominee	Thomas C. Hennings Jr.	Herbert Douglas
Party	Democratic	Republican
Popular vote	1,015,936	785,048
Percentage	56.41%	43.59%
- County results Hennings: 50–60% 60–70% 70–80% 80–90% Douglas: 50–60% 60–70% 70–80%
U.S. senator before election
Thomas C. Hennings Jr.
Democratic
Elected U.S. senator
Thomas C. Hennings Jr.
Democratic

The 1956 United States Senate election in Missouri took place on November 6, 1956 in Missouri. The incumbent Democratic Senator, Thomas C. Hennings Jr., was re-elected. He defeated Republican nominee Herbert Douglas, winning 56.4% of the vote. Hennings outperformed Democratic presidential nominee Adlai Stevenson II, who won 50.1% in the presidential election in Missouri.

== Democratic primary ==
=== Candidates ===
- Thomas C. Hennings Jr., incumbent Senator since 1951

==== Withdrew ====
- Tom J. Gavin, Kansas City councilman (name remained on ballot)

=== Results ===
Democratic primary August 7, 1956
Party	Candidate	Votes	%
Democratic	Thomas C. Hennings Jr. (incumbent)	389,986	95.91
Democratic	Tom J. Gavin	16,624	4.09
Total votes		406,610	100

== Republican primary ==
=== Candidates ===
- Herbert Douglas, attorney and candidate for Missouri Attorney General in 1948
- Albert E. Schoenbeck, attorney
- William McKinley Thomas, furniture warehouse employee
- William E. Van Taay, director of economics and sociology at Fontbonne University

=== Results ===
Republican primary August 7, 1956
Party	Candidate	Votes	%
Republican	Herbert Douglas	83,458	40.77
Republican	Albert E. Schoenbeck	78,747	38.47
Republican	William McKinley Thomas	28,924	14.13
Republican	William E. Van Taay	13,556	6.62
Total votes		204,685	100

== General election ==
1956 United States Senate election in Missouri
Party	Candidate	Votes	%	±%
Democratic	Thomas C. Hennings Jr. (incumbent)	1,015,936	56.41	+2.81
Republican	Herbert Douglas	785,048	43.59	−2.75
Majority		230,888	12.82	
Turnout		1,800,984		
Democratic hold				
