= 1944 United States Senate election in Missouri =

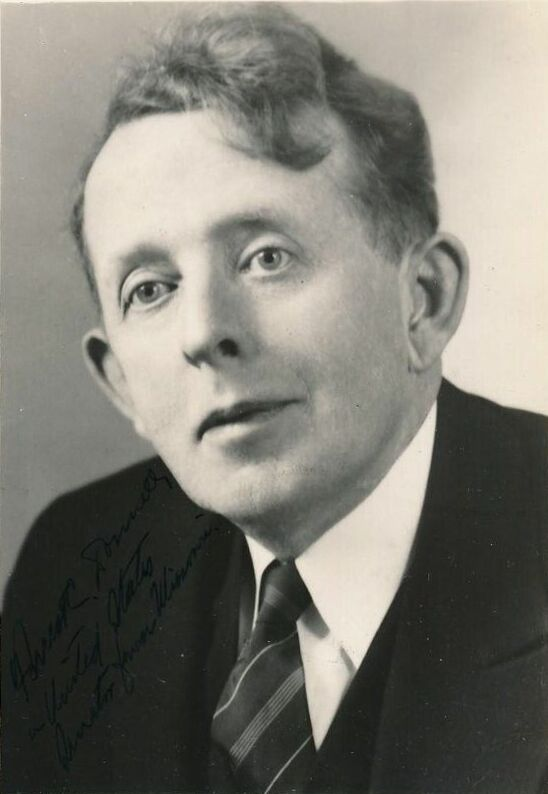

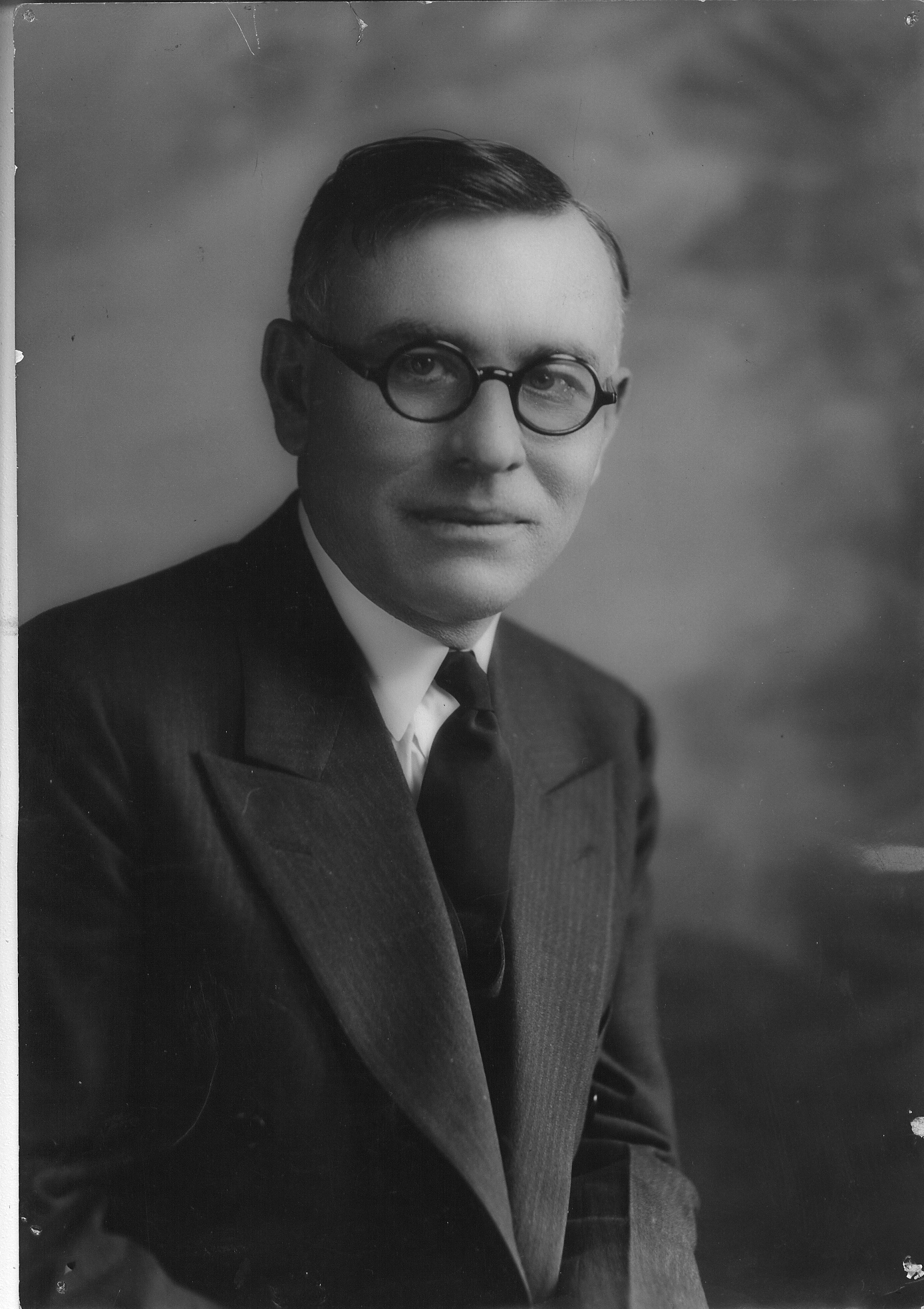
Nominee	Forrest C. Donnell	Roy McKittrick
Party	Republican	Democratic
Popular vote	778,778	776,790
Percentage	49.95%	49.82%
- County results Donnell: 50–60% 60–70% 70–80% 80–90% McKittrick: 50–60% 60–70% 70–80% 80–90%
U.S. senator before election
Bennett Champ Clark
Democratic
Elected U.S. senator
Forrest C. Donnell
Republican

The 1944 United States Senate election in Missouri took place on November 7, 1944 in Missouri. Incumbent Democratic Senator Bennett Champ Clark was defeated in the primary by Roy McKittrick, who went on to lose the general election to Republican nominee Forrest C. Donnell, the Governor of Missouri. Donnell outperformed presidential candidate Thomas E. Dewey, who lost the state with 48.4% of the vote in the presidential election. The state's other senator Harry S. Truman was also running for Vice President with President Franklin D. Roosevelt on the same ballot, and during the campaign, Donnell stated he would not appoint a successor for Truman regardless of the outcome of his own race as he prioritized fairness over political pressure from his own party, believing the state's next elected Governor should appoint Truman's successor. Donnell was also elected to the Senate seat once held by his former law partner Selden Spencer.

== Democratic primary ==
=== Candidates ===
- Bennett Champ Clark, incumbent Senator since 1933
- Roy McKittrick, Attorney General of Missouri

=== Results ===
Democratic primary August 1, 1944
Party	Candidate	Votes	%
Democratic	Roy McKittrick	172,566	52.73
Democratic	Bennett Champ Clark (incumbent)	154,669	47.27
Total votes		327,235	100

== Republican primary ==
=== Candidates ===
- Forrest C. Donnell, Governor of Missouri
- H. Grosby, physician
- Charles P. Noell, lawyer
- Charles E. Rendlen, lawyer
- Charles Shaw, former Mayor of Clayton
- Howard V. Stephens, president of Johnson-Stephen and Shinkle Shoe Company and former member of the St. Louis Board of Police Commissioners
- William McKinley Thomas, International Shoe Company employee

=== Results ===
Republican primary August 1, 1944
Party	Candidate	Votes	%
Republican	Forrest C. Donnell	147,762	49.58
Republican	Howard V. Stephens	64,301	21.58
Republican	Charles Shaw	43,616	14.64
Republican	Charles E. Rendlen	20,412	6.85
Republican	Charles P. Noell	14,847	4.98
Republican	William McKinley Thomas	4,284	1.44
Republican	H. Grosby	2,786	0.93
Total votes		298,008	100

== General election ==
=== Candidates ===
- William Wesley Cox, state chairman and nominee for President in 1920 (Socialist Labor)
- Forrest C. Donnell, Governor of Missouri (Republican)
- Roy McKittrick, Attorney General of Missouri (Democratic)
- D. B. Preisler (Socialist)

=== Results ===
1944 United States Senate election in Missouri
Party	Candidate	Votes	%	±%
Republican	Forrest C. Donnell	778,778	49.95%	+10.80
Democratic	Roy McKittrick	776,790	49.82%	−10.87
Socialist	D. B. Preisler	3,320	0.21%	+0.07
Socialist Labor	William Wesley Cox	215	0.01%	−0.01
Majority		1,988	0.13%	
Turnout		1,559,103		
Republican gain from Democratic		Swing		
