= Lloyd C. Stark =

American businessman and politician (1886–1972)

Lloyd Stark
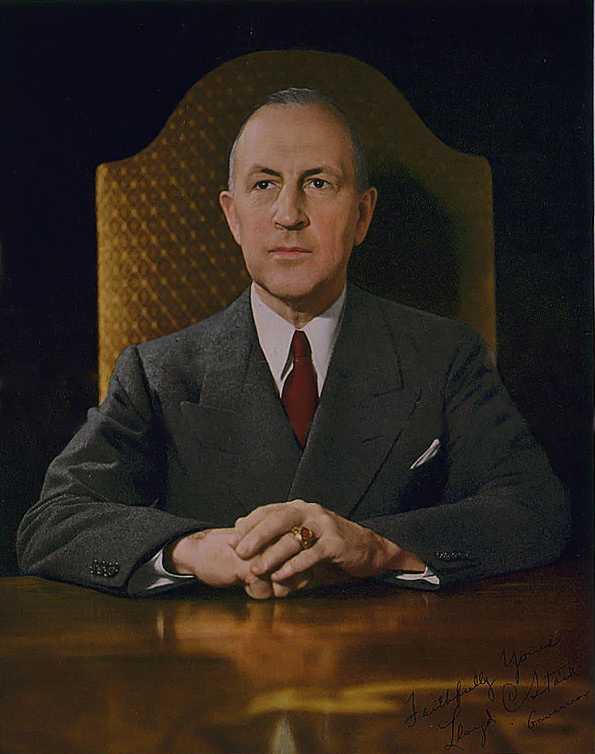

39th Governor of Missouri
- In office January 11, 1937 – February 26, 1941
- Lieutenant: Frank Gaines Harris
- Preceded by: Guy Brasfield Park
- Succeeded by: Forrest C. Donnell

Chair of the National Governors Association
- In office June 26, 1939 – June 2, 1940
- Preceded by: Roy Cochran
- Succeeded by: William Henry Vanderbilt III

Personal details
- Born: Lloyd Crow Stark; November 23, 1886 Louisiana, Missouri, U.S.
- Died: September 17, 1972 (aged 85) Clayton, Missouri, U.S.
- Party: Democratic
- Education: United States Naval Academy (BS)

Lloyd Crow Stark (November 23, 1886 – September 17, 1972) was an American businessman and politician who served as the 39th governor of Missouri. He was a member of the Democratic Party.

== Biography ==
Stark was born in Louisiana, Missouri, the son of Clarence McDowell and Lillie Crow Stark. Stark was a 1908 graduate of the United States Naval Academy. After serving four years as a naval officer, Stark went into the family business, the Stark Brothers' Nursery, as vice-president and general manager. When World War I broke out, he volunteered for the Army, and served in the United States and France, including the 1918 Meuse-Argonne Offensive.

Stark's political career began in 1928, when he chaired Missouri's State Highway Bond Campaign. He served one term as the governor of Missouri from 1937 to 1941 and was a delegate to Democratic National Convention from Missouri in 1940. During his gubernatorial term, Stark's administration established the Ellis Fischel Cancer Center, abolished interstate trade barriers, passed a police reorganization bill, and established a merit system for selection of state employees.

The falling out between Stark and the Kansas City boss Tom Pendergast following the 1936 election is widely believed to have been the turning point in Pendergast's fall from power. Pendergast had held so much sway in Missouri in the 1930s that the governor's mansion was dubbed "Uncle Tom's Cabin."

Stark sought and received Pendergast's support. The actions of Pendergast and his associates eventually prompted corruption investigations, and Stark turned overtly against Pendergast, who was later convicted of income tax evasion.

Stark had a fierce political rivalry with Harry S. Truman against whom he ran for the Senate in 1940. In what may have been a first in US history, Stark also ran for Vice-President in the same year at the Democratic National Convention in Chicago, for which he gained little interest. He then lost to Truman in the Senate Democratic primary when he and the prosecutor Maurice M. Milligan, who had toppled the Kansas City political machine, split the anti-Pendergast vote.

Stark served as Governor for six weeks beyond his normal term as a result of the controversial 1940 Missouri gubernatorial election, also called the "Great Governorship Steal", in which Pendergast-aligned Democrats attempted to overturn a narrow victory by Republican Forrest C. Donnell. Stark opposed these efforts and vetoed resolutions from the Missouri General Assembly that attempted to recount the election in a manner favorable to Democrats. The controversy was ultimately resolved by the Missouri Supreme Court in favor of Donnell, who was inaugurated six weeks late on February 26, 1941.

Although the loss to Truman in 1940 heralded the end of his political career, Stark spent the remainder of his working life managing the Stark Brothers Nurseries. Meanwhile, Stark influenced the political careers of Clarence Cannon and Stuart Symington. Stark died in Clayton, Missouri in 1972.

== Family life ==
Lloyd Stark was part of a family rather prominent in Missouri and was active with his brother Paul in the then family-owned business Stark Brothers' Nursery (the oldest nursery in America and at one time the largest in the world). The nursery had popularized the Golden Delicious apple.

Stark married Margaret Pearson Stickney of Baltimore in 1908. Together they had sons Lloyd Stickney and John Wingate Stark. Margaret died in 1930. Stark then married Katherine Lemoine Perkins in 1931. They had two daughters, Mary Murray Spottswood and Katherine Lemoine Stark.

Stark's cousin, Charles Stark Draper, was a prominent inventor. The uncle of Lloyd Stark and Charles Stark Draper, state representative, James O. Stark was a prominent supporter and adviser of presidential contender and Speaker of the House, Champ Clark (despite this connection, Clark's son Bennett, Missouri's other Senator, crucially supported Truman in 1940) - and the husband of the niece of Republican anti-slavery activist Elihu Washburne.

Stark's home at Louisiana from 1915 to 1940 was listed on the National Register of Historic Places in 1987 as the Gov. Lloyd Crow Stark House and Carriage House.

== See also ==
- List of members of the American Legion

== Bibliography ==
- McCullough, David (1992). Truman. New York: Simon & Schuster. ISBN 978-0-671-86920-5.

Party political offices
Preceded by Guy Brasfield Park	Democratic nominee for Governor of Missouri; 1936	Succeeded by Larry McDaniel
Political offices
Preceded by Guy Brasfield Park	Governor of Missouri; 1937–1941	Succeeded by Forrest C. Donnell
Preceded by [[[Roy Cochran (politician)|Roy Cochran]]	Chair of the National Governors Association; 1939–1940	Succeeded by William Henry Vanderbilt III
