= Thomas C. Hennings Jr. =

American politician

Thomas Hennings
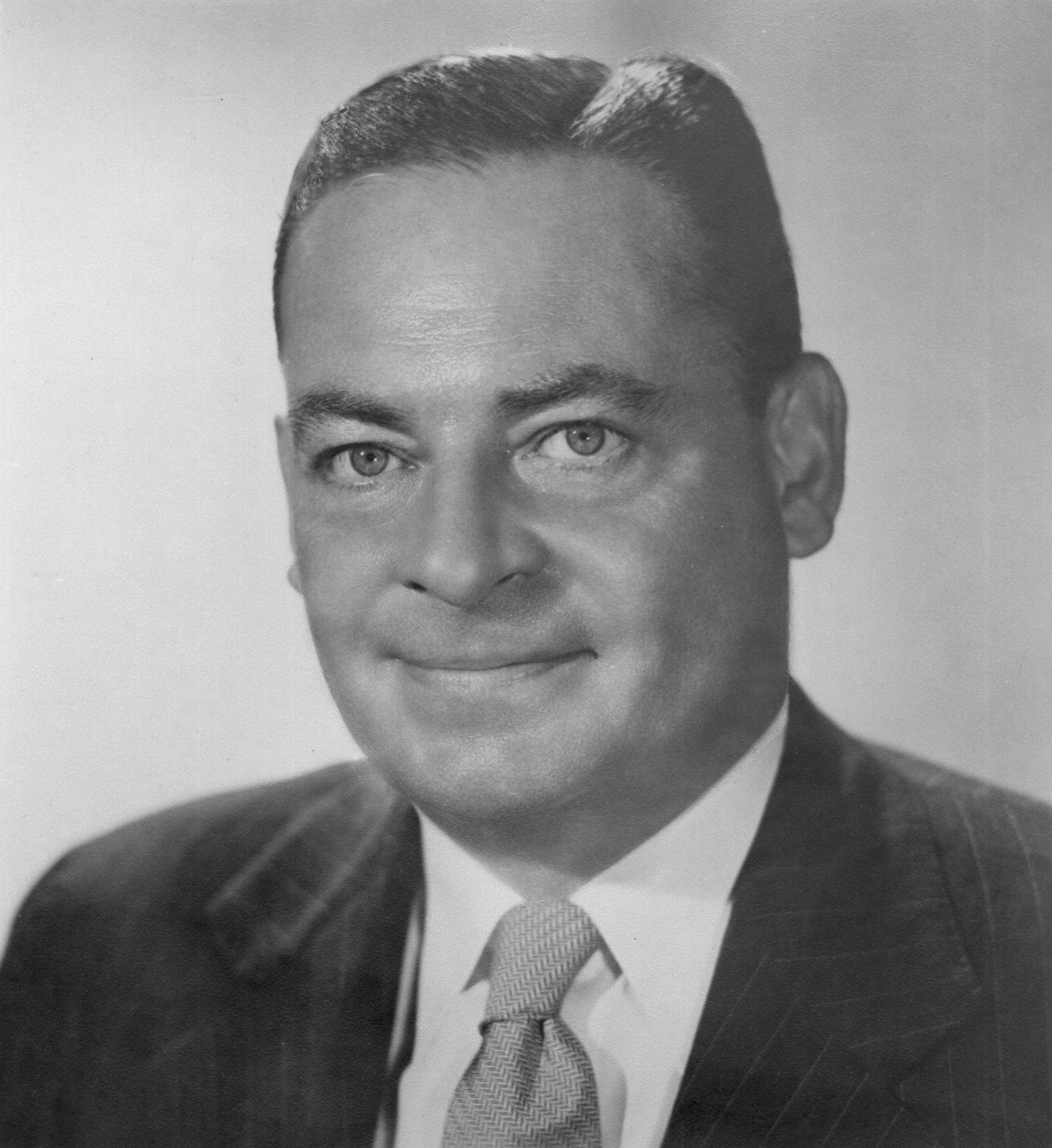
- Official portrait, 1952

Chair of the Senate Rules Committee
- In office January 3, 1957 – September 13, 1960
- Preceded by: Theodore F. Green
- Succeeded by: Mike Mansfield

Secretary of the Senate Democratic Caucus
- In office January 3, 1953 – September 13, 1960
- Leader: Lyndon B. Johnson
- Preceded by: Brien McMahon
- Succeeded by: George Smathers

United States Senator from Missouri
- In office January 3, 1951 – September 13, 1960
- Preceded by: Forrest C. Donnell
- Succeeded by: Edward V. Long

Member of the U.S. House of Representatives from Missouri's 11th district
- In office January 3, 1935 – December 31, 1940
- Preceded by: James Edward Ruffin
- Succeeded by: John B. Sullivan

Personal details
- Born: Thomas Carey Hennings Jr. June 25, 1903 St. Louis, Missouri, U.S.
- Died: September 13, 1960 (aged 57) Washington, D.C., U.S.
- Resting place: Arlington National Cemetery
- Party: Democratic
- Education: Cornell University (BA); Washington University (LLB)

Thomas Carey Hennings Jr. (June 25, 1903 – September 13, 1960) was an American political figure from Missouri. He was a Democratic member of the United States House of Representatives (from 1935 until 1940) and the United States Senate (from 1951 until 1960).

== Early life ==
Born into a wealthy family in St. Louis, Missouri to Judge Thomas Carey Hennings, his father was an influential member of the Jefferson Club, an organization dedicated to overthrowing the bossism of the city's Democratic Political Machine. Hennings Jr. attended Soldan High School, and displayed talents in athletics, going on to run track and field at Cornell University. After graduating from Cornell in 1924, he finished his education at the law school of Washington University in St. Louis in 1926. He was admitted to the bar in 1926 and commenced practice in St. Louis, and served as assistant circuit attorney for that city from 1929 to 1934. He served as a colonel on the Governor's staff from 1932 to 1936 and was a lecturer on criminal jurisprudence at the Benton College of Law in St. Louis from 1934 to 1938.

== Congressional career ==
=== House of Representatives ===
Hennings was elected to the Seventy-fourth, Seventy-fifth, and Seventy-sixth Congresses and served from January 3, 1935, to December 31, 1940. He was the first Democrat in 22 years to represent Missouri's 11th congressional district. Hennings enjoyed support from St. Louis' growing African American population. Hennings regularly hired African Americans to his offices in Washington D.C. and St. Louis. During the Second New Deal, he worked towards establishing an African American branch of the Civilian Conservation Corps at Poplar Bluff, Missouri. Within the New Deal's Federal Emergency Relief Act (FERA), Hennings advocated for a “Negro Federal Employment Office” with all black staff. Hennings also sponsored anti-lynching bills while in the House. His work secured him the endorsements of two of St. Louis' black newspapers, the Argus and the American and the city's NAACP chapter. Hennings resigned in 1940 to become a candidate for circuit attorney of St. Louis.

=== Time out of office ===
Hennings was circuit attorney from 1941 to 1944, taking leave of absence in September 1941 to volunteer for active duty in the United States Naval Reserve. Serving in the Pacific and Caribbean as a lieutenant commander for three years, he was discharged from active duty due to physical disability incurred in the line of duty. After which, he resumed the practice of law in the St. Louis firm of Green, Hennings, Henry and Evans.

=== Senate ===
He was elected as a Democrat to the U.S. Senate in 1950 over Republican incumbent and former governor Forrest Donnell in the only senate election that year when Democrats took a seat from Republicans, was reelected in 1956, and served from January 3, 1951, until his death from abdominal cancer in Washington, D.C. in 1960. Hennings did not sign the 1956 Southern Manifesto, and voted in favor of the Civil Rights Acts of 1957 and 1960. While in the Senate, he was chairman of the Committee on Rules and Administration (Eighty-fifth and Eighty-sixth Congresses), and served on the United States Senate Subcommittee on Juvenile Delinquency while it investigated comic books.

== Personal life ==
Hennings died on September 13, 1960, and is buried in Arlington National Cemetery.

Hennings' daughter Karla Ann was briefly married to White House Counsel John Dean who would later be deeply involved in events leading up to the Watergate burglaries and the subsequent cover-up.

== See also ==
- List of members of the United States Congress who died in office (1950–1999)

U.S. House of Representatives
Preceded by James Edward Ruffin	Member of the U.S. House of Representatives from Missouri's 11th congressional district 1935–1940	Succeeded by John B. Sullivan
Party political offices
Preceded by Roy McKittrick	Democratic nominee for U.S. Senator from Missouri (Class 3); 1950, 1956	Succeeded by Edward V. Long
Preceded by Brien McMahon	Secretary of the Senate Democratic Caucus; 1953–1960	Succeeded by George Smathers
U.S. Senate
Preceded by Forrest C. Donnell	U.S. Senator (Class 3) from Missouri; 1951–1960; Served alongside: James P. Kem, Stuart Symington	Succeeded by Edward V. Long
Preceded by Theodore F. Green	Chair of the Senate Rules Committee; 1957–1960	Succeeded by Mike Mansfield
