= Frederick Kreismann =

American politician

Frederick H. Kreismann
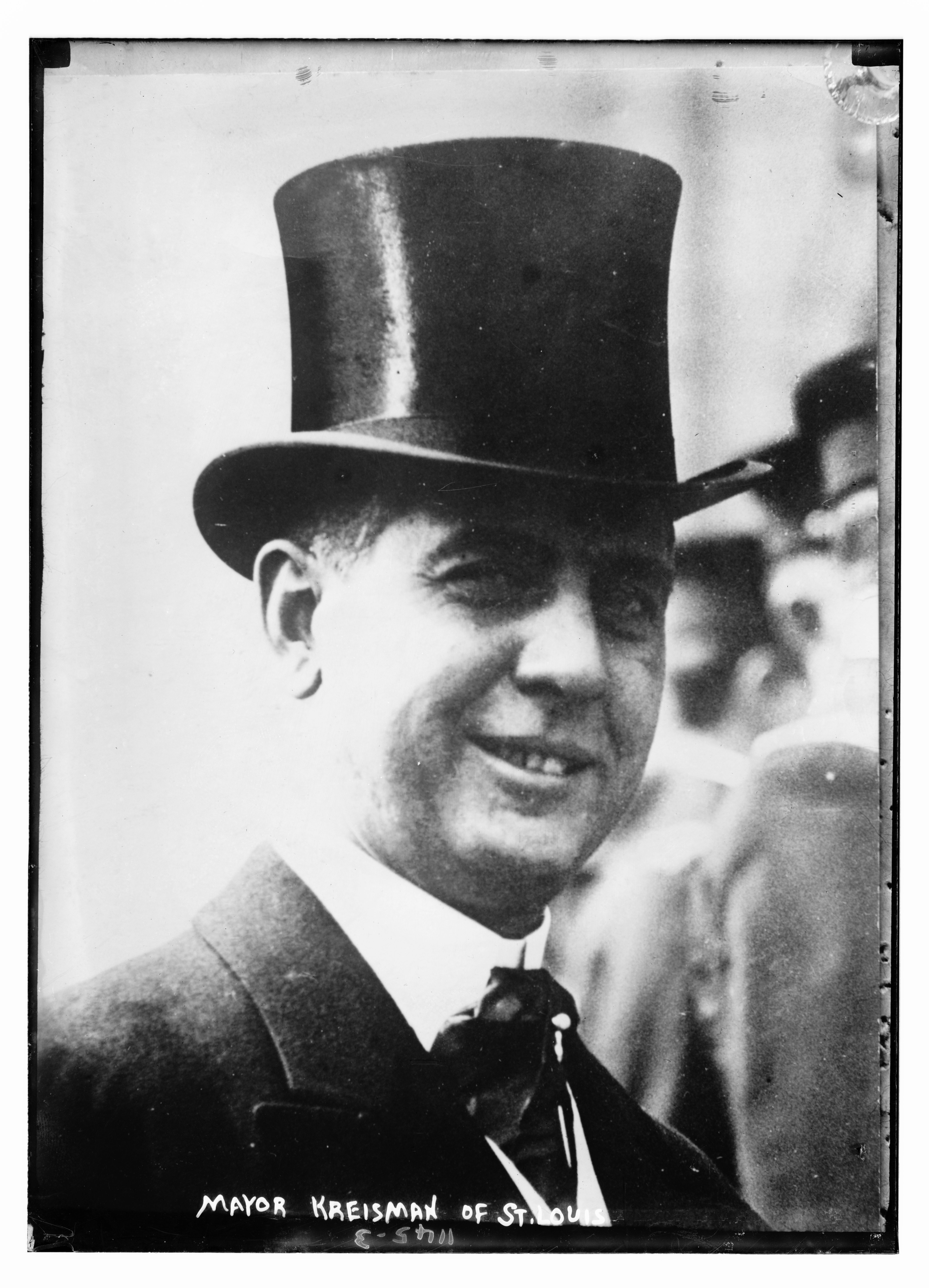

31st Mayor of St. Louis
- In office April 13, 1909 – April 13, 1913
- Preceded by: Rolla Wells
- Succeeded by: Henry Kiel

Personal details
- Born: August 7, 1869 Quincy, Illinois
- Died: November 1, 1944 (aged 75) Webster Groves, Missouri
- Party: Republican

Frederick H. Kreismann (August 7, 1869 – November 1, 1944) was an American politician who served as mayor of St. Louis, Missouri from 1909 to 1913. He was a Republican.

== Education and background ==
Kreismann was born in Quincy, Illinois and attended public schools in Quincy and St. Louis. He worked in civil engineering and surveying, and in 1890, he entered the insurance business, which became his career. In 1902 he married Pauline Whiteman and they had two children.

Kreismann was interested in politics at an early age. In 1905 he ran for the position of City Clerk and was elected. He held this position until he resigned to run for mayor in 1909.

== Term as mayor ==
Kreismann became the thirty-first Mayor of St. Louis in 1909. The city's population was growing rapidly at this time, rising from 575,238 in 1900 to 687,029 in 1910. St. Louis remained the fourth largest city in the United States. Much of Kriesmann's term as mayor was dedicated to policies that would manage this growth. He helped establish a Municipal Testing Laboratory, which went into operation in 1912. An ordinance that same year also gave the city's health commissioner the authority regulate the storage and transportation of food.

Two important public buildings were completed during Kreismann's administration. Construction on the Municipal Courts Buildings began in August 1909 and was completed in 1911 at a cost of $967,000. The Central Library Building of the City's Public Library System was completed and opened on January 6, 1912.

Another public works project, the construction of the McArthur Free Bridge, crossing the Mississippi River north of Downtown became a problem for Kriesmann because the $3,500,000 bond issue that had been authorized to fund the bridge did not provide sufficient funds for its completion. The bridge was eventually completed after another bond issue was approved during Mayor Henry Kiel's administration.

== Later life ==
After his term as mayor ended, Kreismann returned to the insurance business. He retired in 1939. He died in Webster Groves, Missouri on November 1, 1944, and was buried in Bellefontaine Cemetery.
