= Forrest C. Donnell =

American politician (1884–1980)

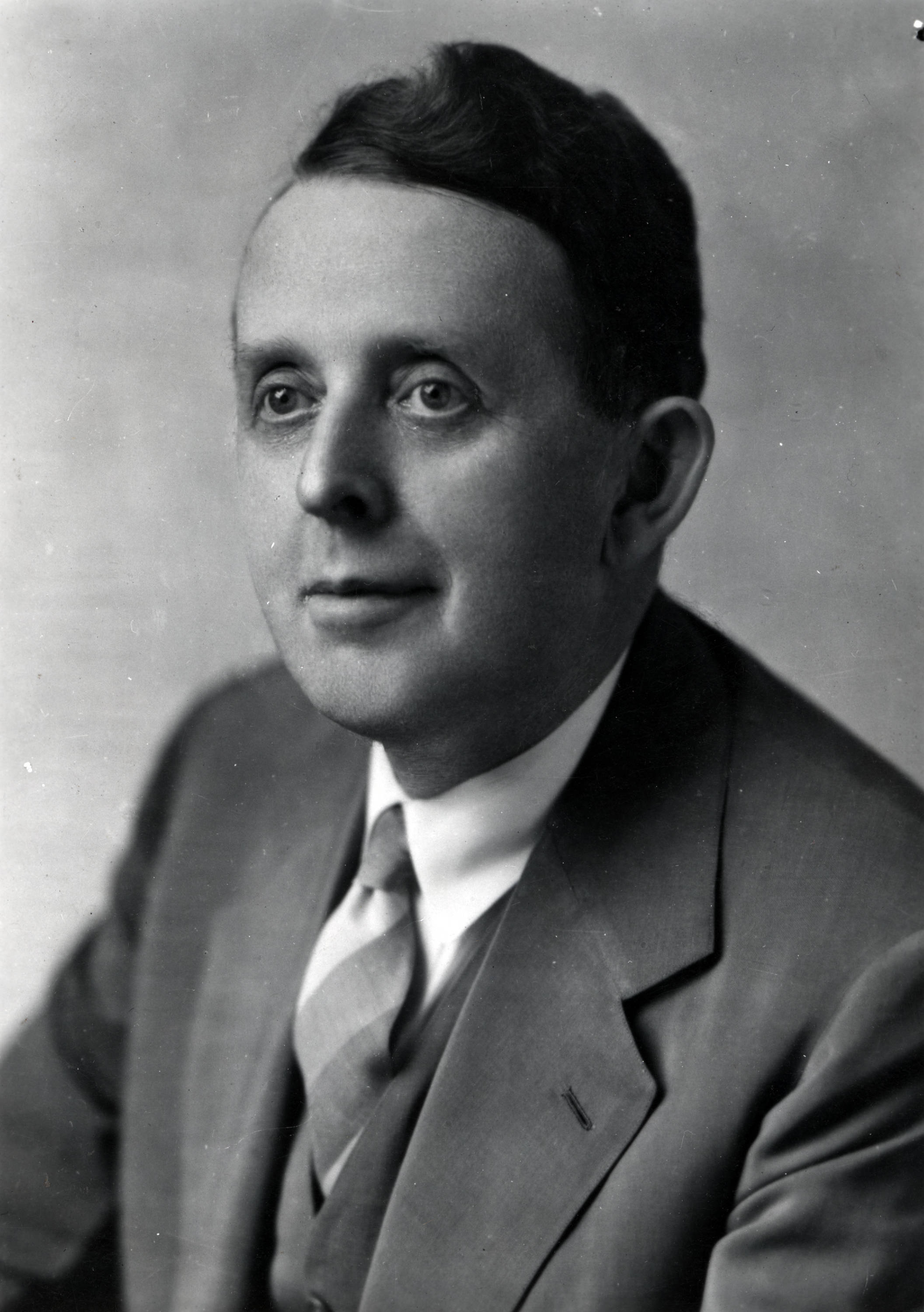
- Official portrait as governor, c. 1941

United States Senator from Missouri
- In office January 3, 1945 – January 3, 1951
- Preceded by: Joel B. Clark
- Succeeded by: Thomas C. Hennings, Jr.

40th Governor of Missouri
- In office February 26, 1941 – January 8, 1945
- Lieutenant: Frank Gaines Harris
- Preceded by: Lloyd C. Stark
- Succeeded by: Phil M. Donnelly

Personal details
- Born: August 20, 1884 Quitman, Missouri, U.S.
- Died: March 3, 1980 (aged 95) St. Louis, Missouri, U.S.
- Resting place: Bellefontaine Cemetery
- Party: Republican

Forrest C. Donnell (August 20, 1884 – March 3, 1980) was an American attorney and politician who served as a United States senator and the 40th governor of Missouri.

== Early life ==
Donnell was born in Quitman, Missouri. Donnell graduated from Maryville High School in 1900, where his father was once mayor; the Donnells lived in the home that had once belonged to Albert Morehouse, who also served as governor.

At the University of Missouri he was a member of Kappa Sigma and Phi Delta Phi fraternities. He was also elected as a member of the Phi Beta Kappa, Theta Kappa Nu and QEBH societies. He was valedictorian of the 1904 class and received a law degree in 1907.

In 1907 he moved to St. Louis, Missouri. In October 1911 he and future Senator Selden P. Spencer founded the law firm Spencer & Donnell. Donnell married Hilda Hays in 1913. They had two children, Ruth and John Lanier. In 1917 he was president of the Association of Young Republicans of Missouri; in 1918-1920, a member of the executive committee of the Republican State Committee of Missouri; and in 1919, a president of the 28th Ward Republican Club of St. Louis.

He was the city attorney for Webster Groves, Missouri, a suburb southwest of St. Louis City.

== Governor ==
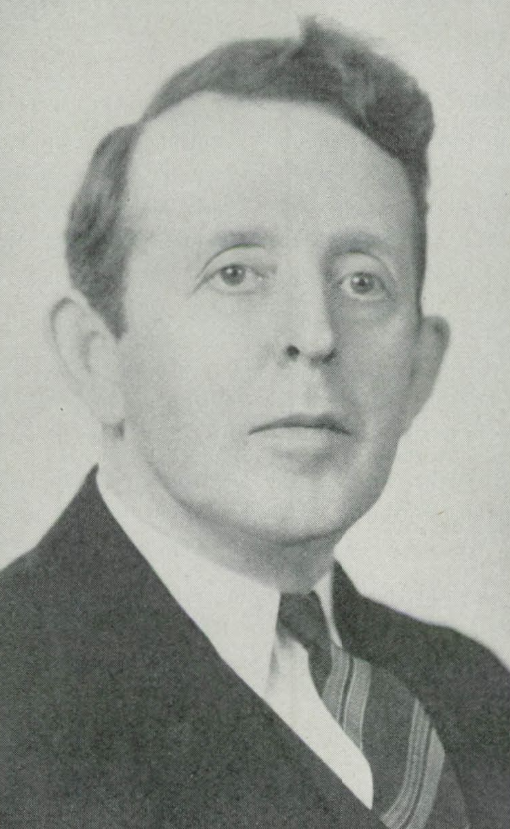
Donnell as governor

Donnell was elected governor of Missouri in 1940 and served one term from 1941 to 1945.

He was the first Republican governor of Missouri after the collapse of Tom Pendergast's Kansas City political machine, and the only major Republican elected statewide in the 1940 election; Democrats delayed seating him for six weeks until being forced to do so by the Missouri Supreme Court in what was called the "Great Governorship Steal".

Donnell had defeated St. Louis politician Lawrence "Larry" McDaniel by 3,613 votes out of nearly 2 million cast, thanks largely to votes from rural areas.

Donnell's predecessor Lloyd C. Stark had wrested control of federal appointments in the state from the Pendergast machine in 1936. Consequently, there was unease about a Republican taking over the appointments.

Within hours of the election, several members of the Democratic party met at the DeSoto Hotel in St. Louis to plan a response. Among those attending were Senator Bennett Champ Clark, St. Louis Mayor Bernard F. Dickmann, Democratic Party Chairman Robert Hannegan, Attorney General Roy McKittrick and state Democratic Chairman C. Marion Hulen.

Their strategy was to charge that Republican votes were fraudulently bought. They sought to use a provision of the Missouri Constitution that allowed the speaker of the house to "count – tabulate – the votes and proclaim to the general public who won".

Donnell was refused to be seated while the speaker investigated the votes. Governor Stark urged that he be seated. The Missouri Supreme Court ultimately seated him.

Donnell was a Mason with Tuscan Lodge #360 in St. Louis, serving as Worshipful Master in 1915 and was elected Grand Master of Missouri A.F. & A.M.(1942-1943) during his term as governor. Ironically, Democrat Harry S. Truman was to imply that Donnell helped Truman win the 1940 Senate election because of their Masonic bond.

Truman said:

I had a Catholic friend in St. Louis by the name of James E. Wade. He attended a meeting [where] Davis made his usual charges. Forrest Donnell, who afterwards became [Republican] Governor and Senator, was speaking from the same platform. Donnell was just behind me in the Grand Lodge line and would be Grand Master in a year or two.

So Jim Wade went up to him ... and asked him if I could be the low sort of fellow that Davis charged and still be Grand Master of Masons of Missouri. Mr. Donnell said: 'No, Jim, he could not.' That ruined Mr. Davis—I won by 276,000 votes."

Donnell's ambitious plans as governor were largely thwarted, despite the Republican party gaining control of the house of representatives and an equal share in the senate in 1942.

== Senator ==
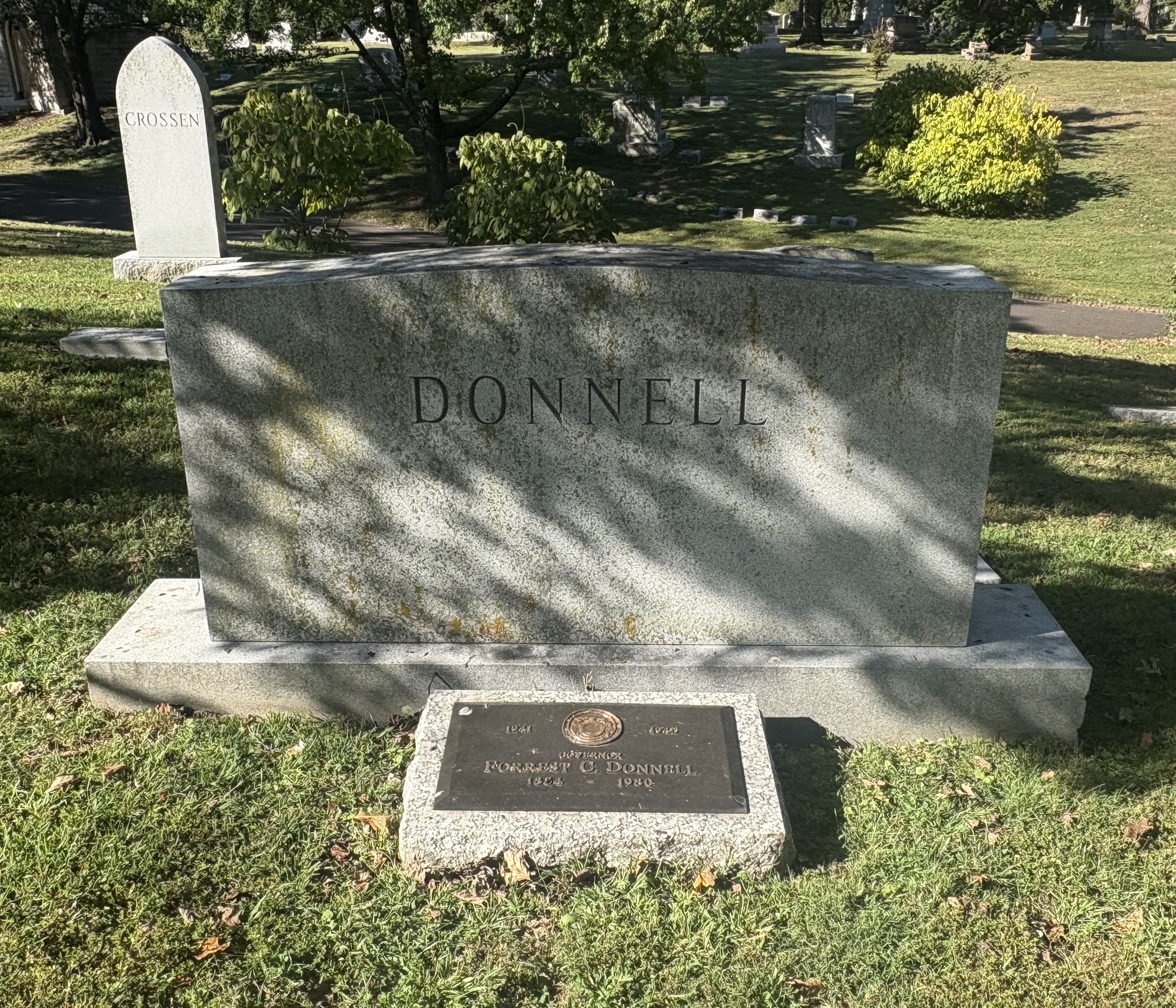
Donnell's grave at Bellefontaine Cemetery

Donnell was elected to the U.S. Senate in 1944. In that race, he defeated state Attorney General Roy McKittrick by 1,988 votes out of nearly 1.56 million cast . McKittrick had unseated incumbent U.S. Senator Bennett Champ Clark in the Democratic primary. He served from 1945 to 1951. As senator, Donnell supported the Taft-Hartley Act, other antilabor measures, and lower income taxes. He opposed an excess-profits tax and most foreign aid. He lost to former U.S. Representative Thomas C. Hennings Jr. by 53.6% to 46.4% in the 1950.

He returned to practicing law and retired in 1956. Donnell served as president of the University of Missouri Alumni Association and as a trustee of the State Historical Society of Missouri. He died in 1980 at the age of 95 in St. Louis. He is buried in Bellefontaine Cemetery.

Party political offices
Preceded by Jesse W. Barrett	Republican nominee for Governor of Missouri; 1940	Succeeded by Jean Paul Bradshaw
Preceded by Henry S. Caulfield	Republican nominee for U.S. Senator from Missouri (Class 3); 1944, 1950	Succeeded by Herbert Douglas
Political offices
Preceded by Lloyd C. Stark	Governor of Missouri; 1941–1945	Succeeded by Phil M. Donnelly
U.S. Senate
Preceded by Joel Bennett Clark	U.S. senator (Class 3) from Missouri; 1945–1951; Served alongside: Harry S. Truman, Frank P. Briggs, James P. Kem	Succeeded by Thomas C. Hennings, Jr.
