= 1932 Missouri gubernatorial election =

- November 8, 1932
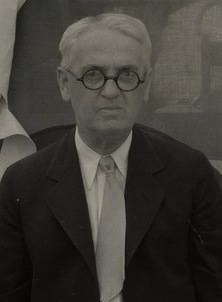

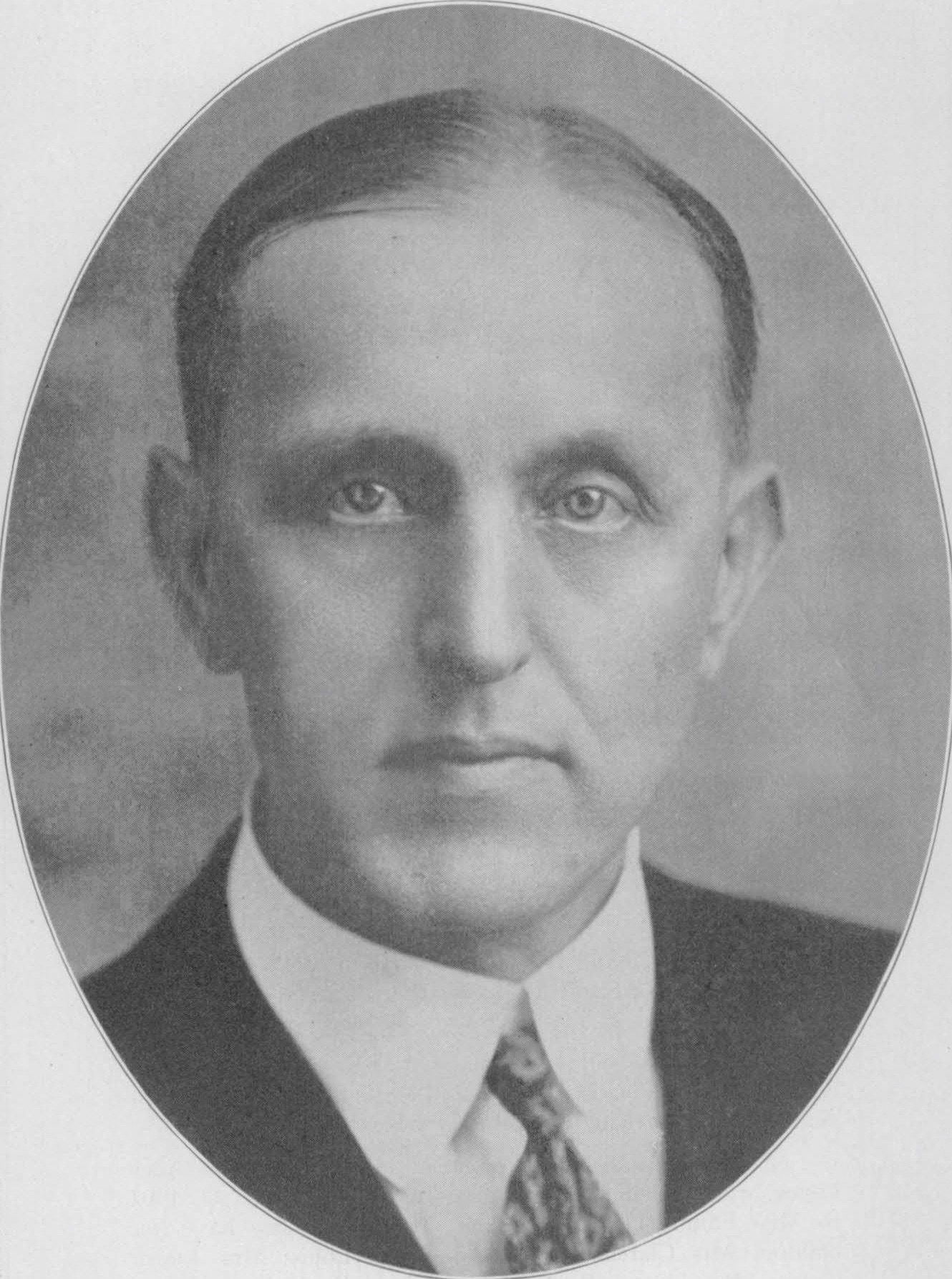
| Nominee | Guy Brasfield Park | Edward Henry Winter |
| Party | Democratic | Republican |
| Popular vote | 968,551 | 629,428 |
| Percentage | 60.17% | 39.10% |
- County results Park: 40–50% 50–60% 60–70% 70–80% 80–90% Winter: 40–50% 50–60% 60–70%
Governor before election
Henry S. Caulfield
Republican
Elected Governor
Guy Brasfield Park
Democratic

The 1932 Missouri gubernatorial election was held on November 8, 1932, and resulted in a victory for the Democratic nominee, judge Guy Brasfield Park, over the Republican candidate, Lt. Governor Edward Henry Winter, and several other candidates representing minor parties. Park was nominated after the original nominee Francis M. Wilson died. Winter had defeated Secretary of State Charles U. Becker for his party's nomination.

== Results ==
1932 gubernatorial election, Missouri
| Party | Candidate | Votes | % | ±% |
|---|---|---|---|---|
| Democratic | Guy Brasfield Park | 968,551 | 60.17 | +12.00 |
| Republican | Edward Henry Winter | 629,428 | 39.10 | −12.53 |
| Socialist | Louis Martin Wolf | 10,921 | 0.68 | +0.52 |
| Communist | Owen W. Penney | 547 | 0.03 | +0.03 |
| Socialist Labor | William Wesley Cox | 347 | 0.02 | ±0.00 |
| Majority | | 339,123 | 21.07 | +17.61 |
| Turnout | | 1,609,794 | 44.35 | −0.28 |
| Democratic gain from Republican | | Swing | | |
