= 1938 United States Senate election in Missouri =

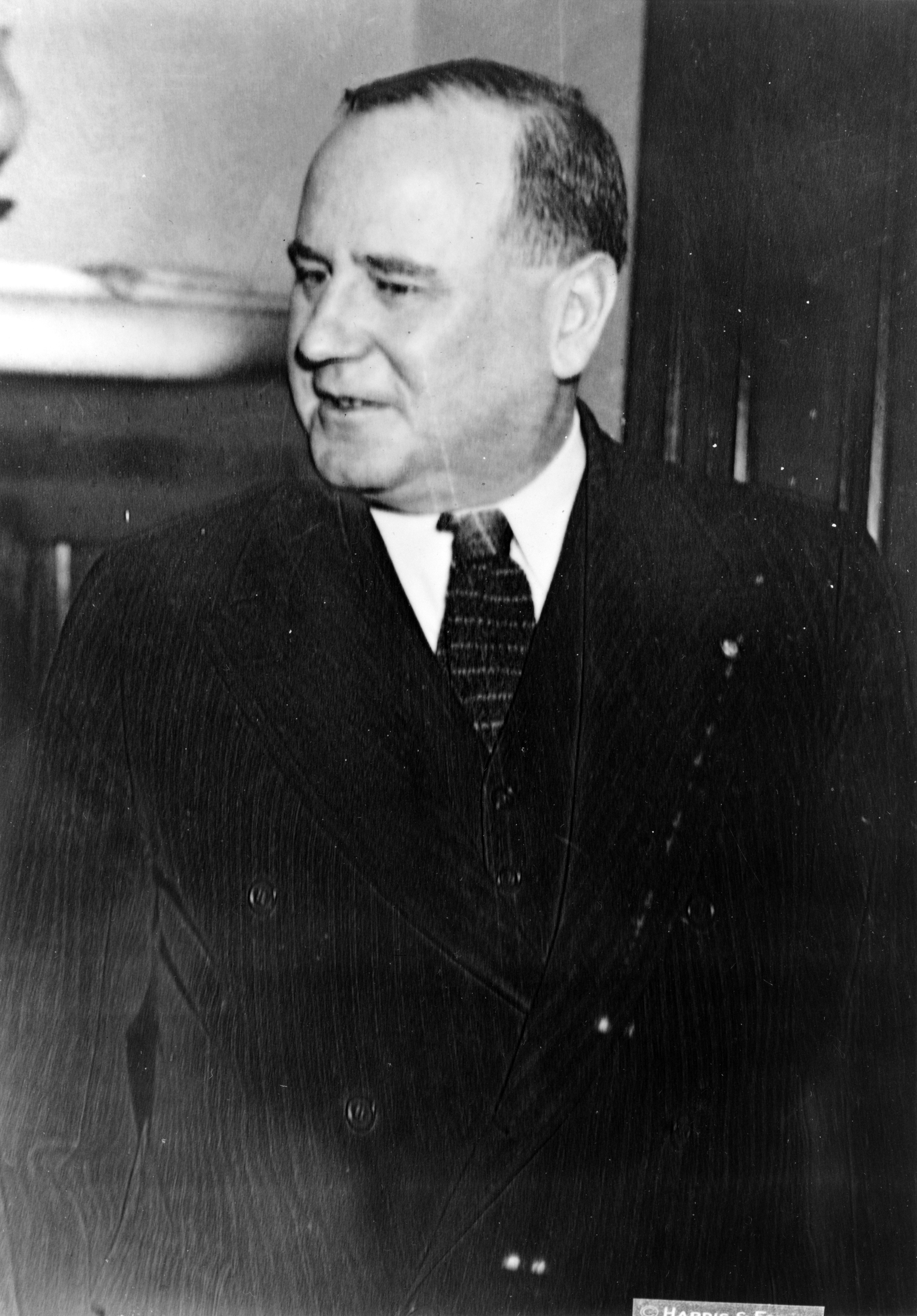

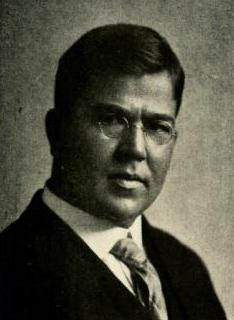
Nominee	Bennett Champ Clark	Henry S. Caulfield
Party	Democratic	Republican
Popular vote	757,587	488,687
Percentage	60.69%	39.15%
- County results Clark: 50–60% 60–70% 70–80% 80–90% Caulfield: 50–60% 60–70% 70–80%
U.S. senator before election
Bennett Champ Clark
Democratic
Elected U.S. senator
Bennett Champ Clark
Democratic

The 1938 United States Senate election in Missouri took place on November 8, 1938 in Missouri. The incumbent Democratic Senator, Bennett Champ Clark, was re-elected with 60.69% of the vote. He defeated Republican candidate and former Governor of Missouri Henry S. Caulfield.

== Democratic primary ==
=== Candidates ===
- Bennett Champ Clark, incumbent Senator since 1933
- Joseph T. Davis, lawyer
- Willis H. Meredith, former State Representative for Butler County and Speaker of the Missouri House of Representatives
- Robert I. Young, farmer

=== Results ===
Democratic primary August 2, 1938
Party	Candidate	Votes	%
Democratic	Bennett Champ Clark (incumbent)	574,526	78.81
Democratic	Joseph T. Davis	92,946	12.75
Democratic	Willis H. Meredith	35,543	4.88
Democratic	Robert I. Young	26,029	3.57
Total votes		729,044	100

== Republican primary ==
=== Candidates ===
- Henry S. Caulfield, former Governor of Missouri
- Ray E. White, real estate dealer

=== Results ===
Republican primary August 2, 1938
Party	Candidate	Votes	%
Republican	Henry S. Caulfield	168,312	85.97
Republican	Ray E. White	27,470	14.03
Total votes		195,782	100

== General election ==
=== Candidates ===
- Henry S. Caulfield, former Governor of Missouri (Republican)
- Bennett Champ Clark, incumbent Senator since 1933 (Democratic)
- J. G. Hodges, nominee for U.S. Senate in 1932 (Socialist)
- Karl L. Oberhue (Socialist Labor)

=== Results ===
1938 United States Senate election in Missouri
Party	Candidate	Votes	%	±%
Democratic	Bennett Champ Clark (incumbent)	757,587	60.69%	−2.57
Republican	Henry S. Caulfield	488,687	39.15%	+3.38
Socialist	J. G. Hodges	1,712	0.14%	−0.57
Socialist Labor	Karl L. Oberhue	292	0.02%	−0.01
Majority		268,900	21.54%	
Turnout		1,248,278		
Democratic hold		Swing		
