= 1932 United States Senate election in Missouri =

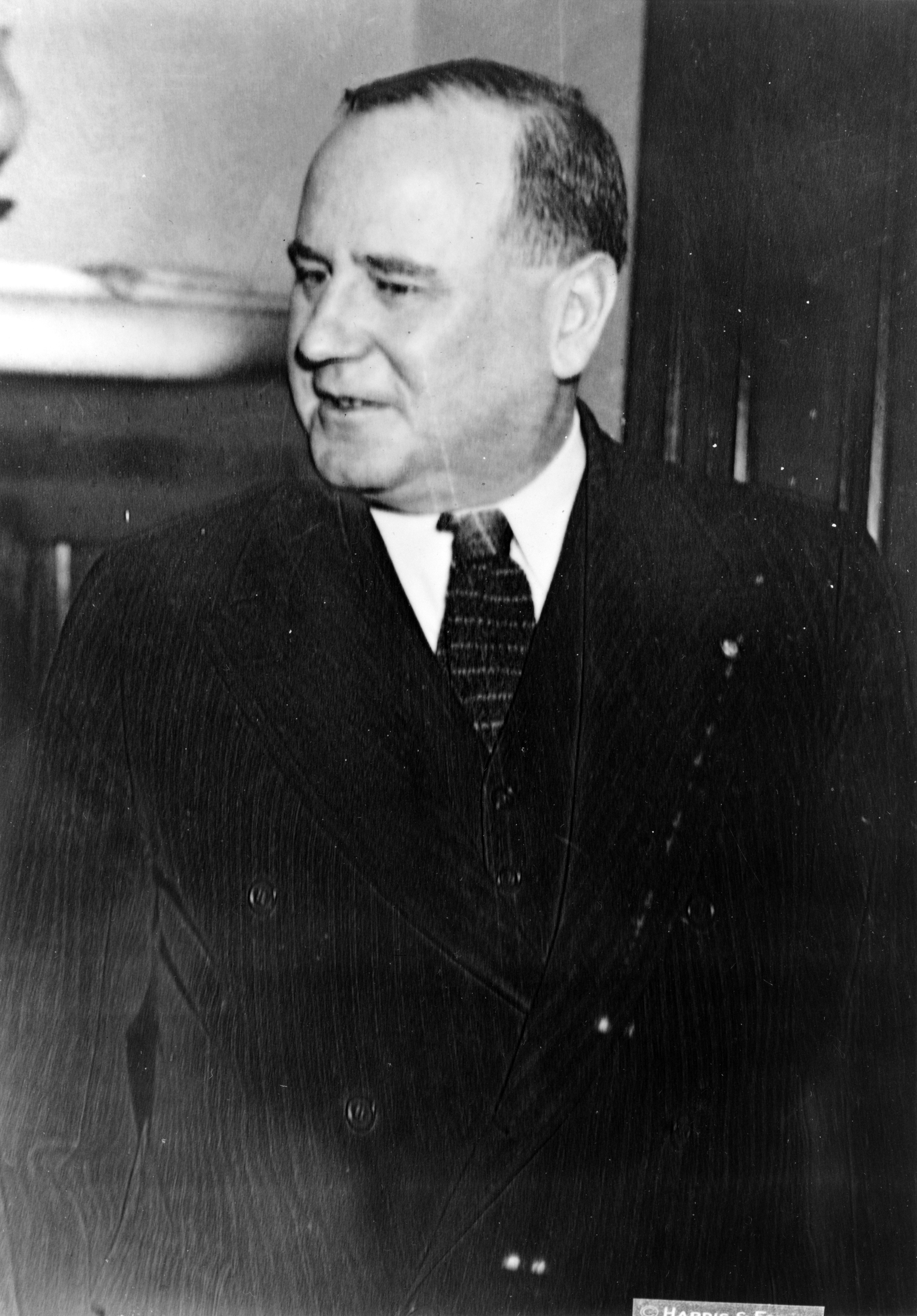

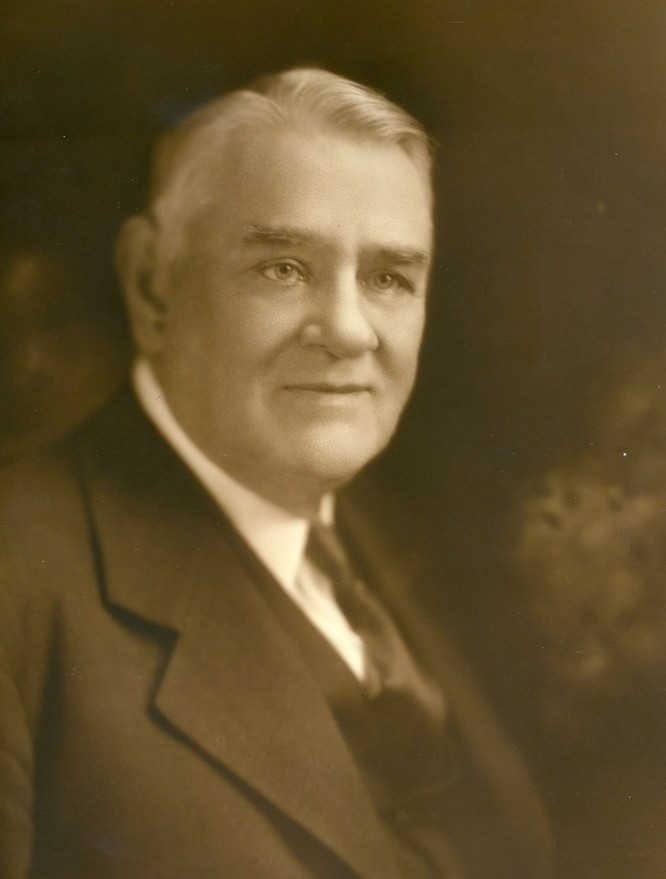
Nominee	Bennett Champ Clark	Henry Kiel
Party	Democratic	Republican
Popular vote	1,017,046	575,174
Percentage	63.26%	35.77%
- County results Clark: 50–60% 60–70% 70–80% 80–90% Kiel: 50–60% 60–70%
U.S. senator before election
Harry B. Hawes
Democratic
Elected U.S. senator
Bennett Champ Clark
Democratic

The 1932 United States Senate election in Missouri took place on November 8, 1932, in Missouri. Incumbent Democratic Senator Harry B. Hawes did not seek re-election, and Democratic candidate Bennett Champ Clark was elected with 63.26% of the vote over former Mayor of St. Louis Henry Kiel. Clark slightly underperformed Franklin D. Roosevelt, who won 63.69% of the vote in the presidential election. He also notably carried the exact same counties Roosevelt carried in the Presidential Election

Hawes resigned his seat on February 3, 1933, and Clark was appointed to the vacancy before his full term began.

== Democratic primary ==
=== Candidates ===
- James W. Byrnes, president of the Missouri Association Against Prohibition
- Bennett Champ Clark, lawyer, former Parliamentarian of the House of Representatives, and son of Champ Clark
- Charles M. Hay, attorney and leading prohibitionist
- Charles M. Howell, insurance lobbyist
- Robert H. Merryman, lawyer

=== Results ===
Democratic primary August 2, 1932
Party	Candidate	Votes	%
Democratic	Bennett Champ Clark	268,667	43.99
Democratic	Charles M. Howell	173,266	28.37
Democratic	Charles M. Hay	151,188	24.76
Democratic	James W. Byrnes	11,776	1.93
Democratic	Robert H. Merryman	5,819	0.95
Total votes		610,716	100

== Republican primary ==
=== Candidates ===
- Pearl Abernathy, real estate dealer
- B. F. Beazell, former Bureau of Prohibition agent
- Henry Kiel, president of the St. Louis Board of Police Commissioners and former Mayor of St. Louis
- Robert J. Kratky, attorney
- Blodgett Priest, attorney
- Dewey Jackson Short, former U.S. Representative from Springfield

=== Results ===
Republican primary August 2, 1932
Party	Candidate	Votes	%
Republican	Henry Kiel	172,447	50.42
Republican	Dewey Jackson Short	71,936	21.03
Republican	Robert J. Kratky	38,664	11.30
Republican	B. F. Beazell	34,705	10.15
Republican	Blodgett Priest	12,533	3.66
Republican	Pearl Abernathy	11,753	3.44
Total votes		342,038	100

== Other primaries ==
=== Communist ===
The Communist Party nominated Julius Pollack.

=== Prohibition ===
Prohibition primary August 2, 1932
Party	Candidate	Votes	%
Prohibition	Herman P. Faris	21	100
Total votes		21	100

=== Socialist ===
Socialist primary August 2, 1932
Party	Candidate	Votes	%
Socialist	J. G. Hodges	535	100
Total votes		535	100

=== Socialist Labour ===
Socialist Labour primary August 2, 1932
Party	Candidate	Votes	%
Socialist Labor	Karl L. Oberhue	38	100
Total votes		38	100

== General election ==
1932 United States Senate election in Missouri
Party	Candidate	Votes	%	±%
Democratic	Bennett Champ Clark (incumbent)	1,017,046	63.26%	+11.96
Republican	Henry Kiel	575,174	35.77%	−11.94
Socialist	J. G. Hodges	11,441	0.71%	+0.53
Prohibition	Herman P. Faris	3,147	0.20%	−0.56
Communist	Julius Pollack	533	0.03%	+0.03
Socialist Labor	Karl L. Oberhue	417	0.03%	−0.02
Majority		441,872	27.49%	
Turnout		1,607,758		
Democratic hold		Swing		
