= 1936 Missouri gubernatorial election =

- November 3, 1936
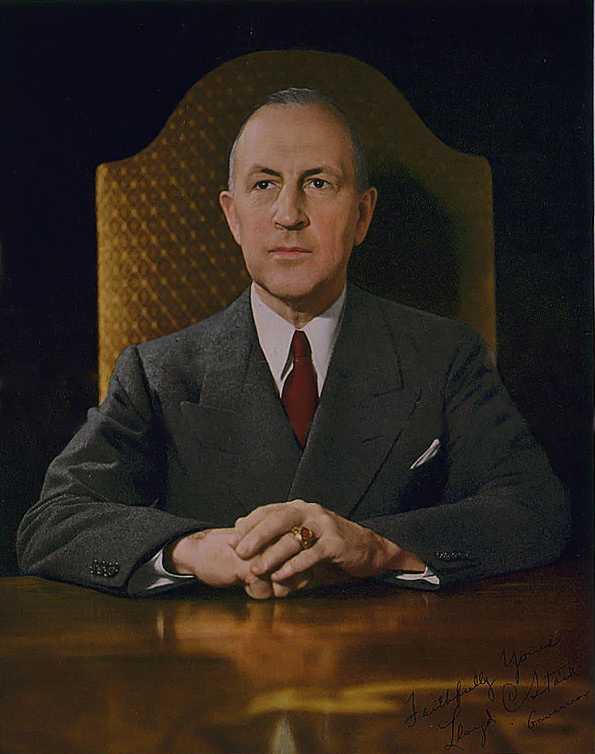

Nominee	Lloyd C. Stark	Jesse W. Barrett
Party	Democratic	Republican
Popular vote	1,037,133	772,934
Percentage	57.06%	42.53%
- County results Stark: 40–50% 50–60% 60–70% 70–80% 80–90% Barrett: 50–60% 60–70% 70–80%
Governor before election
Guy Brasfield Park
Democratic
Elected Governor
Lloyd C. Stark
Democratic

The 1936 Missouri gubernatorial election was held on November 3, 1936, and resulted in a victory for the Democratic nominee, Lloyd C. Stark, over the Republican nominee, former Missouri Attorney General Jesse W. Barrett, and several other candidates representing minor parties.

== Results ==
1936 gubernatorial election, Missouri
Party	Candidate	Votes	%	±%
Democratic	Lloyd C. Stark	1,037,133	57.06	−3.11
Republican	Jesse W. Barrett	772,934	42.53	+3.43
Nonpartisan	Otto C. Botz	4,082	0.23	+0.23
Socialist	George E. Duemler	2,807	0.15	−0.53
Communist	Frank A. Williams	345	0.02	−0.01
Socialist Labor	William Wesley Cox	295	0.02	±0.00
Majority		264,199	14.54	−6.53
Turnout		1,817,596	50.08	+5.73
Democratic hold		Swing		
