= Henry Kiel =

32nd Mayor of St. Louis (1871–1942)

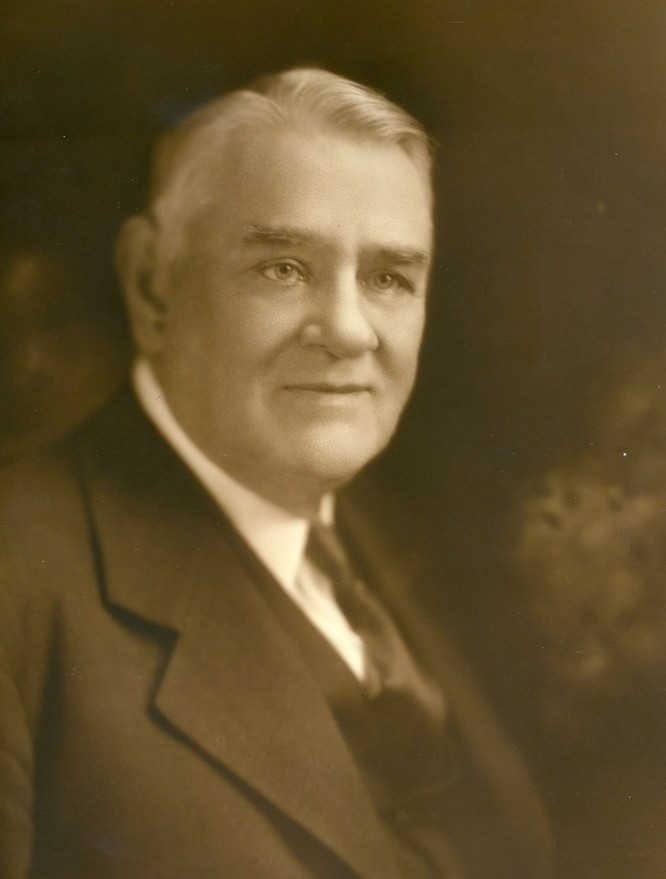

32nd Mayor of St. Louis
- In office April 12, 1913 – April 21, 1925
- Preceded by: Frederick Kreismann
- Succeeded by: Victor J. Miller

Personal details
- Born: February 21, 1871
- Died: November 26, 1942 (aged 71)
- Party: Republican
- Spouse: Irene H. Moonan

Henry W. Kiel (February 21, 1871 – November 26, 1942) was the 32nd Mayor of St. Louis, serving from 1913 to 1925.

== Early life ==
Henry W. Kiel's father was Henry F. Kiel, a well known contractor, who died in 1908. Henry F. Kiel also served as a private in the Civil War. Henry W. Kiel's mother was Mrs. Minnie C. Kiel, who died in 1879.

Kiel grew up in St. Louis and attended St. Louis Public Schools and the Smith Academy in Missouri. He studied architecture for a year after completing his academic studies. Kiel had a knack for mechanical structure and had an apprenticeship to the bricklayer's trade, under the direction of his father.

== Career ==
Kiel's family worked in the construction industry and his father wished for Henry to follow in his footsteps. Having served as vice president until his father's death, Henry W. became president of the Kiel & Daues Bricklaying & Contracting Company. Kiel had a role in constructing a number of prominent public and private buildings in St. Louis, including the Opera House, now known as the Stifel Theatre, and the Municipal Auditorium, which was later renamed in his honor as Kiel Auditorium, and its replacement named the Kiel Center before the corporate-sponsor era naming of stadiums and it became Savvis Center, and now known as Enterprise Center.

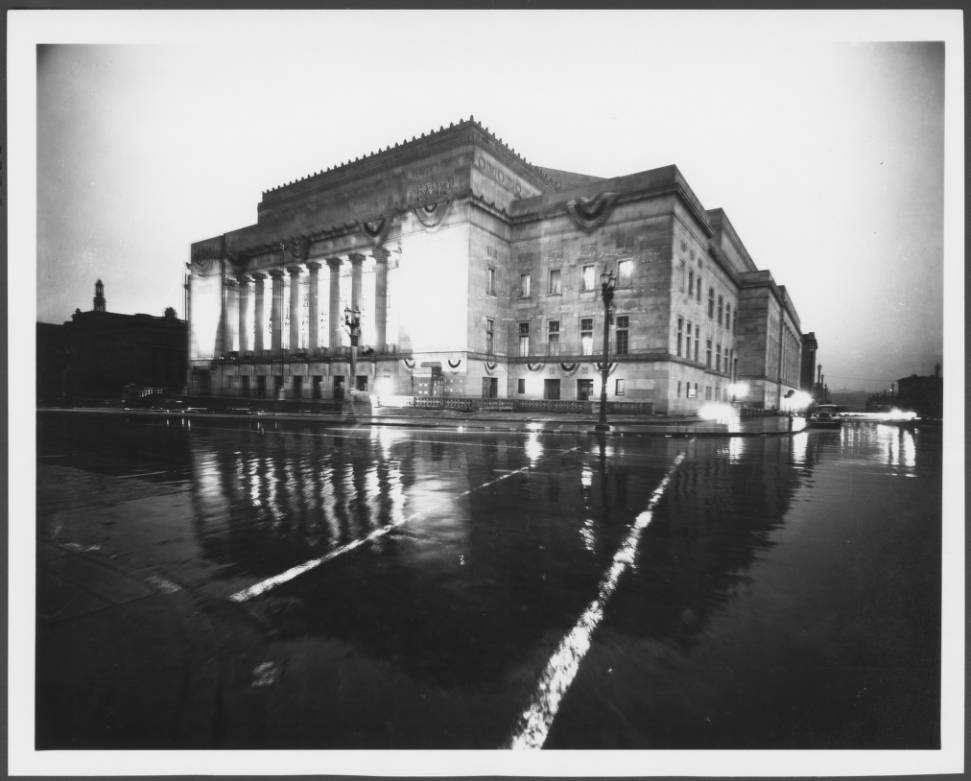
Exterior of the Municipal Auditorium and Community Center at night, also known as Kiel Auditorium.

Kiel was secretary of the Master Bricklayers Benevolent and Protective Association, an association of master bricklayers. He held that office from 1897 until at least 1909.

== Politics ==
Kiel was active in Republican party politics, serving as committeeman and also serving one year as Chairman of the Republican City Commission. Kiel was a member of the republican city committee from the thirteenth ward and treasurer of that organization. He was elected as a presidential elector at large for the republican ticket in Missouri in 1908 and was selected to deliver the electoral vote to the president of the United States senate.

In 1913, Kiel was elected Mayor by a very narrow margin over the Democratic candidate, Dr. John Simon. He was re-elected in 1917 and 1921, becoming the first mayor to serve three four-year terms. Mayor Kiel was a strong proponent of the City Charter adopted by the voters in 1914, which remains in effect as of 2023. The City's first zoning laws were enacted during Kiel's term.

Kiel also supported a number of public works projects in the City, and one of his actions was passage of an $87 million bond issue in 1923. Construction on many projects included in the bond issue began near the end of his term, but were not completed until after he left office.

After his last term as Mayor, Kiel continued to work in the construction industry and remained active in public affairs, later serving as President of the St. Louis Police Board. He ran unsuccessfully for the United States Senate in 1932.

== Personal life ==
Kiel married Irene H. Moonan on September 1, 1892. They had four children. Kiel died on November 26, 1942, and is buried in a mausoleum at Oak Grove Cemetery in St. Louis.

Party political offices
Preceded by George Howard Williams	Republican nominee for U.S. Senator from Missouri (Class 3); 1932	Succeeded by Henry S. Caulfield
Preceded by Frederick Kreismann	Mayor of St. Louis; 1913–1925	Succeeded by Victor J. Miller
