= Ray Mabee =

American politician, lawyer, and U.S. Army veteran

Charles Ray Mabee (February 16, 1901 - October 14, 1965) was an American Republican politician, lawyer, and U.S. Army veteran who has served in the Missouri General Assembly in the Missouri Senate being first elected to the senate in 1934. Commonly known as Ray Mabee, he had served as the Prosecuting Attorney of Putnam County, Missouri, and as city attorney for Unionville, Missouri. Mabee was also the Republican Party nominee for Missouri Attorney General in 1940.

Born in Appanoose County, Iowa, he was educated at rural schools in Iowa, public schools in Unionville, Northeast Missouri State Teachers College, the University of Colorado, and the University of Missouri. In the U.S. Army, he served in the Judge-Advocate General's Department, reaching the rank of major.

Party political offices
Preceded by J. Grant Frye	Republican nominee for Missouri Attorney General; 1940	Succeeded by George H. Miller
