= Guy Brasfield Park =

American governor of Missouri (1872–1946)

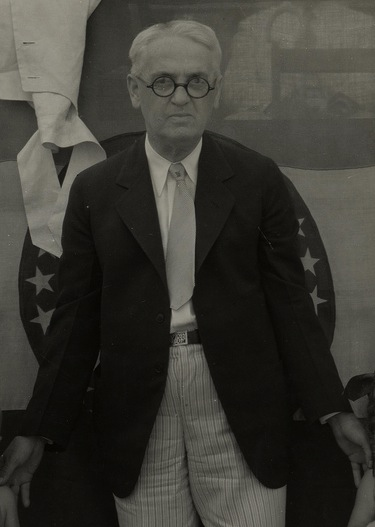

38th Governor of Missouri
- In office January 9, 1933 – January 11, 1937
- Lieutenant: Frank Gaines Harris
- Preceded by: Henry Stewart Caulfield
- Succeeded by: Lloyd Crow Stark

Personal details
- Born: June 10, 1872 Platte City, Missouri, U.S.
- Died: October 1, 1946 (aged 74) Jefferson City, Missouri, U.S.
- Party: Democratic
- Education: University of Missouri School of Law
- Profession: Judge

Guy Brasfield Park (June 10, 1872 – October 1, 1946) was an American politician from the U.S. state of Missouri.

Park was born in Platte City, Missouri to Thomas Woodson and Margaret Baxter Park. He studied at Gaylord Institute in Platte City and graduated from law school at the University of Missouri in 1896. Park practiced law in Platte City and served as Platte City's attorney and Platte County prosecuting attorney. He married Eleanora Gabbert in 1909. Together they had a daughter, Henrietta.

In 1922, Park was elected as a judge for Missouri's fifth judicial circuit court and the Missouri State Constitutional Convention. In 1928, he was re-elected as circuit court judge, but resigned in 1932 to pursue a gubernatorial nomination. Park was selected by the Missouri Democratic Party as a candidate for Governor of Missouri after candidate Francis Wilson died in October 1932. Park defeated opponent Edward Winter by over 300,000 votes.

Park's administration established state relief programs to address the economic hardships of the Great Depression and coordinated with Federal relief programs, such as the Works Progress Administration. During his term, Missouri also enlarged and improved state parks. Park was backed by Kansas City boss Tom Pendergast, and some speculated that Park allowed Pendergast to run the state of Missouri, including the diversion of federal relief money to Kansas City, Missouri and businesses owned by Pendergast and his associates.

Park was not eligible to seek re-election in 1936 and he returned to practicing law in Platte City. His political service included two further Missouri State Constitutional Conventions in 1943 and 1944. He died on October 1, 1946, in Jefferson City, Missouri.

Party political offices
| Preceded by Francis Wilson | Democratic nominee for Governor of Missouri; 1932 | Succeeded by Lloyd C. Stark |
Political offices
| Preceded by Henry S. Caulfield | Governor of Missouri; 1933-1937 | Succeeded by Lloyd C. Stark |
