= 1928 Missouri gubernatorial election =

- November 6, 1928
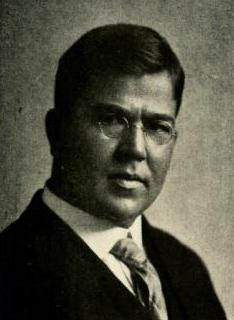

Nominee	Henry S. Caulfield	Francis Wilson
Party	Republican	Democratic
Popular vote	784,311	731,783
Percentage	51.63%	48.17%
- County results Caulfield: 50–60% 60–70% 70–80% 80–90% Wilson: 50–60% 60–70% 70–80% 80–90%
Governor before election
Sam Aaron Baker
Republican
Elected Governor
Henry S. Caulfield
Republican

The 1928 Missouri gubernatorial election was held on November 6, 1928, and resulted in a victory for the Republican nominee, former Congressman Henry S. Caulfield, over the Democratic nominee, Francis M. Wilson, and several other candidates representing minor parties. Caulfield defeated lieutenant governor Philip Allen Bennett for the Republican nomination.

== Results ==
1928 gubernatorial election, Missouri
Party	Candidate	Votes	%	±%
Republican	Henry S. Caulfield	784,311	51.63	+2.24
Democratic	Francis M. Wilson	731,783	48.17	−0.77
Socialist	Joseph G. Hodges	2,412	0.16	−1.46
Prohibition	W. G. Brandenburg	400	0.03	−0.48
Socialist Labor	Edward G. Middlecoff	248	0.02	−0.03
Majority		52,528	3.46	+3.01
Turnout		1,519,154	44.63	+6.55
Republican hold		Swing		
