= Roy McKittrick =

American politician (1888–1961)

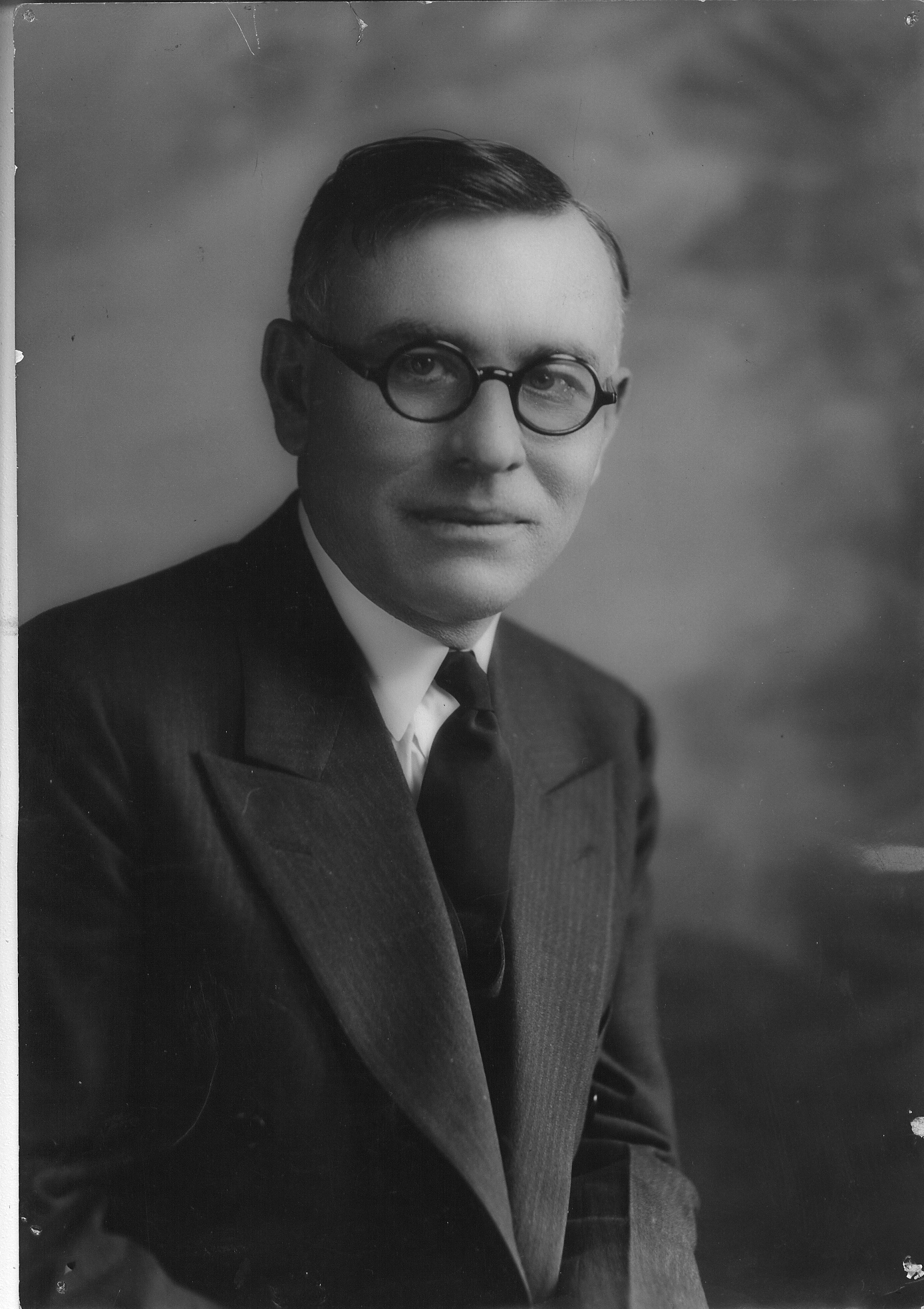

Member of the Missouri Senate from the 6th district
- In office 1930–?

Attorney General of Missouri
- In office 1933–1945
- Governor: Guy Brasfield Park; Lloyd C. Stark; Forrest C. Donnell
- Preceded by: Stratton Shartel
- Succeeded by: Jonathan E. Taylor

Personal details
- Born: August 24, 1888 Guthrie Mill, Chariton County, Missouri, U.S.
- Died: January 22, 1961 (aged 72)
- Party: Democratic
- Occupation: politician, prosecuting attorney, lawyer

Roy McKittrick (August 24, 1888 – January 22, 1961) was an American politician from Salisbury, Missouri, who served as Missouri Attorney General around the time of the World War II from 1933 until 1945. In 1944, he ran for the U.S. Senate, but Forrest C. Donnell won the seat with 49.95% of the vote, defeating by McKittrick by less than 2,000 out of over 1.5 million cast. McKittrick also served in the Missouri Senate where he served as chairman of the committee on Banks and Banking. He had previously been elected Chariton County in 1914, 1916, and 1918. McKittrick was educated at the Hale High School and Prairie Hill Academy.

Party political offices
Preceded by Elmer O. Jones	Democratic nominee for Missouri Attorney General; 1932, 1936, 1940	Succeeded by Jonathan E. Taylor
Preceded by Bennett Champ Clark	Democratic nominee for Senator from Missouri (Class 3); 1944	Succeeded by Thomas C. Hennings Jr.
Legal offices
Preceded by Stratton Shartel	Attorney General of Missouri; 1933-1945	Succeeded by Jonathan E. "Buck" Taylor
