= Lemuel Searcy =

American politician and lawyer

Lemuel Newland Searcy, also known as L. N. Searcy, (May 8, 1882 – September 25, 1944) was an American Democratic politician and lawyer who served in the Missouri General Assembly. He served in the Missouri Senate between 1927 and 1931 and between 1935 and 1943.

Born in Audrain County, Missouri, he was educated in the public schools of Birch Tree and Eminence and Southwest Missouri State Teachers College. On June 3, 1903, he married Nannie A. Parker. Lemuel Newland Searcy died September 25, 1944, at age 62, and his wife Nannie Searcy had died about four and a half months earlier on May 2, 1944, at the age of 69.
