= Bennett Champ Clark =

American politician and judge (1890–1954)

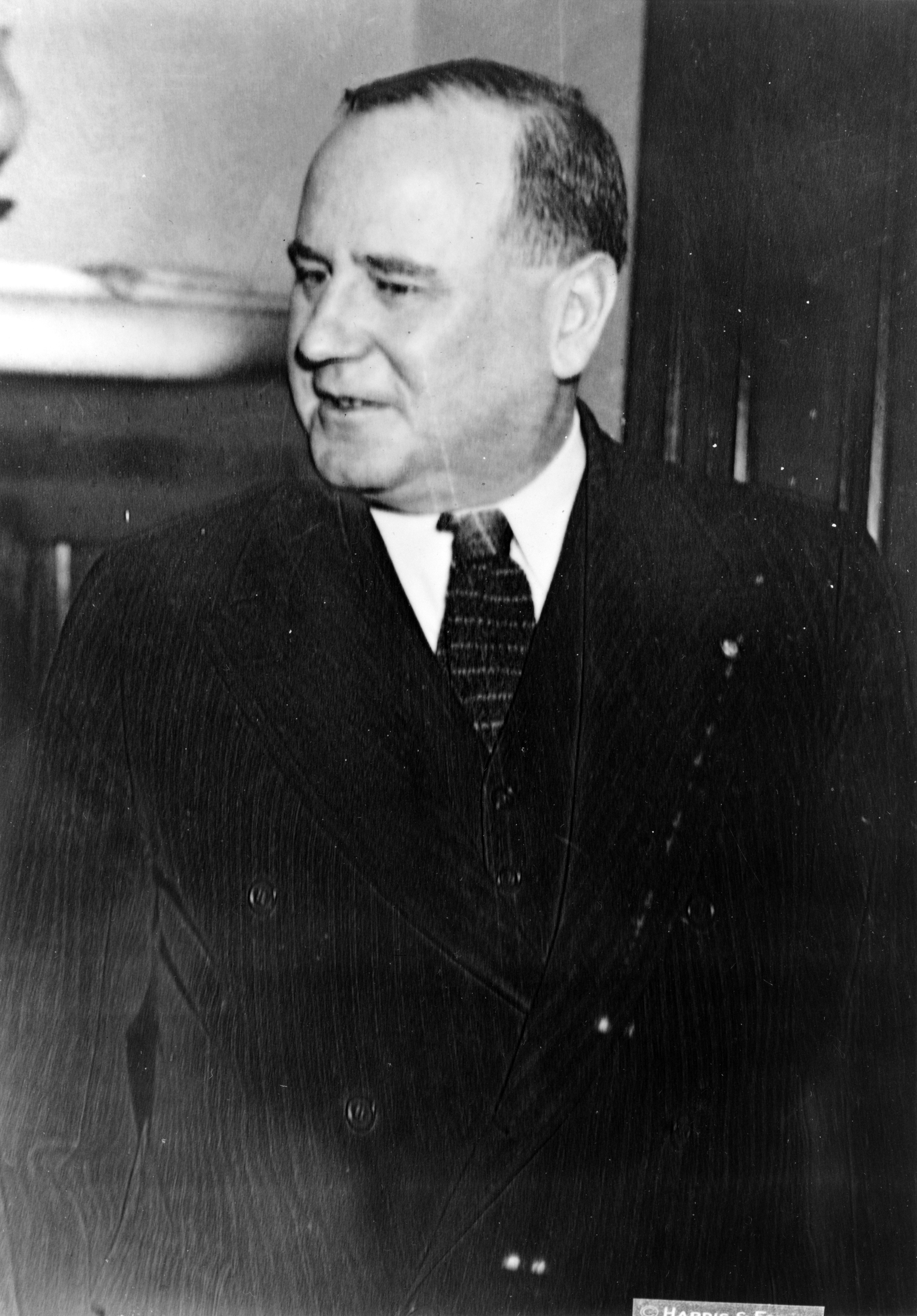

Judge of the United States Court of Appeals for the District of Columbia Circuit
- In office September 28, 1945 – July 13, 1954
- Appointed by: Harry S. Truman
- Preceded by: Thurman Arnold
- Succeeded by: Walter M. Bastian

United States Senator from Missouri
- In office February 3, 1933 – January 3, 1945
- Preceded by: Harry B. Hawes
- Succeeded by: Forrest C. Donnell

Personal details
- Born: Joel Bennett Clark; January 8, 1890 Bowling Green, Missouri, U.S.
- Died: July 13, 1954 (aged 64) Gloucester, Massachusetts, U.S.
- Resting place: Arlington National Cemetery
- Party: Democratic
- Spouse(s): Miriam Marsh (m. 1922-1943, her death); Violet Heming (m. 1945-1954, his death)
- Education: University of Missouri (BA); George Washington University (LLB)

Military service
- Allegiance: United States
- Branch/service: United States Army
- Years of service: 1917–1919; 1921-1928
- Rank: Colonel
- Unit: 35th Division; 88th Division
- Battles/wars: World War I

Joel Bennett Clark (January 8, 1890 – July 13, 1954), better known as Bennett Champ Clark, was a Democratic United States senator from Missouri from 1933 until 1945, and was later a circuit judge of the District of Columbia Circuit. He was a leading isolationist in foreign policy.

During the Thirties, Clark opposed a number of New Deal measures such as tax reform, the NRA, and the AAA, and by 1937 had become (according to one historian) “one of the organizers of the conservative coalition in Congress.” Nevertheless, Clark identified himself with liberalism, and during his senate career publicly supported New Deal initiatives aimed at providing social security, promoting homebuilding, and improving working conditions.

== Education and start of career ==
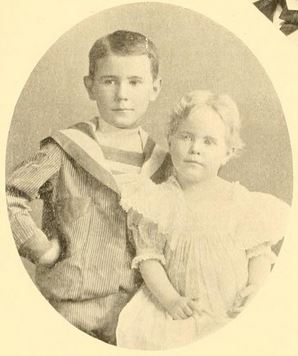
Bennet and Genevieve Clark

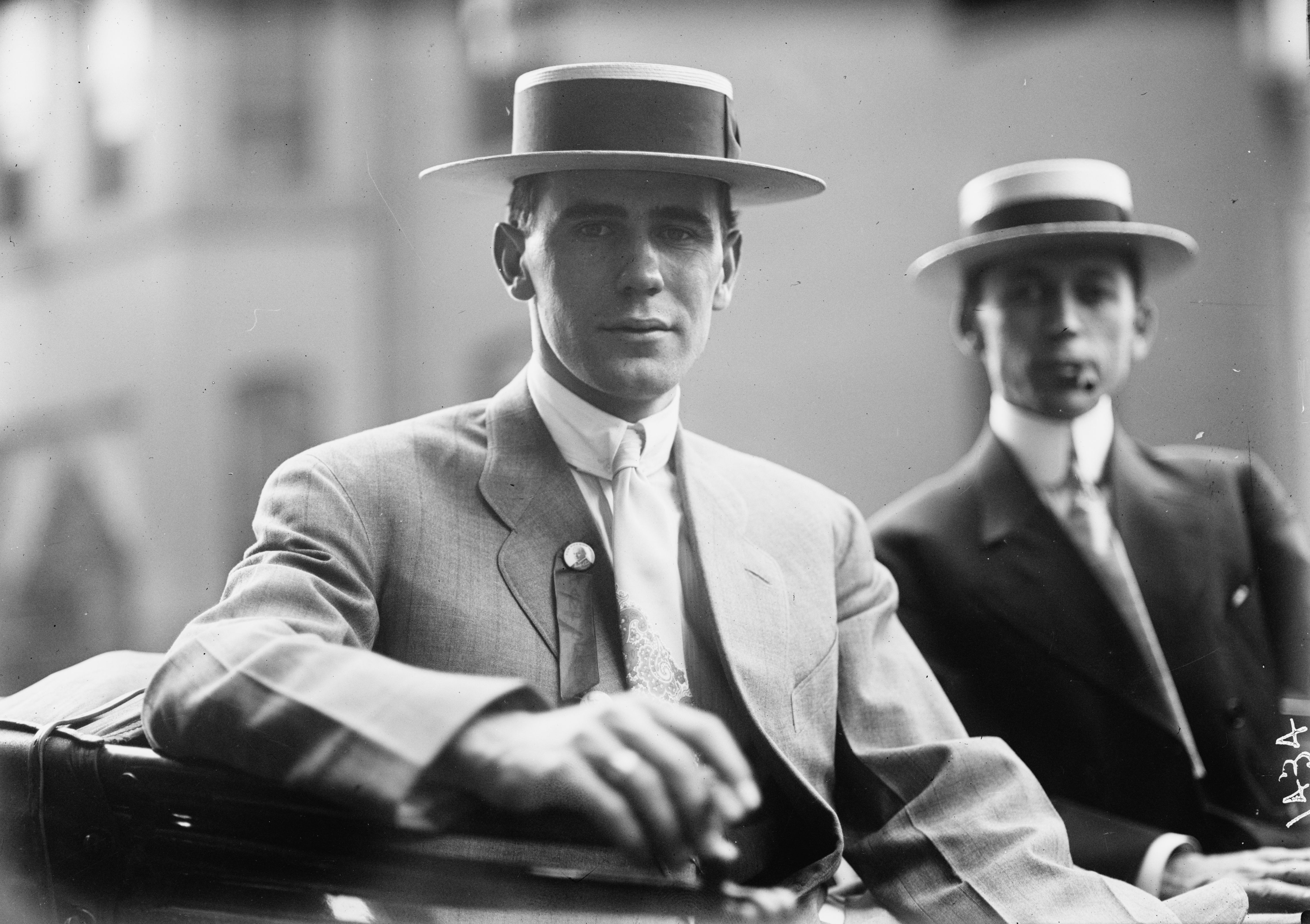
Clark at the 1912 Democratic National Convention

Clark was born into a political family; his father was Champ Clark, who served as Speaker of the United States House of Representatives. His mother was Genevieve Davis (Bennett) Clark. Clark's sister, Genevieve Clark Thomson was also active in politics as a women's suffrage activist.

Clark was born in Bowling Green, Missouri, and was raised and educated in Bowling Green and Washington, D.C. He was a graduate of Washington, D.C.'s Eastern High School. Clark graduated from the University of Missouri in Columbia, Missouri with a Bachelor of Arts degree in 1912 and was a member of Phi Beta Kappa. In 1914, he graduated from the George Washington University Law School with a Bachelor of Laws. In addition to Phi Beta Kappa, Clark's other academic affiliations included Order of the Coif, Delta Sigma Rho, Delta Tau Delta, and Phi Delta Phi.

Clark became parliamentarian of the United States House of Representatives in 1913, while still in law school. He served until 1917, when he resigned in order to join the United States Army for World War I. In 1916, he was chosen to serve as parliamentarian of that year's Democratic National Convention.

== Military service ==
Clark joined the United States Army in 1917, completed officer training at the First Officers' Training Camp held at Fort Myer, Virginia, and was commissioned as a captain. He was then elected lieutenant colonel and second in command of the 6th Missouri Infantry Regiment, a unit of the Missouri National Guard. This unit was subsequently called to federal service as the 140th Infantry Regiment, a unit of the 35th Division. After arriving in France, Clark served on the headquarters staffs of both the 35th and 88th Divisions. In March 1919, Clark was promoted to colonel while serving in the post-war Army that occupied Germany. Clark left active service in May 1919. He later rejoined the Missouri National Guard in 1921 as a major, serving on the staff of the adjutant general until 1928.

He was an organizer of the first American Legion convention in Paris, and was elected as the organization's first national commander. After leaving the Army in 1919, Clark maintained a lifelong active interest in the 35th Division Veterans Association, the American Legion, and the Veterans of Foreign Wars. From 1919 to 1922, Clark served as president of the National Guard Association of the United States.

== Continued career ==
In 1919, Clark began practicing law in St. Louis, Missouri. In the 1920s he researched and authored a biography of John Quincy Adams, and was active in politics as a campaign speaker for Democratic candidates in Missouri. In 1928 he considered running for the United States Senate seat of the retiring James A. Reed, but decided not to make the race.

Clark was a delegate to the 1928 Democratic National Convention. He served again as a delegate to the Democratic National Convention of 1936. He was a delegate again in 1940, and served as a delegate to the party's national convention in 1944. In 1944, Clark made the speech nominating Harry S. Truman for vice president.

== United States senator ==
In the 1932 election, Clark ran for the United States Senate seat held by the retiring Harry B. Hawes, and relied on his base among veterans to defeat two other candidates for the Democratic nomination. Clark defeated Henry Kiel in the general election for the term beginning March 4, 1933. Hawes resigned on February 3, 1933, a month before his term was to end, and Clark was appointed to fill the vacancy, gaining seniority on other senators elected in 1932. Clark was re-elected in the 1938 election, and served from February 3, 1933, to January 3, 1945. In 1944, Clark was an unsuccessful candidate for renomination, losing the Democratic primary to state Attorney General Roy McKittrick, who lost the general election to Republican Governor Forrest C. Donnell.

In fall of 1937, Clark displayed a poster on the wall of the Senate chamber that included two images of the dead bodies of Roosevelt Townes and Robert McDaniels, victims of a lynching in Duck Hill, Mississippi in April. The poster read, "These blow torch lynchings occurred while the Wagner-Van Nuys Anti-Lynching Bill was Pending before Congress. There have been NO arrests, NO Indictments, NO Convictions, of any one of the lynchers. This was NOT a rape case."

Clark was chairman of the Senate Committee on Interoceanic Canals from 1937 to 1935. He was a member of the Smithsonian Institution's Board of Regents from 1940 to 1944.

In April 1943, a confidential analysis of the Senate Foreign Relations Committee (of which Clark was a member) by British scholar Isaiah Berlin for the British Foreign Office succinctly characterized Clark as:

a rabid isolationist and member of the American First Committee who has steadily voted against all the foreign policies and war measures of the Administration with the exception of the reciprocal trade agreements (in which the corn exporters of Missouri have some interest). A member of the Wheeler-Nye-[Robert A.] Taft coterie. An avowed Anglophobe.

On January 29, 1944, Clark declared on the floor of the Senate that Emperor Hirohito should be hanged as a war criminal at the war's end. In the same year, he was the first senator to introduce the G.I. Bill proposal in the United States Congress.

When Congress began work on the G.I. Bill in 1944 it had originally expressed concern about possible misuse of the "blue discharge" (now called an "Other Than Honorable discharge"). In testimony before the United States Senate, Rear Admiral Randall Jacobs strongly opposed the provision to include Veterans with blue discharges on the grounds that it would undermine morale and remove any incentive to maintain a good service record. Senator Clark, a sponsor (writer) of the GI Bill, dismissed his concerns, calling them "some of the most stupid, short-sighted objections which could be raised". Clark went on to say:

The Army is giving Blue discharges, namely discharges without honor, to those who have had no fault other than they have not shown sufficient aptitude for military service. I say that when the government puts a man in the military service and, thereafter, because the man does not show sufficient aptitude gives him a blue discharge, or a discharge without honor, that fact should not be permitted to prevent the man from receiving the benefits to which soldiers are generally entitled.

== Federal judicial service ==
Clark was nominated by President Harry S. Truman on September 12, 1945, to an Associate Justice seat on the United States Court of Appeals for the District of Columbia (United States Circuit Judge of the United States Court of Appeals for the District of Columbia Circuit from June 25, 1948) vacated by Associate Justice Thurman Arnold. He was confirmed by the United States Senate on September 24, 1945, and received his commission on September 28, 1945. His service terminated on July 13, 1954, due to his death.

== Death and burial ==
Clark was ill during the last year of his life and died in Gloucester, Massachusetts on July 13, 1954. He was buried at Arlington National Cemetery.

== Awards ==
Clark was the recipient of honorary degrees from several colleges and universities. He received honorary LL.D. degrees from the University of Missouri, Marshall College, Bethany College, and Washington and Lee University.

== Family ==
In 1922, Clark married Miriam Marsh, the daughter of Wilbur W. Marsh. They were the parents of three children, Champ, Marsh, and Kimball. Miriam Clark died in 1943, and in 1945 Clark married British actress Violet Heming. The ceremony took place at the Berryville, Virginia home of Clark's sister, and President Truman served as best man.

== In popular culture ==
Clark and other isolationist senators are referenced in the Woody Guthrie song Mister Charlie Lindbergh. Guthrie's 1943 lyrics condemn pre-World War II isolationism and advocate for leaders committed to defeating fascism.

== See also ==
- List of members of the American Legion

== External sources ==
- United States Congress. "Bennett Champ Clark (id: C000440)". Biographical Directory of the United States Congress.

Party political offices
Preceded by Harry B. Hawes	Democratic nominee for senator from Missouri (Class 3); 1932, 1938	Succeeded by Roy McKittrick
U.S. Senate
Preceded by Harry B. Hawes	United States senator (Class 3) from Missouri; 1933–1945	Succeeded by Forrest C. Donnell
Legal offices
Preceded by Thurman Arnold	Judge of the United States Court of Appeals for the District of Columbia Circuit; 1945–1954	Succeeded by Walter M. Bastian
