= List of elections in 1924 =

The following elections occurred in the year 1924.

== Africa ==
- Egyptian parliamentary election
- South African general election
- Southern Rhodesian general election

== Asia ==
- Ceylonese Legislative Council election
- Dutch East Indies Volksraad election
- Egyptian parliamentary election
- Hong Kong sanitary board election
- Mongolian parliamentary election
- Japanese general election
- Soviet Union legislative election

== Europe ==
- Danish Folketing election
- Danish Landsting election
- Faroese general election
- Finnish parliamentary election
- French legislative election
- German federal election
- German federal election
- Italian general election
- Liechtenstein local elections
- Norwegian parliamentary election
- Soviet Union legislative election
- Swedish general election

=== United Kingdom ===
- 1924 United Kingdom general election
  - England: 1924 United Kingdom general election in England
  - Scotland: 1924 United Kingdom general election in Scotland
  - Wales: 1924 United Kingdom general election in Wales
  - Northern Ireland: 1924 United Kingdom general election in Northern Ireland
  - List of MPs elected in the 1924 United Kingdom general election
- 1924 Burnley by-election
- 1924 Carmarthen by-election
- 1924 City of London by-election
- 1924 Dover by-election
- 1924 Dundee by-election
- 1924 Glasgow Kelvingrove by-election
- 1924 Holland with Boston by-election
- 1924 Lewes by-election
- 1924 Liverpool West Toxteth by-election
- 1924 Oxford by-election
- 1924 Westminster Abbey by-election

== North America ==
=== Canada ===
- 1924 British Columbia general election
- By-elections to the 14th Canadian Parliament
- 1924 Edmonton municipal election
- 1924 Newfoundland general election
- 1924 Ontario prohibition referendum
- Ottawa municipal election (January)
- Ottawa municipal election (December)
- 1924 Toronto municipal election

=== Caribbean ===
- 1924 Cuban general election
- 1924 Dominican Republic general election

=== United States ===
- 1924 New York state election
- 1924 United States elections
- 1924 United States presidential election

==== United States lieutenant gubernatorial ====
- 1924 Connecticut lieutenant gubernatorial election
- 1924 Illinois lieutenant gubernatorial election
- 1924 Minnesota lieutenant gubernatorial election
- 1924 Missouri lieutenant gubernatorial election
- 1924 Nebraska lieutenant gubernatorial election
- 1924 Texas lieutenant gubernatorial election
- 1924 Wisconsin lieutenant gubernatorial election

==== United States gubernatorial ====
- 1924 Arizona gubernatorial election
- 1924 Arkansas gubernatorial election
- 1924 Colorado gubernatorial election
- 1924 Connecticut gubernatorial election
- 1924 Delaware gubernatorial election
- 1924 Florida gubernatorial election
- 1924 Georgia gubernatorial election
- 1924 Idaho gubernatorial election
- 1924 Illinois gubernatorial election
- 1924 Indiana gubernatorial election
- 1924 Iowa gubernatorial election
- 1924 Kansas gubernatorial election
- 1924 Louisiana gubernatorial election
- 1924 Maine gubernatorial election
- 1924 Massachusetts gubernatorial election
- 1924 Michigan gubernatorial election
- 1924 Minnesota gubernatorial election
- 1924 Missouri gubernatorial election
- 1924 Montana gubernatorial election
- 1924 Nebraska gubernatorial election
- 1924 New Hampshire gubernatorial election
- 1924 New Mexico gubernatorial election
- 1924 New York gubernatorial election
- 1924 North Dakota gubernatorial election
- 1924 Ohio gubernatorial election
- 1924 Rhode Island gubernatorial election
- 1924 South Carolina gubernatorial election
- 1924 South Dakota gubernatorial election
- 1924 Tennessee gubernatorial election
- 1924 Texas gubernatorial election
- 1924 United States gubernatorial elections
- 1924 Utah gubernatorial election
- 1924 Vermont gubernatorial election
- 1924 Washington gubernatorial election
- 1924 West Virginia gubernatorial election
- 1924 Wisconsin gubernatorial election
- 1924 Wyoming gubernatorial special election

==== United States House of Representatives ====
- 1924 United States House of Representatives elections
- 1924 United States House of Representatives elections in California
- 1924 United States House of Representatives elections in South Carolina

==== United States Senate ====
- 1924 United States Senate elections
- 1924 United States Senate election in Alabama
- 1924 United States Senate election in Arkansas
- 1924 United States Senate election in Colorado
- 1924 United States Senate special election in Colorado
- 1924 United States Senate election in Georgia
- 1924 United States Senate election in Idaho
- 1924 United States Senate election in Illinois
- 1924 United States Senate election in Iowa
- 1924 United States Senate election in Kansas
- 1924 United States Senate election in Kentucky
- 1924 United States Senate election in Maine
- 1924 United States Senate election in Massachusetts
- 1924 United States Senate election in Michigan
- 1924 United States Senate election in Minnesota
- 1924 United States Senate election in Montana
- 1924 United States Senate election in Nebraska
- 1924 United States Senate election in New Hampshire
- 1924 United States Senate election in New Jersey
- 1924 United States Senate election in Oklahoma
- 1924 United States Senate election in South Carolina
- 1924 United States Senate election in South Dakota
- 1924 United States Senate election in Tennessee
- 1924 United States Senate election in Texas
- 1924 United States Senate election in Virginia
- 1924 United States Senate election in Wyoming

== Central and South America ==
- 1924 Argentine legislative election
- 1924 Chilean parliamentary election
- Cuban general election
- Dominican Republic general election
- 1924 Ecuadorian presidential election
- 1924 Honduran general election
- 1924 Newfoundland general election
- 1924 Nicaraguan general election
- 1924 Panamanian general election
- 1924 Puerto Rican general election

== Oceania ==
=== Australia ===
- Barossa state by-election
- Dalhousie state by-election
- South Australian state election
- Victorian state election
- Western Australian state election
- 1924 South Australian state election

== See also ==
- Category:1924 elections
