= 1924 Missouri Attorney General election =

- November 4, 1924

Nominee	Robert William Otto	Elmer O. Jones
Party	Republican	Democratic
Popular vote	653,784	611,571
Percentage	51.63%	48.30%
Attorney General before election
Jesse W. Barrett
Republican
Elected Attorney General
Robert William Otto
Republican

The 1924 Missouri Attorney General election was held on November 4, 1924, in order to elect the attorney general of Missouri. Republican nominee Robert William Otto defeated Democratic nominee Elmer O. Jones and Socialist Labor nominee Edward G. Middlecoff.

== General election ==
On election day, November 4, 1924, Republican nominee Robert William Otto won the election by a margin of 42,213 votes against his foremost opponent Democratic nominee Elmer O. Jones, thereby retaining Republican control over the office of attorney general. Otto was sworn in as the 29th attorney general of Missouri on January 12, 1925.

=== Results ===
Missouri Attorney General election, 1924
Party	Candidate	Votes	%
Republican	Robert William Otto	653,784	51.63
Democratic	Elmer O. Jones	611,571	48.30
Socialist Labor	Edward G. Middlecoff	848	0.07
Total votes		1,266,203	100.00
Republican hold			

== See also ==
- 1924 Missouri gubernatorial election
