= 1924 Missouri Secretary of State election =

- November 4, 1924

Nominee	Charles Becker	Kate S. Morrow
Party	Republican	Democratic
Popular vote	661,048	603,802
Percentage	51.35%	46.90%
Secretary of State before election
Charles Becker
Republican
Elected Secretary of State
Charles Becker
Republican

The 1924 Missouri Secretary of State election was held on November 4, 1924, in order to elect the secretary of state of Missouri. Republican nominee and incumbent secretary of state Charles Becker defeated Democratic nominee Kate S. Morrow, Socialist nominee David S. Landis and Socialist Labor nominee Karl Oberheu.

== General election ==
On election day, November 4, 1924, Republican nominee Charles Becker won re-election by a margin of 57,246 votes against his foremost opponent Democratic nominee Kate S. Morrow, thereby retaining Republican control over the office of secretary of state. Becker was sworn in for his second term on January 12, 1925.

=== Results ===
Missouri Secretary of State election, 1924
Party	Candidate	Votes	%
Republican	Charles Becker (incumbent)	661,048	51.35
Democratic	Kate S. Morrow	603,802	46.90
Socialist	David S. Landis	21,878	1.70
Socialist Labor	Karl Oberheu	591	0.05
Total votes		1,287,319	100.00
Republican hold			

== See also ==
- 1924 Missouri gubernatorial election
