= Wallace Crossley =

American politician (1874–1943)

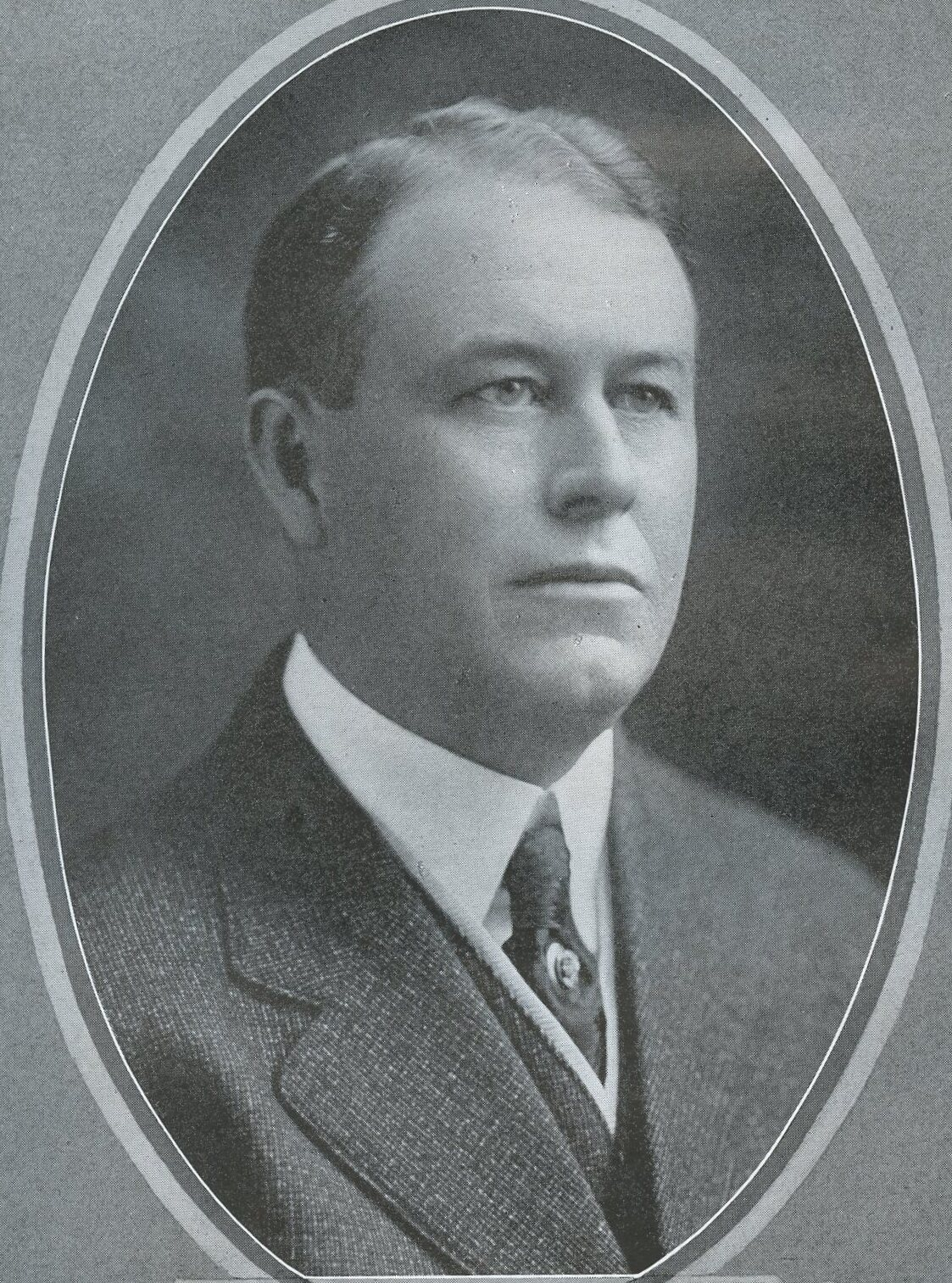
- Crossley in 1917

Lieutenant Governor of Missouri
- In office 1917–1921
- Governor: Frederick D. Gardner
- Preceded by: William Rock Painter
- Succeeded by: Hiram Lloyd

Member of the Missouri Senate from the 17th district
- In office 1913–1917
- Succeeded by: David W. Stark

Member of the Missouri House of Representatives from the Johnson County district
- In office 1905–1910
- Preceded by: George S. Young
- Succeeded by: A. C. Crank

Personal details
- Born: October 4, 1874 Bellair, Missouri, US
- Died: December 13, 1943 (aged 69) Warrensburg, Missouri, US
- Party: Democratic
- Occupation: Politician

Wallace Crossley (October 4, 1874 – December 13, 1943) was an American politician. A Democrat, he was the Lieutenant Governor of Missouri, under Frederick D. Gardner.

== Early life and education ==
Crossley was born on October 4, 1874, in Bellair, Missouri, the son of S. W. Crossley and Elberta (née Givens) Crossley. His father was an educator and Confederate veteran of the American Civil War, serving under Stonewall Jackson and losing his right arm in the conflict. He attended school in Mexico, Missouri and studied at Missouri State University and William Jewell College.

== Career ==
After schooling, Crossley worked as an educator in Mexico, Pilot Grove, and spent three years as an English professor at the University of Central Missouri. In 1903, he purchased the Johnson County Star, which he also edited. During World War I, he was appointed by President Woodrow Wilson to manage Missouri's fuel, with his work as such being used as an example for other states.

Crossley was a Democrat. From 1905 to 1910, he was a member of the Missouri House of Representatives, representing Johnson County. He then was a member of the Missouri Senate, representing its 17th district from 1913 to 1916. He was Lieutenant Governor of Missouri from 1917 to 1921, serving under Frederick D. Gardner, and for a time was acting Governor. In 1922 and 1923, he was a delegate to the Missouri State Constitutional Convention from the 17th district. Politically, he was progressive and supported reforms to education, infrastructure, and penal labor.

== Personal life and death ==
On December 30, 1902, Crossley married Erma Cheatham. He was a Baptist, as well as a member of the Benevolent and Protective Order of Elks and the Freemasons. He died on December 13, 1943, aged 69, in Warrensburg.

Party political offices
Preceded by William Rock Painter	Democratic nominee for Lieutenant Governor of Missouri; 1916	Succeeded by Carter M. Buford
Political offices
Preceded by William R. Painter	Lieutenant Governor of Missouri; 1917–1921	Succeeded by Hiram Lloyd
