= Senator Buford =

Senator Buford may refer to:

- Carter M. Buford (1876–1959), Missouri State Senate
- Tom Buford (1949–2021), Kentucky State Senate
