= 1920 Missouri lieutenant gubernatorial election =

- November 2, 1920
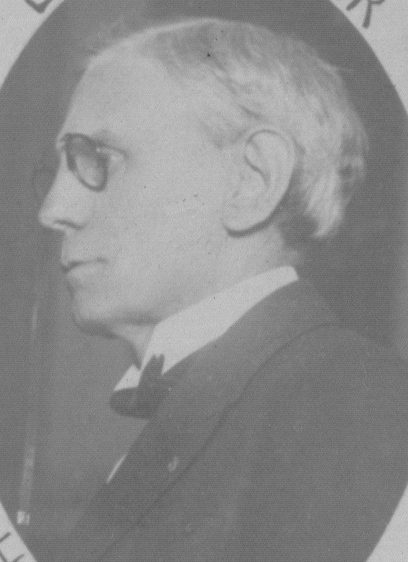

Nominee	Hiram Lloyd	Carter M. Buford
Party	Republican	Democratic
Popular vote	723,048	579,865
Percentage	54.49%	43.70%
Lieutenant Governor before election
Wallace Crossley
Democratic
Elected Lieutenant Governor
Hiram Lloyd
Republican

The 1920 Missouri lieutenant gubernatorial election was held on November 2, 1920. Republican nominee Hiram Lloyd defeated Democratic nominee Carter M. Buford with 54.49% of the vote.

== Primary elections ==
Primary elections were held on August 3, 1920.

=== Democratic primary ===
==== Candidates ====
- Carter M. Buford, State Senator
- Robert S. McClintic

==== Results ====
Democratic primary results
Party	Candidate	Votes	%
Democratic	Carter M. Buford	91,032	53.88
Democratic	Robert S. McClintic	77,933	46.12
Total votes		168,965	100.00

=== Republican primary ===
==== Candidates ====
- Hiram Lloyd, former State Representative
- Politte Elvins, former U.S. Representative

==== Results ====
Republican primary results
Party	Candidate	Votes	%
Republican	Hiram Lloyd	100,506	52.61
Republican	Politte Elvins	90,520	47.39
Total votes		191,026	100.00

== General election ==
=== Candidates ===
Major party candidates

- Hiram Lloyd, Republican
- Carter M. Buford, Democratic

Other candidates

- Louis Schneider, Socialist
- E. H. Wessler, Farmer–Labor
- Theodore Baeff, Socialist Labor

=== Results ===
1920 Missouri lieutenant gubernatorial election
Party	Candidate	Votes	%	±%
Republican	Hiram Lloyd	723,048	54.49%	
Democratic	Carter M. Buford	579,865	43.70%	
Socialist	Louis Schneider	19,446	1.47%	
Farmer–Labor	E. H. Wessler	3,010	0.23%	
Socialist Labor	Theodore Baeff	1,612	0.12%	
Majority		143,183		
Turnout				
Republican gain from Democratic		Swing		
