= Nevada State Hospital =

Psychiatric hospital in Missouri, United States

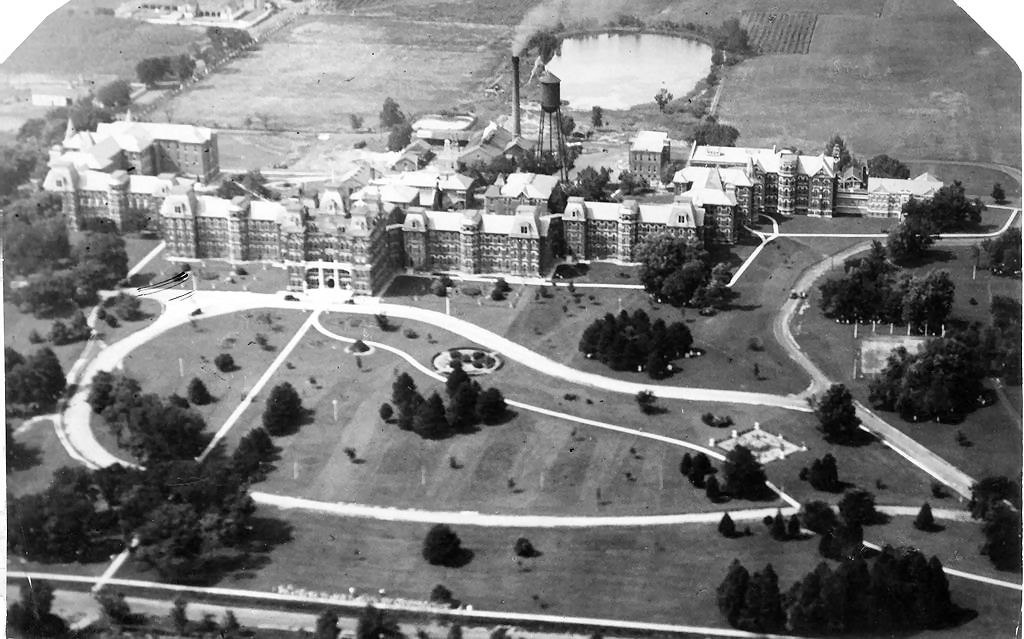
Nevada State Hospital, ca. 1890.

Nevada State Hospital was a public psychiatric hospital in Nevada, Missouri, constructed in 1887. The hospital was built in the design of the Kirkbride Plan.

== History ==
Provisions for the hospital were approved by the state of Missouri in 1885, and the hospital was constructed in 1887. The hospital officially closed in 1991, and was demolished in 1999.

== Notable patients ==
- David W. Stark, member of the Missouri State Legislature
