= Reuben T. Wood =

American politician (1884–1955)

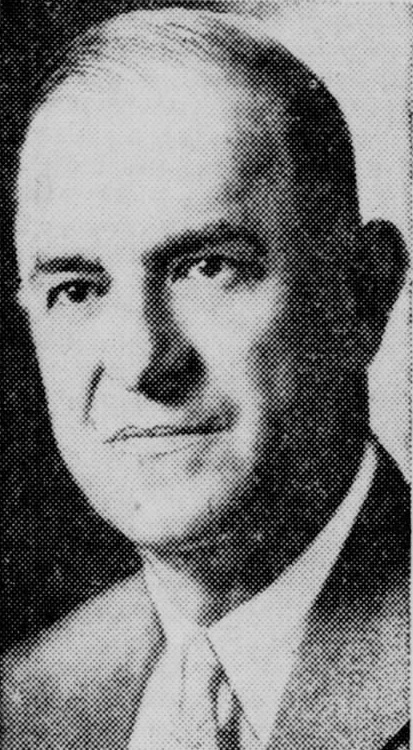
- Wood in 1936

Member of the U.S. House of Representatives from Missouri's 6th district
- In office March 4, 1933 – January 3, 1941
- Preceded by: Clement C. Dickinson
- Succeeded by: Philip A. Bennett

Personal details
- Born: March 5, 1881 Springfield, Missouri, US
- Died: July 16, 1955 (aged 70) Springfield, Missouri, US
- Party: Democratic
- Occupation: Politician, trade unionist

Reuben "Rube" Terrell Wood (August 7, 1884 – July 16, 1955) was an American politician and trade unionist. He served as a member of the United States House of Representatives from Missouri.

== Biography ==
Wood was born on August 7, 1884, on a farm near Springfield, Missouri, the son of educator H. N. B. Wood. He was educated at public schools and began working as a cigar maker at age eighteen. He involved himself in trade unionism, working as an organizer of the Springfield Central Labor Council from 1902 to 1912, then from 1912 to 1932, he served as president of the Missouri branch of the AFL-CIO, though researchers at the Duane G. Meyer Library suggest he continually held the position through his tenure in Congress and until retirement; this would make him the only U.S. Representative ever to head their respective state trade union while simultaneously in Congress.

A Democrat, Wood represented Missouri's 6th congressional district in the United States House of Representatives, from March 4, 1933, to January 3, 1941. Due to a disagreement on redistricting by the Missouri General Assembly, all Missouri Representatives were elected at-large in 1932; this led to Representatives he and James E. Ruffin both being from Missouri. During the 76th Congress, he served on the House Committee on War Claims, which handled damages caused by United States soldiers. In 1940, the Missouri Central Labor Union suggested to Franklin D. Roosevelt that Wood be nominated as United States Secretary of Labor. He lost his 1940 re-election to Philip A. Bennett. He attended the 1944 Missouri Constitutional Convention.

Active during the New Deal era, Wood was accused of associating with the Socialist Party of America due to having his name confused for one Rueben P. Wood. Although he denied being a socialist, he associated with socialists through his trade unionist activities, such as Gottlieb A. Hoehn, who composed a Congressional campaign song for him.

After serving in Congress, Wood returned to the Missouri branch of the AFL-CIO, serving as its president until retiring in May 1953. On December 31, 1936, he married Mary Ellen Eshman. He died on July 16, 1955, aged 70, at the Burge Hospital in Springfield, from a myocardial infarction. He is buried in Greenlawn Cemetery. After his death, the Missouri CIO honored him.

U.S. House of Representatives
Preceded by Clement C. Dickinson	Member of the U.S. House of Representatives from Missouri's 6th congressional district 1933–1941	Succeeded by Philip A. Bennett
