= 1924 Missouri lieutenant gubernatorial election =

- November 4, 1924
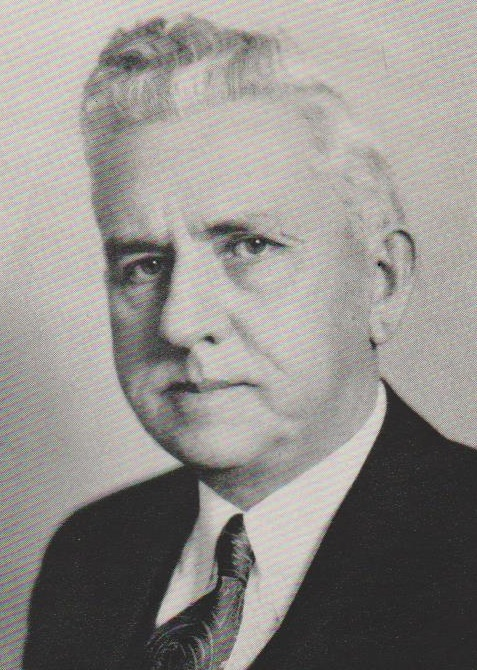

| Nominee | Philip Allen Bennett | Carter M. Buford |
| Party | Republican | Democratic |
| Popular vote | 651,857 | 613,988 |
| Percentage | 51.46% | 48.47% |
Lieutenant Governor before election
Hiram Lloyd
Republican
Elected Lieutenant Governor
Philip Allen Bennett
Republican

The 1924 Missouri lieutenant gubernatorial election was held on November 4, 1924. Republican nominee Philip Allen Bennett defeated Democratic nominee Carter M. Buford with 51.46% of the vote.

== Primary elections ==
Primary elections were held on August 5, 1924.

=== Democratic primary ===
==== Candidates ====
- Carter M. Buford, former State Senator
- Robert Lee Hains
- Everard G. Hancock
- Sam J. Coy

==== Results ====
Democratic primary results
| Party | Candidate | Votes | % |
|---|---|---|---|
| Democratic | Carter M. Buford | 132,064 | 39.88 |
| Democratic | Robert Lee Hains | 109,541 | 33.08 |
| Democratic | Everard G. Hancock | 52,501 | 15.85 |
| Democratic | Sam J. Coy | 37,078 | 11.20 |
| Total votes | | 331,184 | 100.00 |

=== Republican primary ===
==== Candidates ====
- Philip Allen Bennett, former State Senator
- Leslie J. Lyons

==== Results ====
Republican primary results
| Party | Candidate | Votes | % |
|---|---|---|---|
| Republican | Philip Allen Bennett | 170,199 | 61.70 |
| Republican | Leslie J. Lyons | 105,643 | 38.30 |
| Total votes | | 275,842 | 100.00 |

== General election ==
=== Candidates ===
Major party candidates

- Philip Allen Bennett, Republican
- Carter M. Buford, Democratic

Other candidates

- William Ungerer, Socialist Labor

=== Results ===
1924 Missouri lieutenant gubernatorial election
| Party | Candidate | Votes | % | ±% |
|---|---|---|---|---|
| Republican | Philip Allen Bennett | 651,857 | 51.46% | |
| Democratic | Carter M. Buford | 613,988 | 48.47% | |
| Socialist Labor | William Ungerer | 885 | 0.07% | |
| Majority | | 37,869 | | |
| Turnout | | | | |
| Republican hold | | Swing | | |
