= Washington and Lee University Historic District =

Historic district in Virginia, United States

- U.S. National Register of Historic Places
- U.S. National Historic Landmark District
- Virginia Landmarks Register
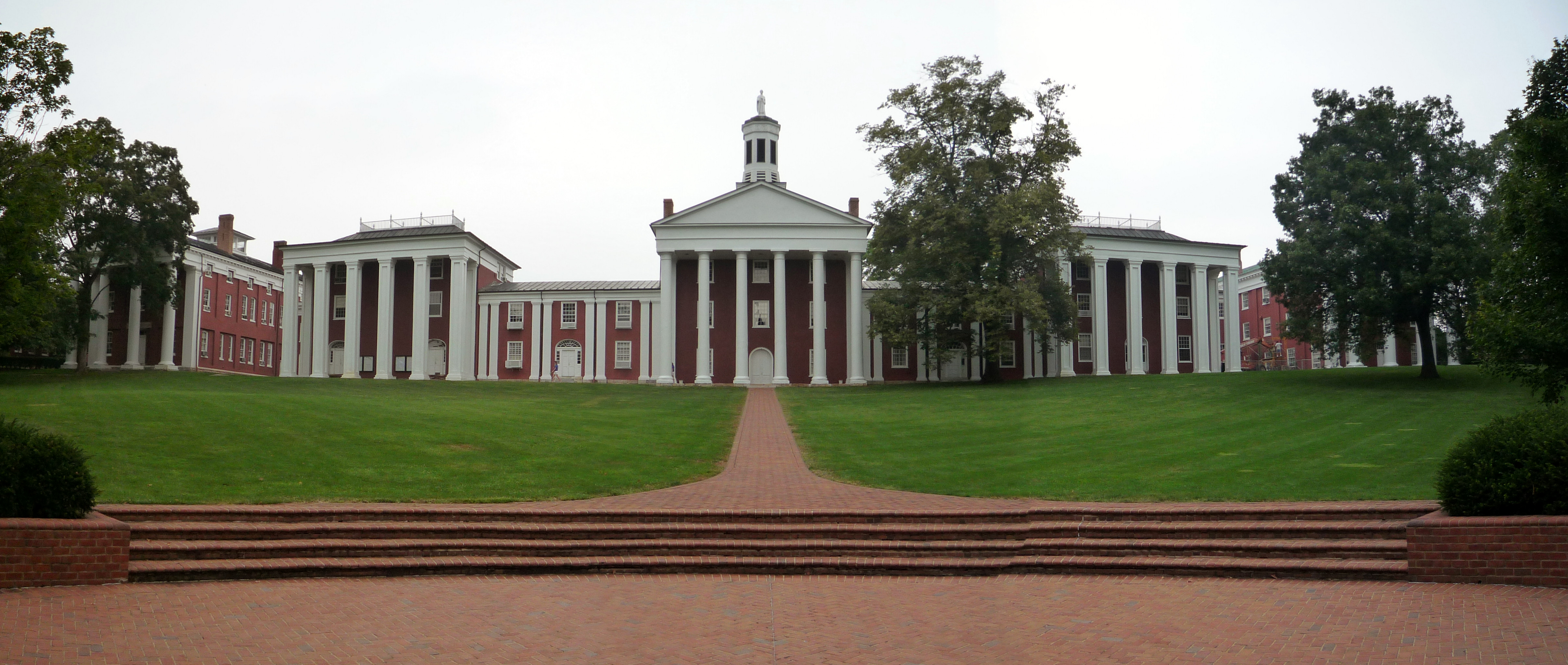

- Location within Virginia Location within the United States
- Location: Washington and Lee University campus, Lexington, Virginia
- Built: 1824
- Architect: Jordan, John
- Architectural style: Greek Revival, Neo-Classical
- NRHP reference No.: 71001047
- VLR No.: 117-0022

Significant dates
- Added to NRHP: November 11, 1971
- Designated NHLD: November 11, 1971
- Designated VLR: October 6, 1970

The Washington and Lee University Historic District is a National Historic Landmark District encompassing the historic core elements of the campus of Washington and Lee University in Lexington, Virginia. The campus's Colonnade constitutes one of the nation's finest assemblages of Classical Revival educational buildings, and includes Washington Hall, the school's oldest surviving building. The district also includes University Chapel, itself a National Historic Landmark. The district was listed in 1971.

== Description and history ==
Washington and Lee University was founded as Augusta Academy in 1749. Washington Hall, its oldest surviving building, was built in 1824 by John Jordan, a self-taught builder. It is a three-story brick building distinguished by a six-column Doric portico and a cupola topped by a statue of George Washington. Its flanking wings are also fronted by portico styling. This colonnaded Classical style set the tone for later buildings on the campus, including Newcomb Hall and Tucker Hall, which stand on either side. Newcomb, a Late Victorian building, was modified in the 1920s to conform to the Washington Building's style, and Tucker Hall was added in 1935. Flanking the three central buildings are two pairs of faculty residence halls built in 1843, each the four-column Greek Revival porticos.

This row of buildings occupy the top of a roughly north-south ridge. Down the hill to the east stands Lee Chapel, named for Robert E. Lee, who served as Washington College's president and is interred in a crypt within. After Lee's death, the school was renamed Washington and Lee to also honor his role in raising the school's status.

In 1926, the poet and dramatist John Drinkwater, author of Robert E. Lee and other plays, wrote of W&L, "This Lexington university is one of the loveliest spots in the world." Jonathan W. Daniels, North Carolina author, newspaper editor and White House Press Secretary to President Franklin D. Roosevelt, wrote that it was "the South at its most beautiful: the green sloping campus to the red-brick buildings with the tall white porticoes....I wish it were the picture of the South. I wish, indeed, it were the picture of America." Washington and Lee History Professor Ted DeLaney, who was born and grew up in Lexington during Jim Crow and spent more than 45 years of his 60-year career at W&L, more than a quarter-century as a professor, including serving as the first Black chair of the History Department, said in 2019, "W&L is unique because the entire campus is a Confederate monument."

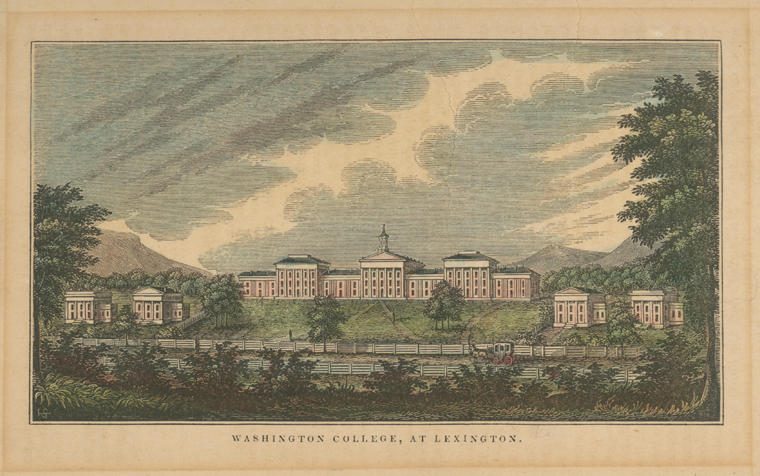
Washington College at Lexington, 1845

== See also ==
- List of National Historic Landmarks in Virginia
- National Register of Historic Places listings in Lexington, Virginia
