= Miles City Main Post Office =

- US Post Office-Miles City Main
- U.S. National Register of Historic Places
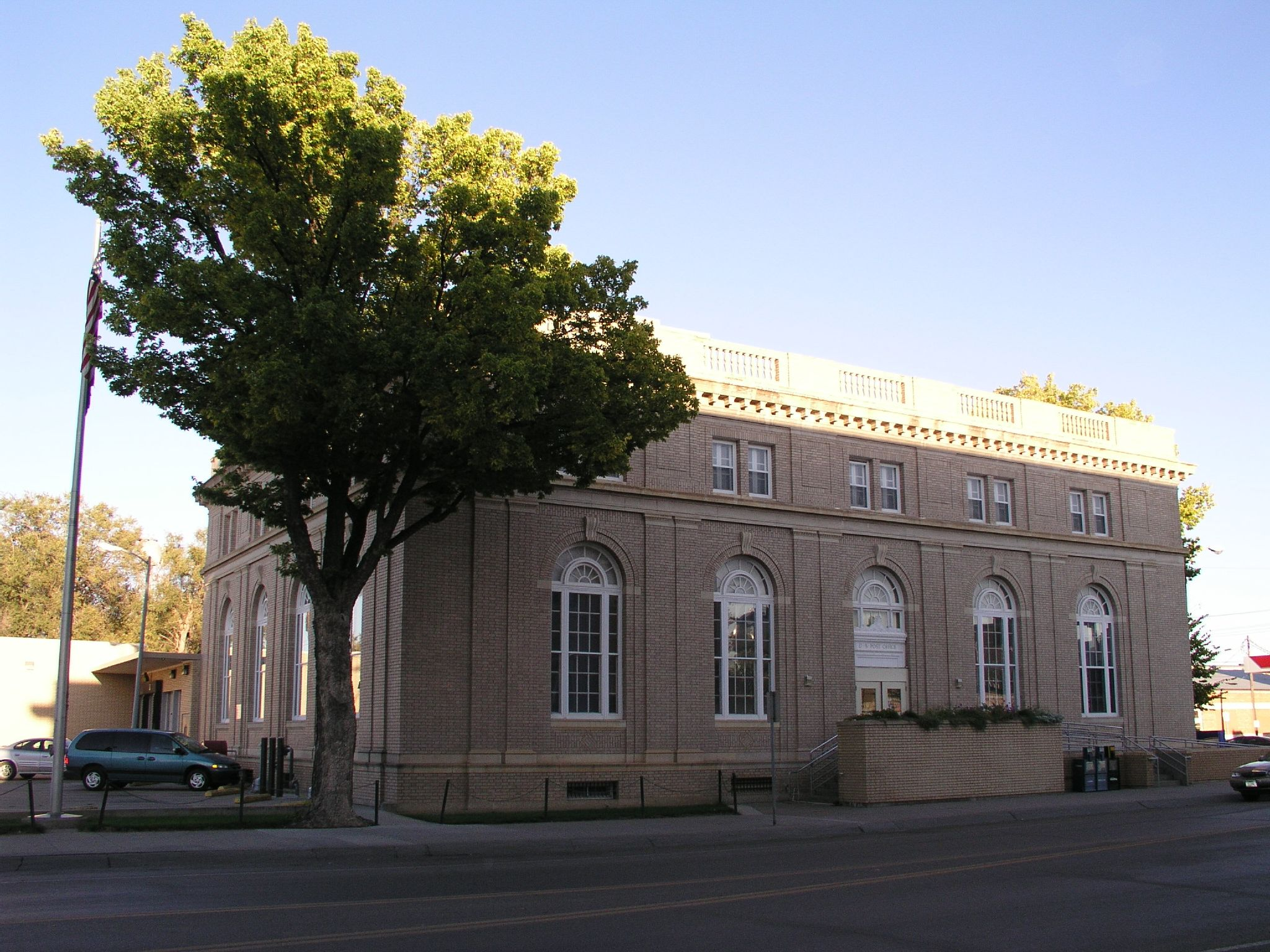

- Location within Montana Location within the United States
- Location: 106 N. Seventh St., Miles City, Montana
- Coordinates: 46°24′28″N 105°50′58″W
- Area: 0.5 acres (0.20 ha)
- Built: 1916
- Built by: Hiram Lloyd Co.
- Architect: Wenderoth, Oscar
- Architectural style: Late 19th and 20th Century Revivals, Second Renaissance Revival
- MPS: US Post Offices in Montana, 1900—1941, TR
- NRHP reference No.: 86000686
- Added to NRHP: March 14, 1986

The Miles City Main Post Office located at 106 N. Seventh St. in Miles City, Montana, is a historic post office building. It is listed on the National Register of Historic Places as U.S. Post Office-Miles City Main.

It was built in 1916 by Hiram Lloyd Co. Its design is credited to U.S. Supervising Architect Oscar Wenderoth. It was listed on the National Register of Historic Places in 1986.

It is one of 18 Federally funded post offices built in Montana during 1900–1941, all of which survived until 1985 when they were reviewed for historic registry eligibility. In the 1985 study, it was noted that a post office may have significance at a state level because it is a first or excellent example of a standardized design. The Miles City post office, completed in 1916, is from a standardized design, and is actually nearly identical to the post office in Kalispell, Montana (completed in 1918); three others in the state are also excellent examples of standard designs.

The Miles City post office also is notable for its association with the economic growth of Miles City, while others are not significant for representing such associations. Miles City had been reached by the Northern Pacific railroad in 1881, but it grew rapidly later; in 1909 its land office was processing 1200 land claims per month.

The Miles City post office was funded by the federal Public Buildings Omnibus Act of June 25, 1910, which allowed for site acquisition and building cost under a limit of $75,000.
