= Philip A. Bennett =

American politician (1881–1942)

Philip Allen Bennett
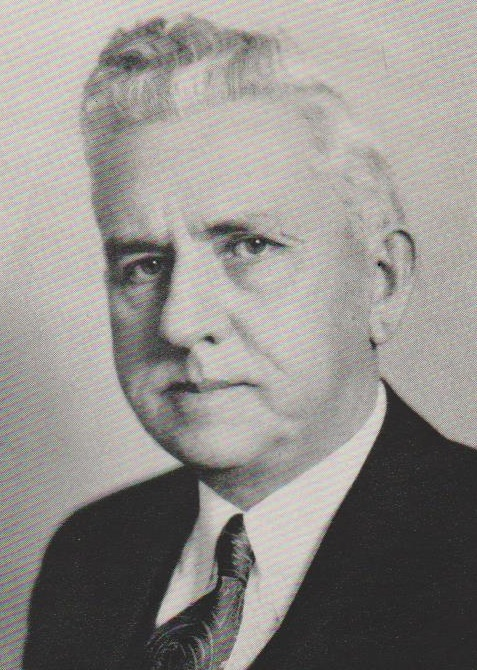

Member of the U.S. House of Representatives from Missouri's 6th district
- In office January 3, 1941 – December 7, 1942
- Preceded by: Reuben T. Wood
- Succeeded by: Marion T. Bennett

31st Lieutenant Governor of Missouri
- In office January 12, 1925 – January 14, 1929
- Governor: Samuel Aaron Baker
- Preceded by: Hiram Lloyd
- Succeeded by: Edward Henry Winter

Member of the Missouri Senate
- In office 1920–1924

Personal details
- Born: March 5, 1881 Buffalo, Missouri, U.S.
- Died: December 7, 1942 (aged 61) Washington D.C., U.S.
- Party: Republican

Philip Allen Bennett (March 5, 1881 – December 7, 1942) was a Republican politician from the state of Missouri. He served as a member of the United States House of Representatives for Missouri's 6th district during the 77th Congress. Prior to that Bennett was the 31st Lieutenant Governor of Missouri and served in the Missouri Senate.

== Biography ==
Philip A. Bennett was born near Buffalo, Missouri, to Marion F. and Mary Jane (O'Bannon) Bennett, the eighth of fourteen children. Following his graduation from Buffalo High School Bennett attended Springfield Normal and Business College (now Missouri State University), earning his degree in 1902. He taught two years in Missouri public schools and worked for the Frisco Railroad before purchasing the Buffalo Reflex newspaper in 1904. Bennett served as the editor and publisher of the Reflex until 1921, when he entered politics full-time. Bennett served as a delegate to the 1912 Republican National Convention. Philip Bennett married Mary B. Tinsley in 1912 and they had two children, a son and a daughter. His son Marion T. Bennett followed in his father's footsteps as a Missouri politician.

In 1920 he was elected to the Missouri Senate. Bennett served only one term because he ran for, and won election as, Missouri lieutenant governor in 1924. He was not successful in a bid for Missouri Governor in 1928 and returned to the private business sector. Bennett ran for the U.S. House in 1938 and was again defeated. However two years later, in 1940, he was elected to represent the 6th district of Missouri in the U.S. Congress. Reelected in November 1942, Bennett died before he could begin his second term. His son, Marion T. Bennett, completed the term. Philip Bennett died in Washington, D.C., on December 7, 1942, shortly before the beginning of his second term in Congress.

== See also ==
- List of members of the United States Congress who died in office (1900–1949)

Party political offices
Preceded by Hiram Lloyd	Republican nominee for Lieutenant Governor of Missouri; 1924	Succeeded by Edward Henry Winter
Political offices
Preceded by Hiram Lloyd	Lieutenant Governor of Missouri; 1925–1929	Succeeded by Edward H. Winter
U.S. House of Representatives
Preceded by Reuben T. Wood	Member of the U.S. House of Representatives from Missouri's 6th congressional district 1941–1942	Succeeded by Marion T. Bennett
