= Greene County Courthouse (Missouri) =

- U.S. National Register of Historic Places
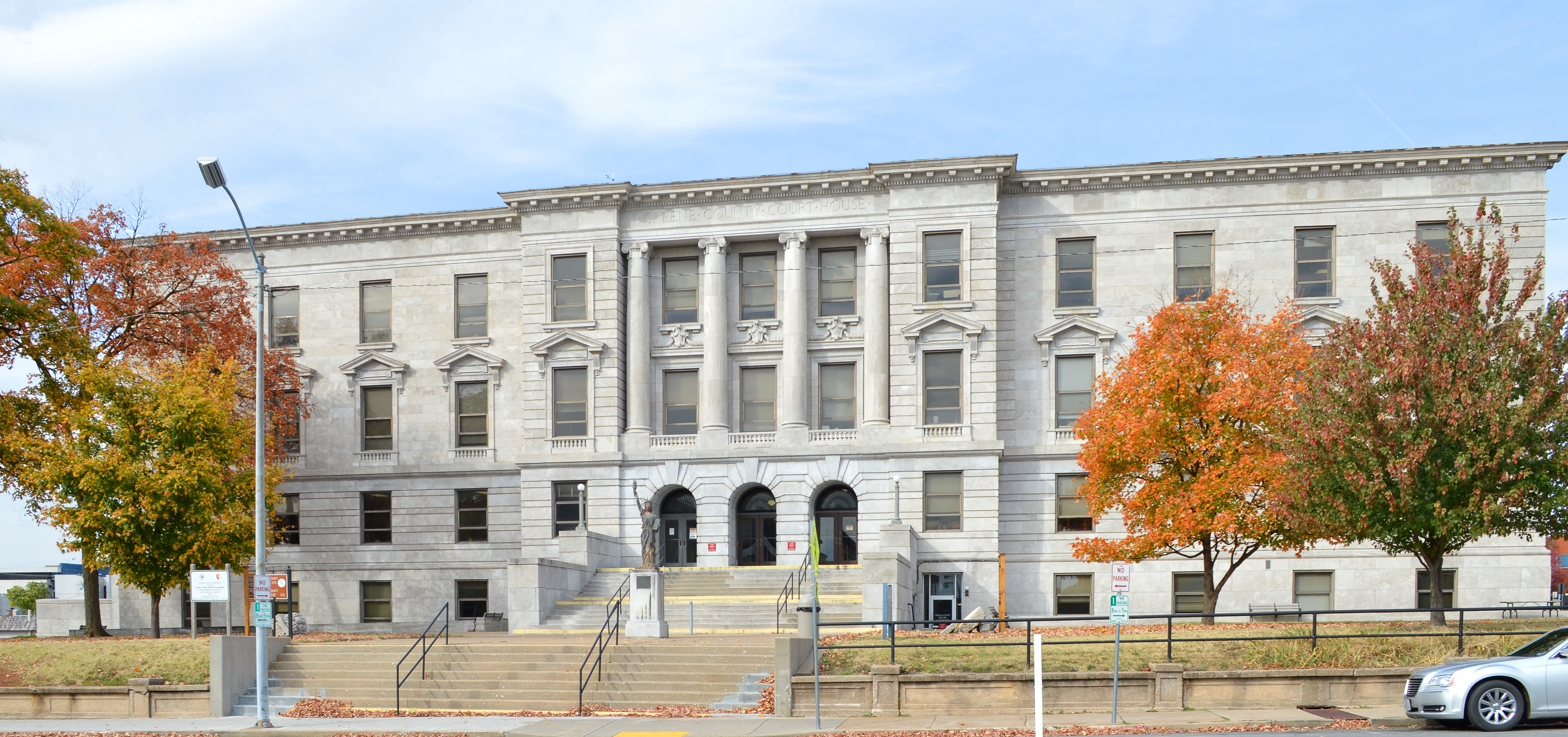
- Greene County Courthouse, October 2015

- Location within Missouri Location within the United States
- Location: 940 Boonville Ave., Springfield, Missouri
- Coordinates: 37°13′12″N 93°17′31″W
- Area: 1.5 acres (0.61 ha)
- Built: 1910-1912
- Built by: Hiram Lloyd Co.
- Architect: Miller, Opel & Torbit
- Architectural style: Classical Revival
- NRHP reference No.: 07001185
- Added to NRHP: November 14, 2007

Greene County Courthouse, also known as Historic Greene County Courthouse, is a historic courthouse located at Springfield, Greene County, Missouri. It was built between 1910 and 1912, and is a four-story, Classical Revival style rusticated stone building. It has a flat roof and low dome over a rotunda. The front facade features a free colonnade of four Ionic order columns that extend the height of the upper two floors. Also on the property are the contributing bronze replica of the Statue of Liberty, the stone bases of two columns from the former courthouse, and a World War I cannon. It was the seat of Greene County government until a new Judicial Courts Building and Justice Center were built in the 1990s.

It was listed on the National Register of Historic Places in 2007.
