= Sam Aaron Baker =

American politician (1874–1933)

Samuel A. Baker
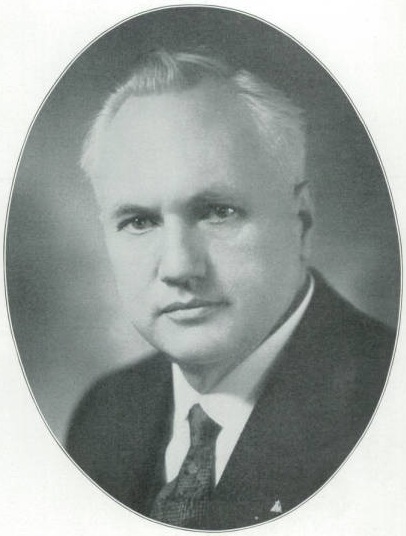

36th Governor of Missouri
- In office January 12, 1925 – January 14, 1929
- Lieutenant: Philip Allen Bennett
- Preceded by: Arthur M. Hyde
- Succeeded by: Henry S. Caulfield

Missouri Superintendent of Schools
- In office 1919–1923

Personal details
- Born: November 7, 1874 Patterson, Missouri, U.S.
- Died: September 16, 1933 (aged 58) Jefferson City, Missouri, U.S.
- Party: Republican
- Spouse: Nelle Rose Tuckley
- Children: One; Mary Elizabeth
- Education: Southeast Missouri State Teachers College; Missouri Wesleyan College
- Profession: Teacher, Politician

Samuel Aaron Baker (November 7, 1874 – September 16, 1933) was an American educator and Republican politician who served as the 36th governor of Missouri.

== Early life ==
Samuel A. Baker was born in Patterson, Missouri, an unincorporated community in Wayne County to Samuel Aaron and Mary Amanda (McGhee) Baker His father, a physician and Union Army Civil War veteran, died before young Sam was born. With the family struggling financially due to his father's death, Sam often had to work and at times attended school in Mill Spring, Missouri only sporadically. Nonetheless, he was determined to better himself in life through higher education. Baker worked as a sawmill assistant and as a railroad section hand until he had saved enough money to attend Southeast Missouri State Teachers College in Cape Girardeau, from which he earned a bachelor's degree in pedagogy. Later, while already working in the education field, Baker would earn a second bachelor's degree from Missouri Wesleyan College.

== Educator ==
Sam Baker held a variety of teaching, principal, and superintendent positions around the state in the years following his college graduation. His notable assignments included serving as principal at Jefferson City, Missouri in 1899 and Joplin, Missouri. After a three-year term as superintendent for Richmond, Missouri schools, Baker returned to Jefferson City as superintendent in 1913. While there he was instrumental in the issuing of a $100,000 bond passage that brought large improvements to the school district. Voters statewide took notice of his efforts as a reformer and elected Baker as Missouri's Superintendent of Public Schools in 1918. Baker served as the superintendent from 1919 to 1923. During his tenure Baker was successful in securing more funding for rural schools from the state legislature, increasing teacher training and salaries, and promoting more emphasis on vocational education. Despite these improvements Baker was defeated when running for reelection in 1922 as he was edged out by Democrat Charles A. Lee by just a few hundred votes.

== Governor ==
After his defeat in the 1922 election Sam Baker chose to continue in politics rather than in the education field. Republican incumbent governor Arthur Hyde, limited to one term by Missouri law at the time, endorsed Baker's candidacy to succeed him as governor in 1924. Baker defeated two other Republicans, including Missouri lieutenant governor Hiram Lloyd, in the August primary. In the November general election Baker defeated Democrat Arthur W. Nelson by less than six thousand votes to become Missouri's 36th governor.

As governor Baker continued to advocate changes and improvements for Missouri schools, including increased funding and redistricting to consolidate low-quality schools. However, the Missouri legislature, including many members of his own party, foiled Baker's efforts. Several leading Republicans were upset that Baker made political appointments based more on qualifications and friendship regardless of party instead of ones hand-picked by party leadership. Baker did have some areas of success however, including establishment of a Workers' compensation program, passage of a $75 million bond issue to improve the quality of Missouri roads, instituting banking reforms, and the development of Missouri state parks. One of the earliest parks, Sam A. Baker State Park in Wayne county, was named in the governors honor after his death.

== Death ==
Governor Baker suffered failing health during his final year in office, and shortly after leaving office in January 1929 he suffered two major strokes. Bedridden for his remaining years, Samuel A. Baker died from a cerebral hemorrhage on September 16, 1933. He is buried in Riverview Cemetery in Jefferson City, Missouri.

Party political offices
Preceded by Arthur M. Hyde	Republican nominee for Governor of Missouri; 1924	Succeeded by Henry S. Caulfield
Political offices
Preceded by Arthur M. Hyde	Governor of Missouri; 1925–1929	Succeeded by Henry S. Caulfield
