= Hiram Lloyd =

American politician

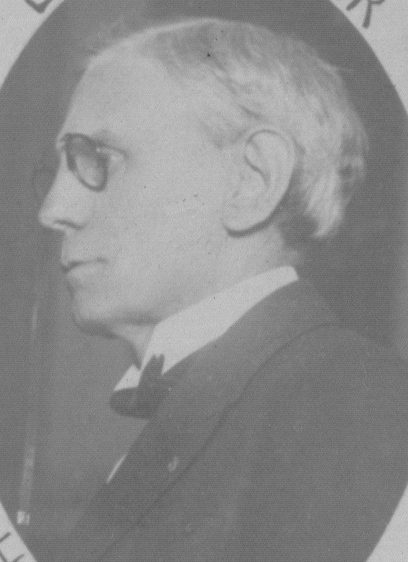
- Lloyd in 1921

30th Lieutenant Governor of Missouri
- In office January 10, 1921 – January 12, 1925
- Governor: Arthur M. Hyde
- Preceded by: Wallace Crossley
- Succeeded by: Philip A. Bennett

Personal details
- Born: July 23, 1863
- Died: September 10, 1942 (aged 79)
- Resting place: Green Mount Protestant Cemetery, Belleville, Illinois, U.S.
- Political party: Republican
- Spouse: Jane Ann Maitland (m. 1888; died 1919)
- Children: 3
- Parent(s): Thomas Lloyd; Hannah Pepper
- Profession: Politician, builder

Hiram Lloyd (July 23, 1863 – September 10, 1942) was an American builder and politician. He served as lieutenant governor of Missouri from 1921 to 1925.

== Early life ==
Lloyd's English parents, Thomas and Hannah (Pepper) Lloyd, came to the United States in 1860 and settled in St. Clair County, Illinois, where Thomas became the county inspector of mines. Hiram Lloyd was born on the family farm there in 1863, one of eleven children. His brother Henry Lloyd became a doctor and was at one time chief coroner of St. Louis.

Lloyd moved to St. Louis in 1879 to be a carpenter's apprentice. He worked as a carpenter until 1890, when he began working as an independent contractor. In 1903 he incorporated the Hiram Lloyd Building & Construction Company, which became a prominent contractor constructing private and public buildings in the Midwest, including several high schools in St. Louis, the East St. Louis custom house and post office, and many other public buildings. A newspaper article in 1924 claimed the company had constructed more than ten million dollars' worth of projects.

Lloyd was active in the Odd Fellows, serving as the Missouri Grand Master in 1903–4.

== Political career ==
Lloyd served from 1885 to 1889 in the lower house of the St. Louis Municipal Assembly, serving as speaker for the last two years. He served in various Republican party posts, including being a state Republican committeeman from 1900 to 1904. He was a 1908 Republican National Convention delegate. Lloyd was elected to the state legislature in 1908 and 1910 and served as House minority leader. In 1912 he was the Republican candidate for lieutenant governor and lost to Democrat William Rock Painter. He was elected lieutenant governor of Missouri in 1920 on a Republican ticket with governor Arthur M. Hyde, serving from January 10, 1921, to January 12, 1925. Older and more politically experienced than Hyde, Lloyd was influential in moving policies through the legislature and in the construction of state buildings. Lloyd then ran for the Republican nomination for governor in 1924, but came in a distant second to Superintendent of Schools Sam Aaron Baker in a three-way race.

== Family ==
Lloyd married English-born Jane Ann Maitland (1868 - 1919) on May 27, 1888. They had at least three sons, Thomas Henry (1889–1958), Hiram (died as an infant), Hiram Jr., and Weston Robert Lloyd.

After a fall at the home of his son Hiram Jr. on August 23, Lloyd was hospitalized and died of bronchial pneumonia. He is buried in Green Mount Protestant Cemetery in Belleville, Illinois.

== Partial list of Hiram Lloyd Building & Construction buildings ==
Notable buildings built, in part or in whole, by Hiram Lloyd Building & Construction include:

- McKinley High School (St. Louis, Missouri), St. Louis, 1904
- Yeatman High School (later Central High School), St. Louis, 1904
- Soldan High School, St. Louis, 1909
- Greene County Courthouse, Springfield, Missouri, 1910 - 1912
- Strong Hall (Lawrence, Kansas), 1911
- Washington Irving High School, Clarksburg, West Virginia, 1914
- Miles City Main Post Office, Miles City, Montana, 1916
- Post Office Fredericktown, Missouri, 1936

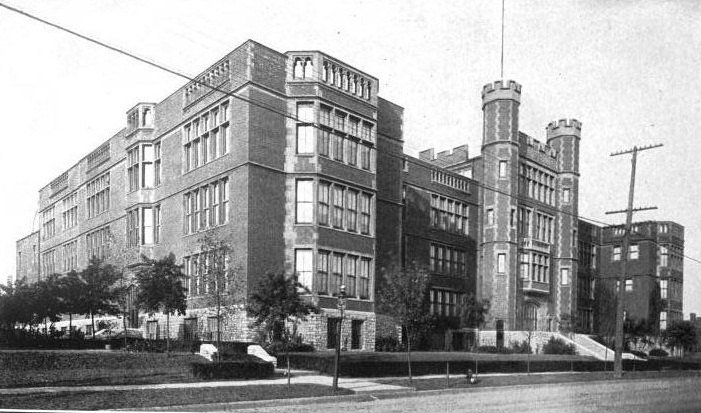
McKinley High School in 1910; constructed 1904 by Hiram Lloyd Building & Construction

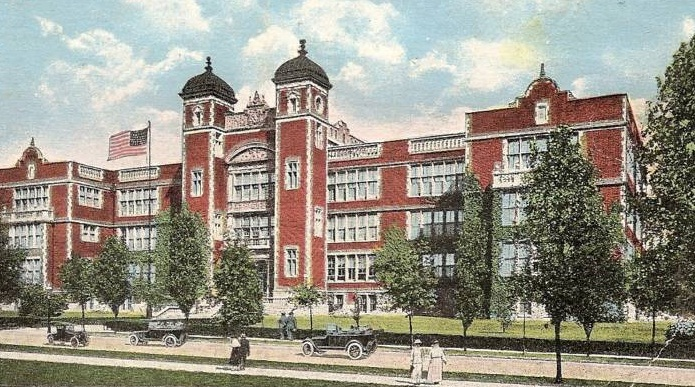
Yeatman High School, St. Louis, in 1918

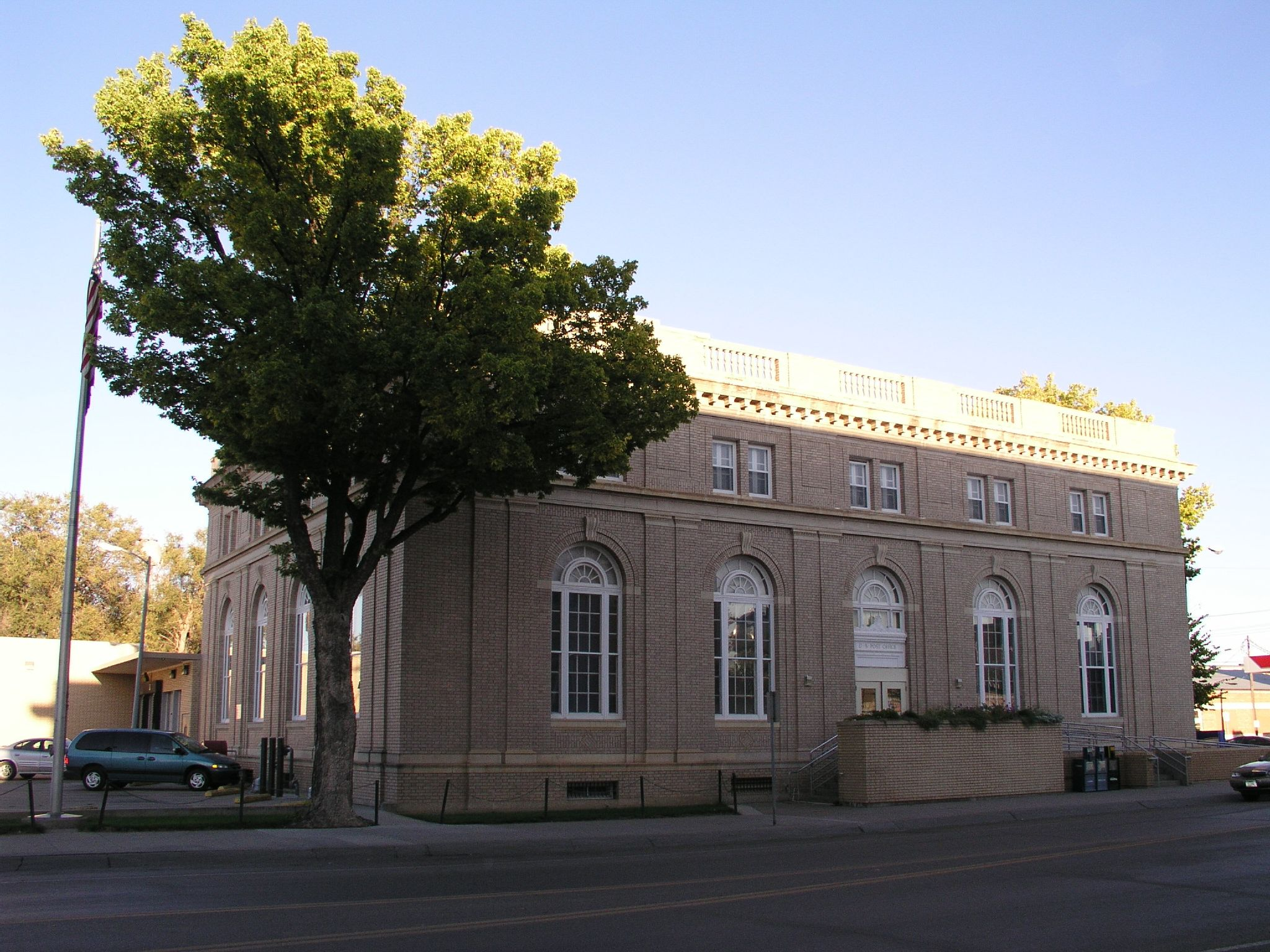
Miles City (Montana) post office; constructed 1916 by Hiram Lloyd Building & Construction

Party political offices
Preceded by Jacob F. Gmelich	Republican nominee for Lieutenant Governor of Missouri; 1912	Succeeded by Roy F. Britton
Preceded by Roy F. Britton	Republican nominee for Lieutenant Governor of Missouri; 1920	Succeeded by Philip Allen Bennett
Political offices
Preceded by Wallace Crossley	Lieutenant Governor of Missouri; 1921–1925	Succeeded by Philip Allen Bennett
