= David W. Stark =

American politician

David W. Stark (c. 1879 – 1940 or 1941) was an American politician. He was a member of the Missouri Legislature in the early 20th century. He was a farmer in West Line, Missouri.

== Political life ==
In November 1910, Stark was elected as a Democrat to the Cass County seat in the Missouri House of Representatives.

On Monday, May 20, 1911, the St. Louis Globe-Democrat printed a story headed "Drunken Democrats Turn Assembly Into a Sunday Debauch; Liquor-Fired Mob Breaks Up Senate Session; Carouse Is in Celebration of Game Warden." In it, the Globe said:

The Sunday session of the House terminated late in the afternoon in a fist fight and near riot. Kirby J. Smith of Ava, Missouri, a clerk in the office of Game Commissioner Tolerton . . . was assaulted upon the floor of the House by Representative David W. Stark of Cass County.

The St. Joseph News-Press reported that Stark "struck at" Smith and then "grasped him by the throat and pushed him, scrambling and fighting, to the rear of the hall. . . At last someone tripped Stark, and the two sprawled on the floor, and the other representatives" pulled Stark off.

Stark filed a suit against the Globe the next month, alleging libel and asking for $150,000 in damages. The newspaper paid him $2,500 to withdraw the suit.

Stark served two terms in Missouri's House of Representatives, and in 1916, he was elected to its Senate. He himself voted in Freeman, Missouri.

== Personal life ==
Stark's family lived in Cass County, Missouri, since the early 1850s.

A marriage license was issued to Stark and Martha Ingels of Jackson County on May 16, 1910. In 1917, the St. Louis Globe-Democrat reported that Stark was one of nine senators who "have their wives on the pay roll of the General Assembly as clerks or stenographers at $3.50 a day."

About 1921 or 1922, Stark became "mentally unbalanced" and was admitted as a private patient at the Nevada Hospital for the Insane. In 1928, his private funds having been exhausted, his expenses at the hospital were taken over by Cass County.

Dying in 1940 or 1941, the Missouri Senate held a memorial service for eight former senators, including Stark, who had died "since the last session of the General Assembly".
