= 1924 Wisconsin lieutenant gubernatorial election =

- November 4, 1924
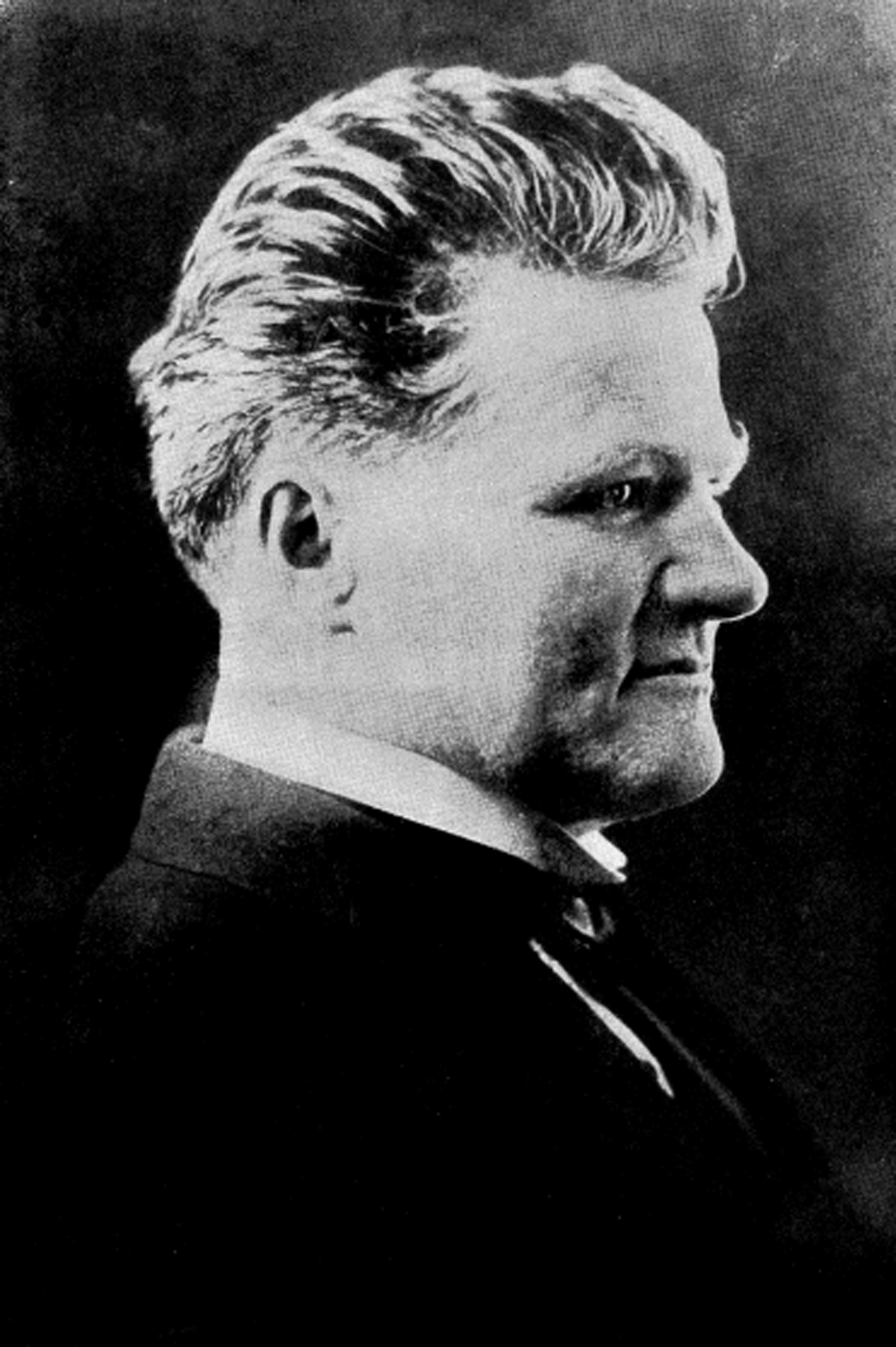

Nominee	Henry Huber	Karl Mathie	Peter Gilles
Party	Republican	Democratic	Social-Democratic
Popular vote	433,106	215,327	46,660
Percentage	60.27%	29.96%	6.49%
Lieutenant Governor before election
George Comings
Republican
Elected Lieutenant Governor
Henry Huber
Republican

The 1924 Wisconsin lieutenant gubernatorial election was held on November 4, 1924, in order to elect the lieutenant governor of Wisconsin. Republican nominee and incumbent member of the Wisconsin Senate Henry Huber defeated Democratic nominee Karl Mathie, Social-Democratic nominee Peter Gilles, Prohibition nominee Maria I. A. Nelson, Independent Republican nominee John E. Ferris, Independent Socialist Labor nominee Steve Fisher and Independent Workers nominee Charles Kuzdas.

== General election ==
On election day, November 4, 1924, Republican nominee Henry Huber won the election by a margin of 217,779 votes against his foremost opponent Democratic nominee Karl Mathie, thereby retaining Republican control over the office of lieutenant governor. Huber was sworn in as the 25th lieutenant governor of Wisconsin on January 5, 1925.

=== Results ===
Wisconsin lieutenant gubernatorial election, 1924
Party	Candidate	Votes	%
Republican	Henry Huber	433,106	60.27
Democratic	Karl Mathie	215,327	29.96
Social-Democratic	Peter Gilles	46,660	6.49
Prohibition	Maria I. A. Nelson	11,170	1.55
Independent Republican	John E. Ferris	8,301	1.16
Socialist Labor (Note: "Independent Socialist Labor")	Steve Fisher	2,025	0.28
Workers (Note: "Independent Workers Party of America")	Charles Kuzdas	1,978	0.28
	Scattering	102	0.01
Total votes		718,669	100.00
Republican hold			
