= Bellair, Missouri =

Extinct hamlet in Missouri, U.S.

Coordinates: 38°49′59″N 92°50′40″W

Bellair is an unincorporated community in Cooper County, Missouri, United States. The community is on Missouri Route 5, approximately ten miles south-southwest of Boonville.

== History ==
Bellair was founded in the 1840s by T. P. Airbell, and named for him. A post office called Bellair was established in 1849, then was changed to Bell Air in 1864, and the post office closed in 1906.
