= William Rock Painter =

American politician (1863–1947)

William R. Painter
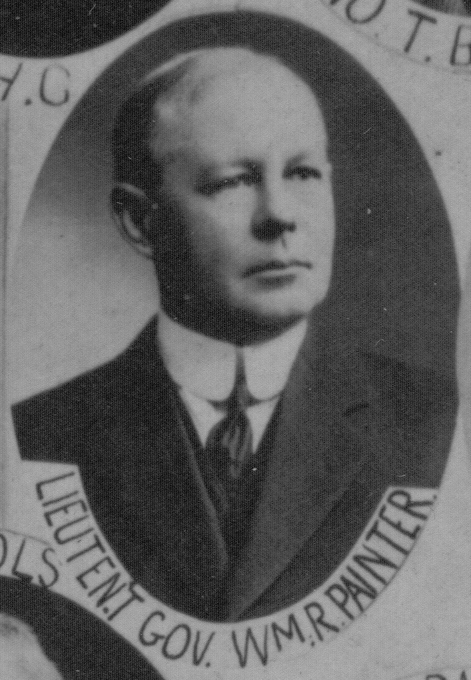

28th Lieutenant Governor of Missouri
- In office January 13, 1913 – January 8, 1917
- Governor: Elliot Woolfolk Major
- Preceded by: Jacob F. Gmelich
- Succeeded by: Wallace Crossley

Personal details
- Born: August 27, 1863 Carroll County, Missouri, U.S.
- Died: July 1, 1947 (aged 83) Carrollton, Missouri, U.S.
- Party: Democratic
- Profession: Civil Engineering; Journalism; Politics

William Rock Painter (August 27, 1863 – July 1, 1947) was an American politician. He was a Democrat politician from Missouri. He was the state's 28th Lieutenant Governor and later a State Senator.

== Personal history ==
William R. Painter was born in Carroll County, Missouri. He received his higher education at the Missouri School of Mines (now known as Missouri University of Science and Technology) and following graduation worked as a civil engineer. In 1894 Painter left the engineering field to become editor and publisher of the Daily and Weekly Democrat, newspaper in Carroll County. Painter married Cora Herndon January 12, 1888. They had three daughters and two sons. Painter died in July 1947 and is buried in Oak Hill Cemetery, Carrollton, Missouri.

== Political history ==
William R. Painter was elected Missouri Lieutenant Governor in November 1912, and served in that office from January 1913 to January 1917. Soon after leaving office, he was appointed as chairman of the (Missouri) Prison Board in 1917. and even served as prison warden for a period of nearly ten months in 1917. Painter finished his political career as state Senator from the Missouri 8th District, a position he held until 1930.

Party political offices
| Preceded by Thomas L. Rubey | Democratic nominee for Lieutenant Governor of Missouri; 1908, 1912 | Succeeded by Wallace Crossley |
Political offices
| Preceded by Jacob F. Gmelich | Lieutenant Governor of Missouri; 1913–1917 | Succeeded by Wallace Crossley |
