= Carter M. Buford =

American politician

- Carter M. Buford as he appeared in 1910, early in his political career.
- Born: March 3, 1876; Barnesville, Missouri, U.S.
- Died: June 30, 1959 (aged 83); Ellington, Missouri, U.S.

Carter Martin Buford (1876–1959) was an American educator, attorney, and Democratic politician in the state of Missouri. A six-term member of the Missouri State Senate, Buford is best remembered as the sponsor of legislation establishing a network of rural public schools throughout the state during the first decade of the 20th century.

Buford was twice a candidate for Missouri Lieutenant Governor but failed to win election to this statewide office.

== Early years ==
Carter Martin Buford was born March 3, 1876, in Barnesville, Missouri (today known as Ellington) to the former America Moore(d.1915), and her farmer husband, Abraham (Abe) Buford (d.1912). His paternal ancestry could be traced to Revolutionary War officer Abraham Buford, who moved to Kentucky, and his grandfather John Buford had become the first white settler of Reynolds County, Missouri when he settled there with his wife. Carter Buford attended the local public schools. After graduation Buford attended Cape Girardeau Normal School, known today as Southeast Missouri State University.

Following his time in college, Buford taught in local schools for a time before winning election as Commissioner of Schools for Reynolds County in 1897.

Buford later studied law, gaining admittance to the Missouri Bar in 1905. He then began a private legal practice in his home town of Ellington.

He would move away from the school system two years later, assuming the position of Reynolds County Recorder—a position which he would retain until his election to the Missouri State Senate in 1906.

=== Political career ===
Missouri State Senator Carter M. Buford as he appeared in 1919.

Buford first successfully ran outside his home county as a Democrat for the Missouri Senate in November 1906. His 24th Missouri Senate District also encompassed parts of Reynolds, Phelps, Washington, Dent, Iron, and Crawford counties.

He won re-election to a second 4-year term in November 1910 by a substantial majority—one of 13 Democratic senators elected out of 18 contested seats. These joined 11 Democratic holdovers not up for election, constituting a substantial majority of the 34 seat body. Buford began to rise in the ranks during this second term of office, emerging as floor leader for the Democratic caucus.

Among Buford's early legislative achievements was the introduction of a school district consolidation bill which enabled the establishment of a network of free rural high schools in 1913. Prior to the passage of this bill, rural Missouri children faced being transported sometimes significant distances to public schools located in urban centers or the paying of tuition at various rural "academies" located around the state.

Buford won a third term of office in the 24th Senate District in November 1914. Shortly after the election Buford was one of three senators named to the state's Auditing Committee by Democratic Governor Elliott W. Major—a committee which he chaired. The committee was responsible for checking and verifying the physical bonds and securities held by the government of Missouri in bank vaults around the state.

When the new legislature assembled in Jefferson City, Buford had gathered sufficient votes to win election by the Democratic caucus as President Pro Tem of the Senate—the top leadership position of the majority party. He would retain this position for the duration of the 48th legislative session but would not be returned as President Pro Tem for the 49th session in 1917.

Buford was re-elected for a fourth term in November 1918, but soon experienced his first electoral losses as he ran for statewide office. In the session of the assembly which followed, Buford served as chair of the Elections Committee and was a member of the powerful Appropriations Committee. In 1920 Buford unsuccessfully ran for Lieutenant Governor of Missouri but lost in a Republican landslide. In 1824 he again won the Democratic nomination for lieutenant governor and again lost.

Buford left the Missouri Senate in 1922 at the conclusion of his 1918 term, returning to full-time legal practice. He was again returned to Springfield by the Democratic Party in September 1926, however, following the death in office of his successor, Senator Frank Farris. Buford was chosen as a compromise candidate when the Democratic Committee in the district became hopelessly deadlocked between two candidates and were unable to come to a decision after 167 ballots.

He ran again in the 24th Senate District when the seat again was contested in November 1926, winning his fifth term in Springfield. A sixth and final 4-year term was won in November 1930.

=== Later years ===
Buford continued to be a leading influence in Missouri state politics until his retirement in 1934.

=== Death and legacy ===
Carter M. Buford died in the evening of June 30, 1959, at his home in Ellington. He was 83 years old at the time of his death.

== Footnotes ==
Party political offices
Preceded by Wallace Crossley	Democratic nominee for Lieutenant Governor of Missouri; 1920, 1924	Succeeded by Frank Gaines Harris
