= 1924 Soviet Union legislative election =

Legislative elections were held in the Soviet Union in 1924 to elect members of the Congress of Soviets. Some of the citizenry were not enthusiastic about elections in rural areas held the same year, for a number of varied reasons, possibly including reduced faith in the Soviets, which would increase in later years. However, voter turnout amongst women was very high.

The elections were noteworthy for a number of reasons: Joseph Stalin rose to more prominence this year after Vladimir Lenin died, revealing his idea of "socialism in one country" and increasing criticism of Trotskyists within the Soviet Union as its relations with Western countries, like the United Kingdom varied.
