= 1924 Connecticut lieutenant gubernatorial election =

- November 4, 1924
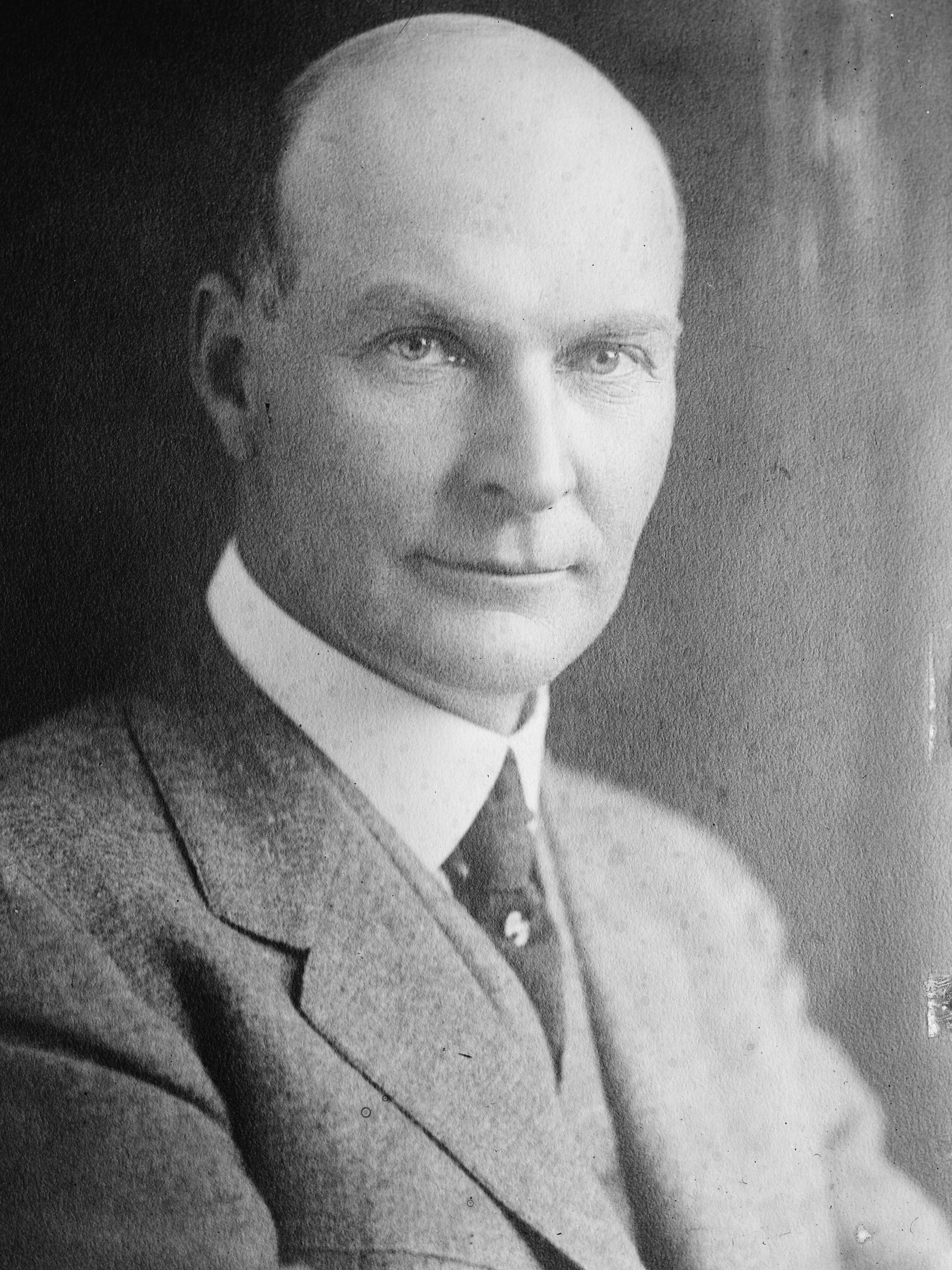

Nominee	John H. Trumbull	Harry L. Brooks
Party	Republican	Democratic
Popular vote	246,949	117,648
Percentage	67.70%	32.30%
Lieutenant Governor before election
Hiram Bingham III
Republican
Elected Lieutenant Governor
John H. Trumbull
Republican

The 1924 Connecticut lieutenant gubernatorial election was held on November 4, 1924, to elect the lieutenant governor of Connecticut. Republican nominee and incumbent President pro tempore of the Connecticut Senate John H. Trumbull won the election against Democratic nominee Harry L. Brooks.

== General election ==
On election day, November 4, 1924, Republican nominee John H. Trumbull won the election with 67.70% of the vote, thereby retaining Republican control over the office of lieutenant governor. Trumbull was sworn in as the 79th lieutenant governor of Connecticut on January 7, 1925, but would only serve for a single day as former lieutenant governor Hiram Bingham III was elected both governor and U.S. Senator for Connecticut and thus resigned as governor after a single day to take up his seat in the U.S. Senate, leading Trumbull to succeed Bingham as governor and incumbent President pro tempore of the Connecticut Senate J. Edwin Brainard to succeed Trumbull as lieutenant governor.

=== Results ===
Connecticut lieutenant gubernatorial election, 1924
Party	Candidate	Votes	%
Republican	John H. Trumbull	246,949	67.70
Democratic	Harry L. Brooks	117,648	32.30
Total votes		364,597	100.00
Republican hold			
