= 1924 Danish Landsting election =

Landsting elections were held in Denmark on 23 September 1924, with the exception that the electors were elected on 18 September.

Of the seven constituencies the seats representing constituencies number one (Copenhagen), four (Odense and Svendborg County) and six (Hjørring, Aalborg, Thisted, Viborg and Randers County) were up for election.

== Results ==
Party	Votes	%	Seats			
Party	Votes	%	Won	Not up (Note: Including the 19 members appointed by parliament.)	Total	+/–
Social Democratic Party	169,919	40.90	12	13	25	+3
Venstre	99,031	23.83	8	23	31	–2
Conservative People's Party	98,602	23.73	5	7	12	–1
Danish Social Liberal Party	44,733	10.77	3	5	8	0
Other parties	3,209	0.77	0	0	0	0
Total	415,494	100.00	28	48	76	0
Source: Wendt, Nordengaard
