= 1924 Missouri gubernatorial election =

- November 4, 1924
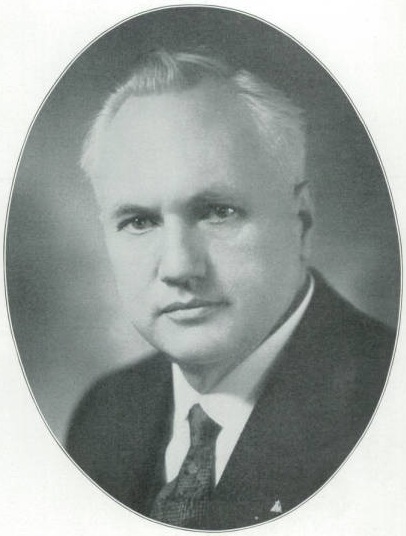

Nominee	Sam Aaron Baker	Arthur Nelson
Party	Republican	Democratic
Popular vote	640,135	634,263
Percentage	49.39%	48.94%
- County results Baker: 40–50% 50–60% 60–70% 70–80% 80–90% Nelson: 40–50% 50–60% 60–70% 70–80% 80–90%
Governor before election
Arthur M. Hyde
Republican
Elected Governor
Sam Aaron Baker
Republican

The 1924 Missouri gubernatorial election was held on November 4, 1924, and resulted in a narrow victory for the Republican nominee, former Missouri Superintendent of Schools Sam Aaron Baker, over the Democratic candidate, Arthur W. Nelson, Socialist candidate William M. Brandt, and Socialist Labor nominee William Wesley Cox. Baker had defeated lieutenant governor Hiram Lloyd and Victor J. Miller for the Republican nomination.

== Results ==
1924 gubernatorial election, Missouri
Party	Candidate	Votes	%	±%
Republican	Sam Aaron Baker	640,135	49.39	−4.86
Democratic	Arthur W. Nelson	634,263	48.94	+5.30
Socialist	William M. Brandt	21,043	1.62	+0.16
Socialist Labor	William Wesley Cox	678	0.05	−0.07
Majority		5,872	0.45	−10.17
Turnout		1,296,119	38.08	−1.02
Republican hold		Swing		
