= Electoral history of Harry S. Truman =

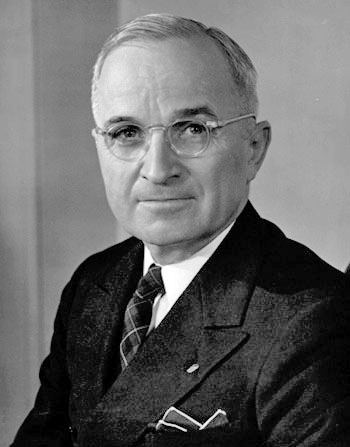
President Harry S. Truman, 1945

Harry S. Truman, the 33rd president of the United States, ran for public office several times. Before becoming president, he was the 34th vice president (1945) under Franklin D. Roosevelt, and as a United States senator from Missouri (1935–1945) prior to that.

== Jackson County judge elections, 1922-1930 ==
Before 1934, Truman ran four times for various administrative judgeships in Jackson County, Missouri.

1922 Eastern Judge of Jackson County Democratic primary
Party	Candidate	Votes	%
Democratic	Harry S. Truman	4,320	35.63
Democratic	E. E. Montgomery	3,951	33.28
Democratic	T. W. Parrent	2,172	18.30
Democratic	George W. Shaw	1,437	12.11
Democratic	James V. Compton	81	0.68
Total votes		11,961	100.00

1922 Eastern Judge of Jackson County election
Party	Candidate	Votes	%
Democratic	Harry S. Truman	8,634	57.36
Republican	Arthur L. Wilson	6,417	42.64
Total votes		15,051	100.00
Democratic hold			

1924 Eastern Judge of Jackson County Democratic primary
Party	Candidate	Votes	%
Democratic	Harry S. Truman (incumbent)	6,757	56.90
Democratic	Robert Lee Hood	5,119	43.10
Total votes		11,876	100.00

1924 Eastern Judge of Jackson County election
Party	Candidate	Votes	%
Republican	Henry W. Rummel	12,055	51.86
Democratic	Harry S. Truman (incumbent)	11,191	48.14
Total votes		23,246	100.00
Republican gain from Democratic			

1926 Presiding Judge of Jackson County Democratic primary
Party	Candidate	Votes	%
Democratic	Harry S. Truman	32,172	100.00
Total votes		32,172	100.00

1926 Presiding Judge of Jackson County election
Party	Candidate	Votes	%
Democratic	Harry S. Truman	77,680	55.83
Republican	Dan G. Stewart	61,466	44.17
Total votes		139,146	100.00
Democratic hold			

1930 Presiding Judge of Jackson County Democratic primary
Party	Candidate	Votes	%
Democratic	Harry S. Truman (incumbent)	Unopposed	100.00
Total votes			100.00

1930 Presiding Judge of Jackson County election
Party	Candidate	Votes	%
Democratic	Harry S. Truman (incumbent)	108,778	68.20 (Note: ourcampaigns.com says this is 68.18 percent, but more likely somewhere inbetween 68.175 and 68.1775 percent considering it says the margin is 36.35, not 36.36 - unfortunately the election page itself on ourcampaigns.com is not archived, so I can only see it from the archived page about Harry S. Truman)
Republican	Herman W. Ritterhoff	50,719	31.80 (Note: ourcampaigns.com says this is 31.82 percent, but more likely somewhere inbetween 31.8225 and 31.825 percent considering it says the margin is 36.35, not 36.36 - unfortunately the election page itself on ourcampaigns.com is not archived, so I can only see it from the archived page about Harry S. Truman)
Total votes		159,497	100.00
Democratic hold			

== United States Senate races, 1934-1940 ==
Democratic primary for the United States Senate from Missouri, 1934:

- Harry S. Truman - 276,850 (41.42%)
- John J. Cochran - 236,257 (35.35%)
- Jacob L. Milligan - 147,631 (22.09%)
- James Longstreet Cleveland - 7,691 (1.15%)

Missouri United States Senate election, 1934:

- Harry S. Truman (D) - 787,110 (59.55%)
- Roscoe C. Patterson (R) (inc.) - 524,954 (39.71%)
- W.C. Meyer (Socialist) - 9,010 (0.68%)
- Frank Brown (Communist) - 418 (0.03%)
- William Wesley Cox (Socialist Labor) - 384 (0.03%)

Democratic primary for the United States Senate from Missouri, 1940:

- Harry S. Truman (inc.) - 268,354 (40.91%)
- Lloyd Stark - 260,221 (39.67%)
- Maurice M. Milligan - 127,378 (19.42%)

Missouri United States Senate election, 1940:

- Harry S. Truman (D) (inc.) - 930,775 (51.17%)
- Manvel H. Davis (R) - 886,376 (48.73%)
- W. F. Rinck (Socialist) - 1,669 (0.09%)
- Theodore Baeff (Socialist Labor) - 196 (0.01%)

== Vice presidential races, 1944 ==
1944 Democratic National Convention (Vice Presidential tally):

1st ballot:

- Henry A. Wallace (inc.) - 429.5
- Harry S. Truman - 319.5
- John H. Bankhead II - 98
- Scott W. Lucas - 61
- Alben W. Barkley - 49.5
- J. Melville Broughton - 43
- Paul V. McNutt - 31
- Joseph C. O'Mahoney - 27
- Prentice Cooper - 26
- Robert S. Kerr - 23
- Scattering - 68.5

2nd ballot before shifts:

- Harry S. Truman - 477.5
- Henry A. Wallace (inc.) - 473
- Scott W. Lucas - 58
- Alben W. Barkley - 40
- J. Melville Broughton - 30
- Paul V. McNutt - 28
- Prentice Cooper - 26
- John H. Bankhead II - 23.5
- Joseph C. O'Mahoney - 8
- Robert S. Kerr - 1
- Scattering - 11

2nd ballot after shifts:

- Harry S. Truman - 1,031
- Henry A. Wallace - 105
- Prentice Cooper - 26
- Alben W. Barkley - 6
- Paul V. McNutt - 1
- Scatering - 7

1944 United States presidential election:

- Franklin D. Roosevelt/Harry S. Truman (D) - 25,612,916 (53.4%) and 432 electoral votes (81.36%, 36 states carried)
- Thomas E. Dewey/John W. Bricker (R) - 22,017,929 (45.9%) and 99 electoral votes (18.64%, 12 states carried)
- Texas Regulars - 135,439 (0.3%)
- Norman Thomas/Darlington Hoopes (Socialist) - 79,017 (0.2%)
- Claude Watson/Andrew Johnson (Prohibition) - 74,758 (0.2%)
- Others - 57,004 (0.1%)

== Presidential races, 1948-1952 ==
1948 Democratic presidential primaries:

- Harry S. Truman (inc.) - 1,419,875 (64.65%)
- William Alexander Julian - 271,146 (12.35%)
- Unpledged delegates - 161,629 (7.36%)
- Harley M. Kilgore - 157,102 (7.15%)
- W. B. Bixler - 136,401 (6.21%)
- Lynn Fellows - 11,193 (0.51%)
- Fred H. Hildebrandt - 8,016 (0.37%)
- Dwight D. Eisenhower - 6,211 (0.28%)
- Henry A. Wallace - 4,416 (0.20%)

1948 Democratic National Convention (Presidential tally):

- Harry S. Truman (inc.) - 926 (76.47%)
- Richard B. Russell - 266 (21.97%)
- James A. Roe - 15 (1.24%)
- Paul V. McNutt - 3 (0.25%)
- Alben W. Barkley - 1 (0.08%)

1948 United States presidential election:

- Harry S. Truman/Alben W. Barkley (D) - 24,179,347 (49.6%) and 303 electoral votes (57.06%, 28 states carried)
- Thomas E. Dewey/Earl Warren (R) - 21,991,292 (45.1%) and 189 electoral votes (35.59%, 16 states carried)
- Strom Thurmond/Fielding L. Wright (Dixiecrat) - 1,175,930 (2.4%) and 39 electoral votes (7.35%, 4 states carried)
- Henry A. Wallace/Glen H. Taylor (Progressive) - 1,157,328 (2.4%)
- Norman Thomas/Tucker P. Smith (Socialist) - 139,569 (0.3%)
- Claude Watson/Dale Learn (Prohibition) - 103,708 (0.2%)
- Others - 46,361 (0.1%)

1952 Democratic New Hampshire primary:

- Estes Kefauver - 19,800 (55.01%)
- Harry S. Truman (inc.) - 15,927 (44.25%)
- Douglas MacArthur - 151 (0.42%)
- Jim Farley - 77 (0.21%)
- Adlai Stevenson II - 40 (0.11%)

1952 Democratic presidential primaries:

- Estes Kefauver - 3,169,448 (65.04%)
- Pat Brown - 485,578 (9.97%)
- Richard B. Russell - 371,179 (7.62%)
- Matthew M. Neely - 191,471 (3.93%)
- Robert J. Bulkley - 184,880 (3.79%)
- Hubert Humphrey - 102,527 (2.10%)
- Adlai Stevenson II - 81,096 (1.66%)
- Dwight D. Eisenhower - 64,911 (1.33%)
- Harry S. Truman (inc.) - 62,345 (1.28%)
- Unpledged delegates - 46,361 (0.95%)
- Robert S. Kerr - 45,285 (0.93%)
- William O. Douglas - 29,532 (0.61%)
- W. Averell Harriman - 19,806 (0.41%)
- Jerome F. Fox - 18,322 (0.38%)

1952 Democratic National Convention (Presidential tally):

Most votes received by candidates for party presidential nomination, up to the point where a nominee was determined. Vote totals are rounded up to the next whole number.

- Adlai Stevenson II - 618 (37.36%)
- Estes Kefauver - 363 (21.95%)
- Richard B. Russell - 294 (17.78%)
- W. Averell Harriman - 124 (7.50%)
- Alben W. Barkley - 79 (4.78%)
- Robert S. Kerr - 65 (3.93%)
- Paul A. Dever - 38 (2.30%)
- Hubert Humphrey - 26 (1.57%)
- J. William Fulbright - 22 (1.33%)
- James E. Murray - 12 (0.73%)
- Harry S. Truman (inc.) - 6 (0.36%)
- Oscar R. Ewing - 4 (0.24%)
- Paul H. Douglas - 2 (0.12%)
- William O. Douglas - 1 (0.06%)
