= 1944 Missouri lieutenant gubernatorial election =

- November 7, 1944
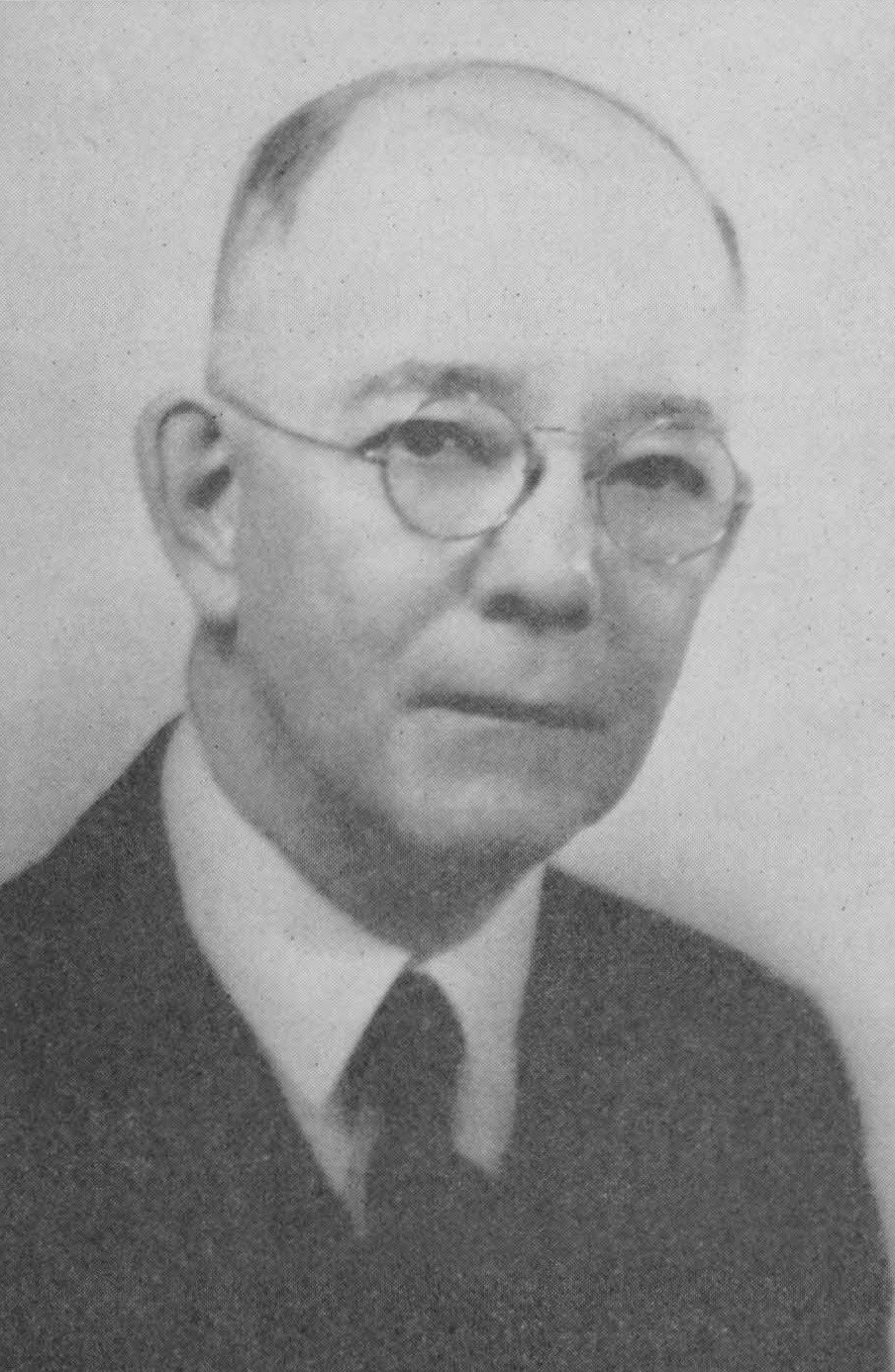

| Nominee | Walter Naylor Davis | James G. Blaine |
| Party | Democratic | Republican |
| Popular vote | 789,517 | 761,568 |
| Percentage | 50.85% | 49.05% |
Lieutenant Governor before election
Frank Gaines Harris
Democratic
Elected Lieutenant Governor
Walter Naylor Davis
Democratic

The 1944 Missouri lieutenant gubernatorial election was held on November 7, 1944. Democratic nominee Walter Naylor Davis defeated Republican nominee James G. Blaine with 50.85% of the vote.

== Primary elections ==
Primary elections were held on August 1, 1944.

=== Democratic primary ===
==== Candidates ====
- Walter Naylor Davis, attorney
- Dan D. Porter
- David B. Russell
- Cullen S. Duncan, State Senator
- Redmond S. Brennan

==== Results ====
Democratic primary results
| Party | Candidate | Votes | % |
|---|---|---|---|
| Democratic | Walter Naylor Davis | 97,692 | 31.78 |
| Democratic | Dan D. Porter | 72,488 | 23.58 |
| Democratic | David B. Russell | 50,273 | 16.35 |
| Democratic | Cullen S. Duncan | 47,158 | 15.34 |
| Democratic | Redmond S. Brennan | 39,799 | 12.95 |
| Total votes | | 307,410 | 100.00 |

=== Republican primary ===
==== Candidates ====
- James G. Blaine
- Joseph T. Tate
- Orland K. Armstrong, State Representative
- Claude L. Lambert
- H. B. Hart, State Senator
- Edwin A. Duensing
- Aaron J. Rehkop, former State Senator

==== Results ====
Republican primary results
| Party | Candidate | Votes | % |
|---|---|---|---|
| Republican | James G. Blaine | 83,483 | 28.98 |
| Republican | Joseph T. Tate | 56,178 | 19.50 |
| Republican | Orland K. Armstrong | 51,825 | 17.99 |
| Republican | Claude L. Lambert | 33,513 | 11.63 |
| Republican | H. B. Hart | 29,306 | 10.17 |
| Republican | Edwin A. Duensing | 24,218 | 8.41 |
| Republican | Aaron J. Rehkop | 9,540 | 3.31 |
| Total votes | | 288,063 | 100.00 |

== General election ==
=== Candidates ===
Major party candidates

- Walter Naylor Davis, Democratic
- James G. Blaine, Republican

Other candidates

- Edith F. Stevens, Socialist
- Michael L. Hiltner, Socialist Labor

=== Results ===
1944 Missouri lieutenant gubernatorial election
| Party | Candidate | Votes | % | ±% |
|---|---|---|---|---|
| Democratic | Walter Naylor Davis | 789,517 | 50.85% | |
| Republican | James G. Blaine | 761,568 | 49.05% | |
| Socialist | Edith F. Stevens | 1,255 | 0.08% | |
| Socialist Labor | Michael L. Hiltner | 217 | 0.01% | |
| Majority | | 27,949 | | |
| Turnout | | | | |
| Democratic hold | | Swing | | |
