= 1932 Missouri lieutenant gubernatorial election =

- November 8, 1932
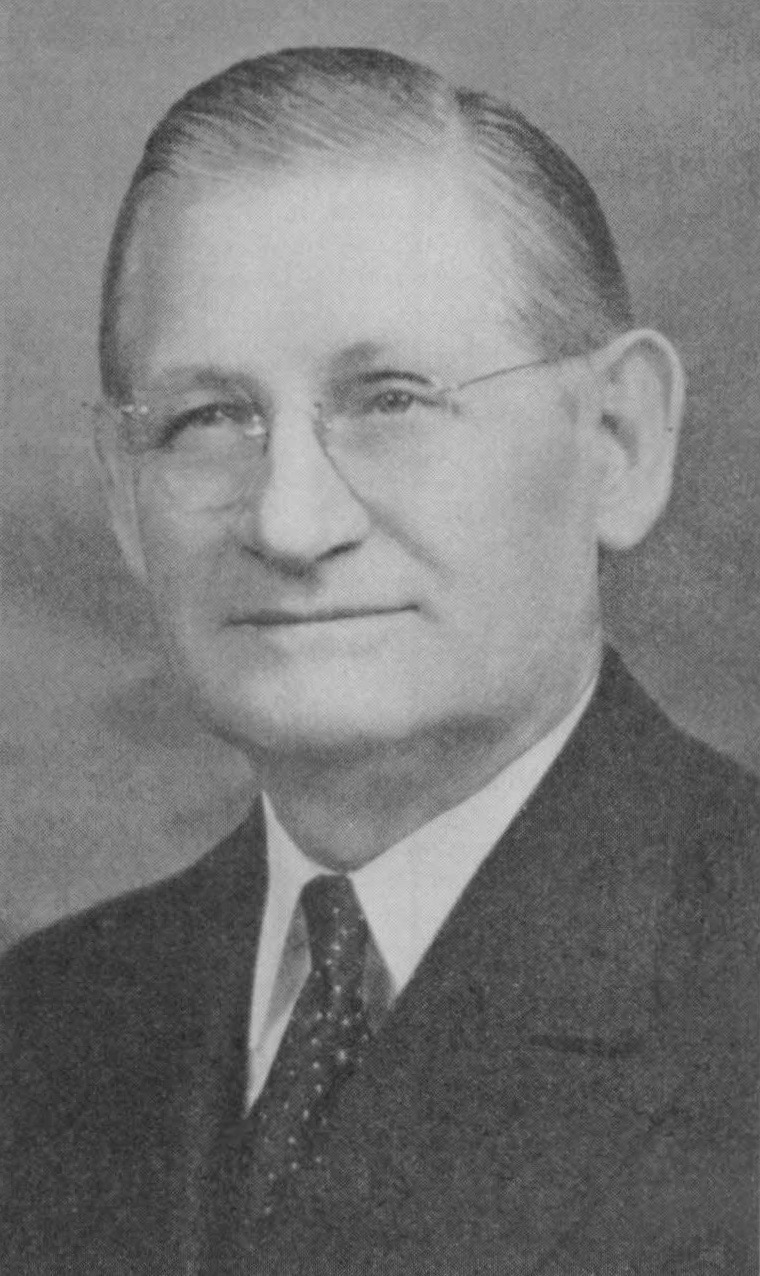

Nominee	Frank Gaines Harris	James J. Barrett
Party	Democratic	Republican
Popular vote	1,000,891	597,413
Percentage	62.13%	37.08%
Lieutenant Governor before election
Edward Henry Winter
Republican
Elected Lieutenant Governor
Frank Gaines Harris
Democratic

The 1932 Missouri lieutenant gubernatorial election was held on November 8, 1932. Democratic nominee Frank Gaines Harris defeated Republican nominee James J. Barrett with 62.13% of the vote.

== Primary elections ==
Primary elections were held on August 2, 1932.

=== Democratic primary ===
==== Candidates ====
- Frank Gaines Harris, former State Senator
- Floyd Sperry
- Alvin O'Connor
- Fred M. Harris

==== Results ====
Democratic primary results
Party	Candidate	Votes	%
Democratic	Frank Gaines Harris	280,771	47.83
Democratic	Floyd Sperry	166,503	28.36
Democratic	Alvin O'Connor	72,391	12.33
Democratic	Fred M. Harris	67,373	11.48
Total votes		587,038	100.00

=== Republican primary ===
==== Candidates ====
- James J. Barrett
- J. Grant Frye
- David P. Janes
- Keith McCanse
- Louis E. Trieseler

==== Results ====
Republican primary results
Party	Candidate	Votes	%
Republican	James J. Barrett	89,196	26.81
Republican	J. Grant Frye	70,404	21.16
Republican	David P. Janes	63,937	19.22
Republican	Keith McCanse	62,675	18.84
Republican	Louis E. Trieseler	46,520	13.98
Total votes		332,732	100.00

== General election ==
=== Candidates ===
Major party candidates

- Frank Gaines Harris, Democratic
- James J. Barrett, Republican

Other candidates

- George C. Grant, Socialist
- Monroe Jones, Communist
- Theodore Baeff, Socialist Labor

=== Results ===
1932 Missouri lieutenant gubernatorial election
Party	Candidate	Votes	%	±%
Democratic	Frank Gaines Harris	1,000,891	62.13%	
Republican	James J. Barrett	597,413	37.08%	
Socialist	George C. Grant	11,797	0.73%	
Communist	Monroe Jones	529	0.03%	
Socialist Labor	Theodore Baeff	421	0.03%	
Majority		403,478		
Turnout				
Democratic gain from Republican		Swing		
