= 1928 Missouri lieutenant gubernatorial election =

- November 6, 1928
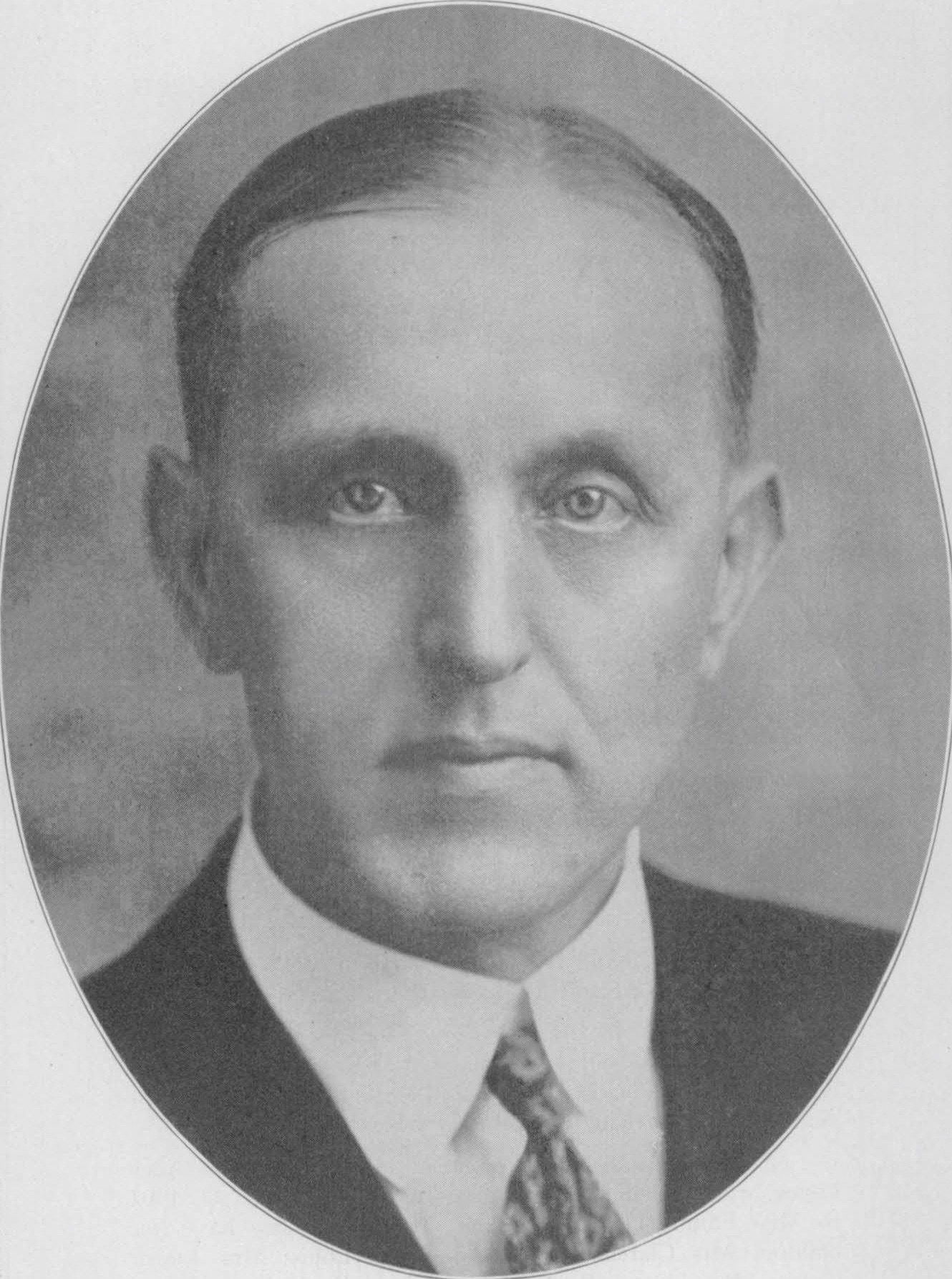

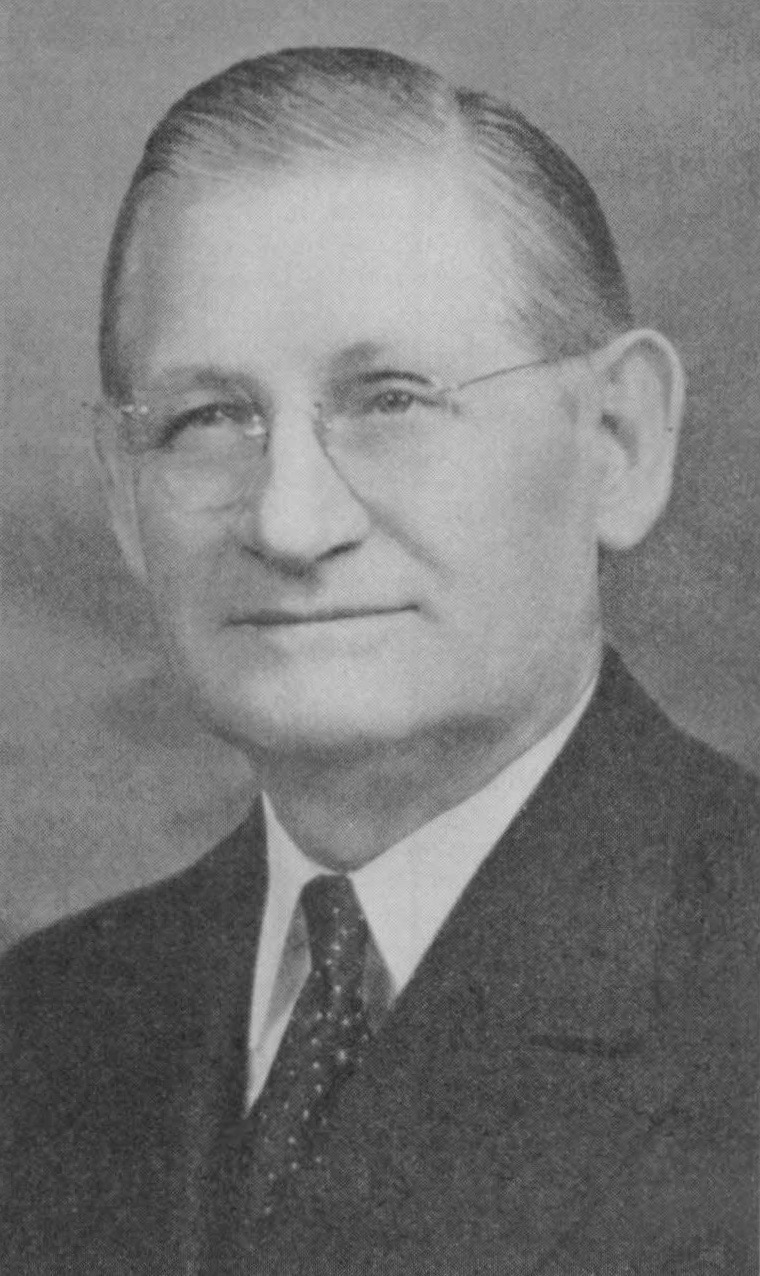
Nominee	Edward Henry Winter	Frank Gaines Harris
Party	Republican	Democratic
Popular vote	795,766	718,226
Percentage	52.47%	47.36%
Lieutenant Governor before election
Philip Allen Bennett
Republican
Elected Lieutenant Governor
Edward Henry Winter
Republican

The 1928 Missouri lieutenant gubernatorial election was held on November 6, 1928. Republican nominee Edward Henry Winter defeated Democratic nominee Frank Gaines Harris with 52.47% of the vote.

== Primary elections ==
Primary elections were held on August 7, 1928.

=== Democratic primary ===
==== Candidates ====
- Frank Gaines Harris, State Senator
- N. W. Brickey
- Samuel Rosenfeld
- Charles Arthur Anderson, attorney
- Clyde W. Wagner
- John T. Baird
- Otto W. Hammer

==== Results ====
Democratic primary results
Party	Candidate	Votes	%
Democratic	Frank Gaines Harris	102,261	31.88
Democratic	N. W. Brickey	85,003	26.50
Democratic	Samuel Rosenfeld	35,875	11.18
Democratic	Charles Arthur Anderson	32,363	10.09
Democratic	Clyde W. Wagner	24,715	7.71
Democratic	John T. Baird	21,635	6.75
Democratic	Otto W. Hammer	18,916	5.90
Total votes		320,768	100.00

== General election ==
=== Candidates ===
Major party candidates

- Edward Henry Winter, Republican
- Frank Gaines Harris, Democratic

Other candidates

- Frank J. Offenburger, Socialist
- Karl Oberheu, Socialist Labor

=== Results ===
1928 Missouri lieutenant gubernatorial election
Party	Candidate	Votes	%	±%
Republican	Edward Henry Winter	795,766	52.47%	
Democratic	Frank Gaines Harris	718,226	47.36%	
Socialist	Frank J. Offenburger	2,436	0.16%	
Socialist Labor	Karl Oberheu	257	0.02%	
Majority		77,540		
Turnout				
Republican hold		Swing		
