= 1928 United States Senate election in Missouri =

- November 6, 1928
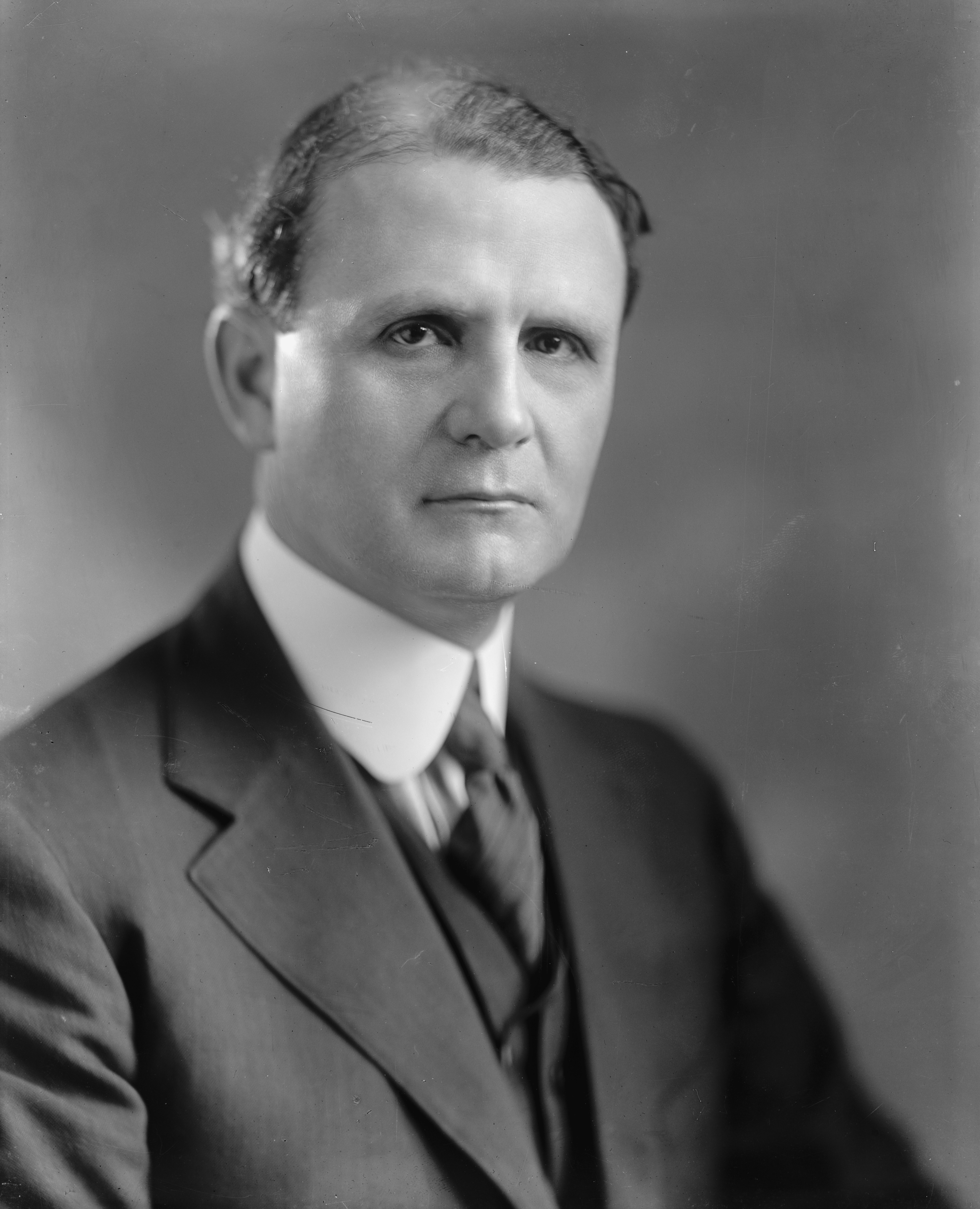

Nominee	Roscoe C. Patterson	Charles M. Hay
Party	Republican	Democratic
Popular vote	787,499	726,322
Percentage	51.91%	47.88%
- County results Patterson: 50–60% 60–70% 70–80% 80–90% Hay: 50–60% 60–70% 70–80% 80–90% Tie: 40–50%
U.S. senator before election
James A. Reed
Democratic
Elected U.S. Senator
Roscoe C. Patterson
Republican

The 1928 United States Senate election in Missouri was held on November 6, 1928. Incumbent Democratic U.S. Senator James A. Reed did not run for re-election to a fourth term. Republican U.S. Representative Roscoe C. Patterson defeated Democrat Charles Hay to win the open seat.

== Democratic primary ==
=== Candidates ===
- James A. Collet, Chariton County prosecutor
- Charles M. Hay, prohibitionist and candidate for U.S. Senate in 1920
- Robert I. Young

=== Results ===
1928 Democratic U.S. Senate primary
Party	Candidate	Votes	%
Democratic	Charles M. Hay	171,088	49.60%
Democratic	James Collet	141,453	41.01%
Democratic	Robert I. Young	32,404	9.39%
Total votes		344,945	100.00%

== Republican primary ==
=== Candidates ===
- William O. Atkeson, former U.S. Representative from Butler (1921–23)
- Bernard Bogy, perennial candidate
- Henry Bundschu, Jackson County attorney
- Nathan Frank, former U.S. Representative from St. Louis (1889–91)
- Roscoe C. Patterson, United States Attorney for the Western District of Missouri and former U.S. Representative from Springfield (1921–23)
- David M. Proctor, candidate for Senate in 1922 and 1926

=== Results ===
1928 Republican U.S. Senate primary
Party	Candidate	Votes	%
Republican	Roscoe C. Patterson	106,513	31.38%
Republican	Nathan Frank	94,850	27.95%
Republican	David M. Proctor	89,600	26.40%
Republican	Henry Bundschu	21,895	6.39%
Republican	William O. Atkeson	15,979	4.71%
Republican	Bernard Bogy	10,772	3.17%
Total votes		339,409	100.00%

== General election ==
=== Results ===
1928 U.S. Senate election in Missouri
Party	Candidate	Votes	%	±%
Republican	Roscoe C. Patterson	787,499	51.91%	▲4.59
Democratic	Charles M. Hay	726,322	47.88%	▼3.97
Socialist	Charles H. Harrison	2,845	0.19%	▼0.54
Socialist Labor	William Wesley Cox	257	0.02%	▼0.08
Total votes		1,516,923	100.00%	

== See also ==
- 1928 United States Senate elections
- List of United States senators from Missouri
