= William P. Elmer =

American politician (1871–1956)

Member of the U.S. House of Representatives from Missouri's 8th district
- In office January 3, 1943 – January 3, 1945
- Preceded by: Clyde Williams
- Succeeded by: A. S. J. Carnahan

Member of the Missouri House of Representatives
- In office 1903-1904; 1921-1922; 1929-1933

Personal details
- Born: March 2, 1871 Robertsville, Missouri
- Died: May 11, 1956 (aged 85) Salem, Missouri
- Party: Republican
- Spouse: Amie Adelmann (m. 1896)
- Profession: Lawyer

William Price Elmer (March 2, 1871 – May 11, 1956) was a U.S. representative from Missouri.

Born in Robertsville, Missouri to William J. and Sarah (Wagoner) Elmer, the family moved to Salem, Missouri in 1875. Elmer attended the public schools and Wingo Law School in Salem, Missouri. He was admitted to the bar in 1892 and commenced practice in Salem, Missouri which is the county seat of Dent County. He served as prosecuting attorney for Dent County, Missouri, in 1895 and 1896 and again in 1905 and 1906. He served as member of the State house of representatives in 1903, 1904, 1921, 1922, and 1929–1933, including the position of temporary speaker and floor leader in 1929. Elmer served as city attorney of Salem, Missouri from 1920 to 1930. He served as delegate or alternate to the Republican National Conventions in 1904, 1908, 1912, and 1920. He served as chairman of the Republican county committee 1908–1944. He served as member of the 1929 commission to revise Missouri laws. He was an unsuccessful candidate for Lieutenant Governor in 1940.

Elmer was elected as a Republican to the Seventy-eighth Congress (January 3, 1943 – January 3, 1945). He was an unsuccessful candidate for reelection in 1944 to the Seventy-ninth Congress. He was an unsuccessful candidate for the Republican nomination for United States Senator in 1946. He resumed the practice of law. He served as director of First National Bank of Salem. He served as member of board of curators of University of Missouri 1949–1955. He wrote a popular series in the Salem News on "History of Dent County."

In 1943, during a debate over the Chinese Exclusion Repeal Act, Elmer, stated that the repeal of the Chinese Exclusion Act would mean "a blitzkrieg of sympathetic eloquence over the plight of the Jews." He said that “nearly every nation of Europe has chased out the Jews” and concluded that "there must have been compelling reasons for their actions."

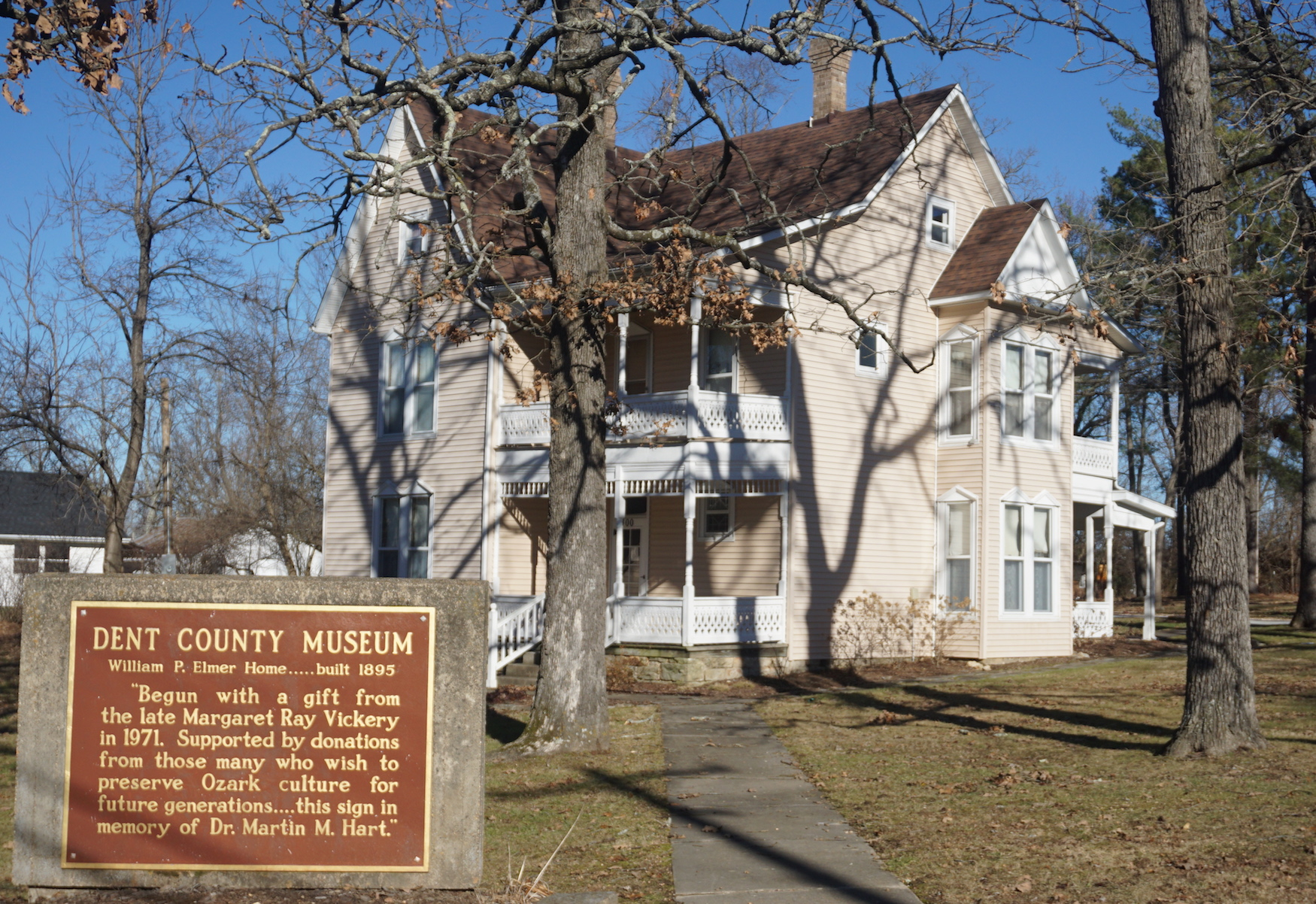
W. P. Elmer Home and current Dent County Museum

Elmer married Amie Adelmann (1872–1963) on December 9, 1896. She was the daughter of Franz and Frances (Duckworth) Adelmann. W. P. and Amie Elmer had nine children: William Doss Elmer, Victorene Dale Elmer, McVeigh Adelmann Elmer, Billie Ruth Elmer, Vivian Katrina Elmer, Helen Willene Elmer, Amelia Imogene Elmer, Lucille Elmer, and Dorothy Elizabeth Elmer. He died in Salem, Missouri, May 11, 1956. He was interred in Cedar Grove Cemetery in Salem, Missouri. His home from 1906 until his death was converted into the Dent County Museum.

Party political offices
Preceded by Manvel H. Davis	Republican nominee for Lieutenant Governor of Missouri; 1940	Succeeded by James G. Blaine
U.S. House of Representatives
Preceded by Clyde Williams	Member of the U.S. House of Representatives from Missouri's 8th congressional district 1943–1945	Succeeded by A. S. J. Carnahan
