= 1940 Missouri lieutenant gubernatorial election =

- November 5, 1940
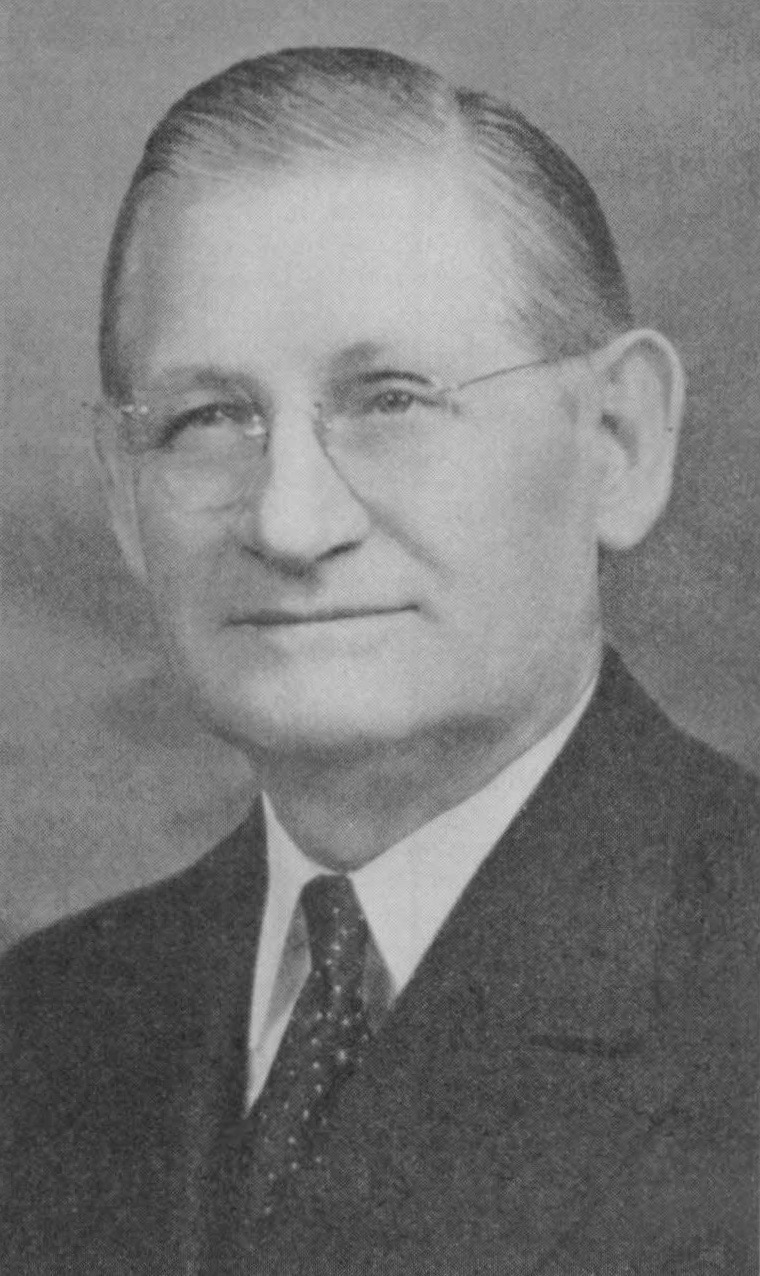

Nominee	Frank Gaines Harris	William P. Elmer
Party	Democratic	Republican
Popular vote	943,868	869,953
Percentage	51.95%	47.88%
Lieutenant Governor before election
Frank Gaines Harris
Democratic
Elected Lieutenant Governor
Frank Gaines Harris
Democratic

The 1940 Missouri lieutenant gubernatorial election was held on November 5, 1940. Democratic incumbent Frank Gaines Harris defeated Republican nominee William P. Elmer with 51.95% of the vote.

== Primary elections ==
Primary elections were held on August 6, 1940.

=== Democratic primary ===
==== Candidates ====
- Frank Gaines Harris, incumbent Lieutenant Governor
- John G. Christy
- Dan D. Porter

==== Results ====
Democratic primary results
Party	Candidate	Votes	%
Democratic	Frank Gaines Harris (incumbent)	284,845	46.10
Democratic	John G. Christy	259,403	41.98
Democratic	Dan D. Porter	73,692	11.93
Total votes		617,940	100.00

=== Republican primary ===
==== Candidates ====
- William P. Elmer, former State Representative
- James E. Ford
- Julius J. Scheske
- George Bartholomaeus

==== Results ====
Republican primary results
Party	Candidate	Votes	%
Republican	William P. Elmer	109,181	38.46
Republican	James E. Ford	92,670	32.64
Republican	Julius J. Scheske	42,434	14.95
Republican	George Bartholomaeus	39,599	13.95
Total votes		73,915	100.00

== General election ==
=== Candidates ===
Major party candidates

- Frank Gaines Harris, Democratic
- William P. Elmer, Republican

Other candidates

- Ada M. Demaree, Socialist
- William J. Cady, Prohibition
- Michael L. Hiltner, Socialist Labor

=== Results ===
1940 Missouri lieutenant gubernatorial election
Party	Candidate	Votes	%	±%
Democratic	Frank Gaines Harris (incumbent)	943,868	51.95%	
Republican	William P. Elmer	869,953	47.88%	
Socialist	Ada M. Demaree	1,602	0.09%	
Prohibition	William J. Cady	1,157	0.06%	
Socialist Labor	Michael L. Hiltner	220	0.01%	
Majority		27,949		
Turnout				
Democratic hold		Swing		
