= Walter Naylor Davis =

American politician (1876–1951)

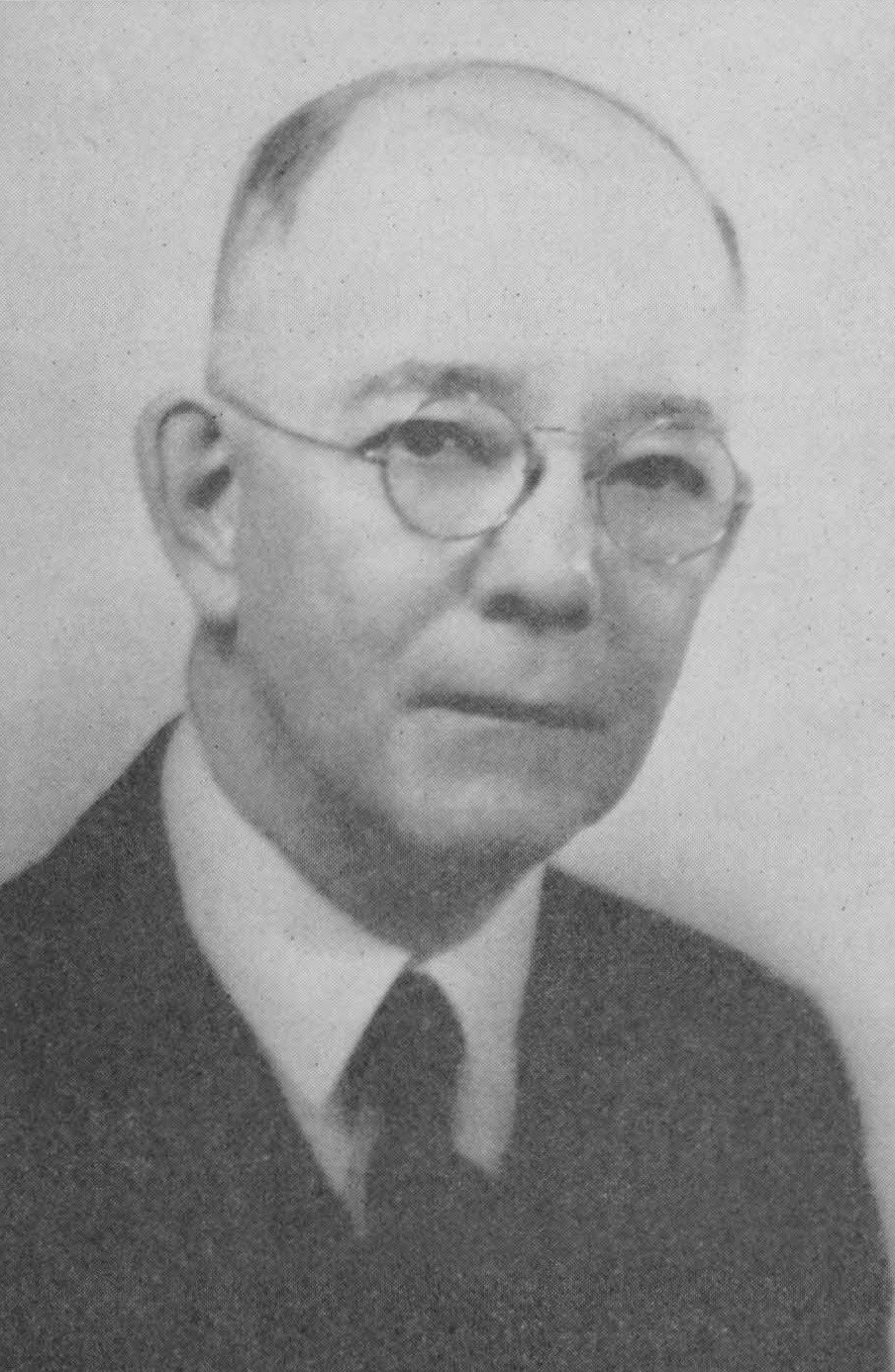

34th Lieutenant Governor of Missouri
- In office January 8, 1945 – January 10, 1949
- Governor: Phil M. Donnelly
- Preceded by: Frank G. Harris
- Succeeded by: James T. Blair Jr.

Personal details
- Born: November 29, 1876 St. Louis County, Missouri, U.S.
- Died: September 16, 1951 (aged 74)
- Party: Democratic
- Profession: Attorney

Walter Naylor Davis (November 29, 1876 – September 16, 1951) was an American Democratic politician from the state of Missouri. He was the state's 34th Lieutenant Governor and a former commissioner of the Missouri Supreme Court.

== Personal history ==
Davis was born in St. Louis, Missouri, the son of Judge Alexander Davis and Alice (Edwards) Davis. He had two brothers and three sisters. Davis' father had been a Colonel in the 5th Division of the Missouri State Guards during the Civil War. and later a judge in the Montana Territory before returning to St. Louis and practicing law. Davis received his secondary education at Smith Academy (St. Louis), graduating in 1894. He received his college degree from Vanderbilt University in 1898, and law degree from Saint Louis University in 1900. In 1901 he married Roberta Randolph Morrison. Davis practiced law as a partner in the firm of Bates, Blodgett, Williams & Davis. He died September 16, 1951, and is buried in Bellefontaine Cemetery in St. Louis.

== Political history ==
Davis made his first foray into elective politics in 1916 by running for a circuit judge position in St. Louis County. However he was soundly defeated by his Republican opponent. He served twice as a commissioner of the Missouri Supreme Court, first in 1923, then again from 1927 to 1931 In 1944 Davis won a narrow victory to become Missouri's 34th Lieutenant Governor.

Missouri Lieutenant Governor Election 1944
| Party | Candidate | Votes | % | ±% |
|---|---|---|---|---|
| Republican | James G. Blaine | 761,568 | 49.05% | |
| Democratic | Walter Naylor Davis | 789,517 | 50.85% | Winner |

Party political offices
| Preceded by Frank Gaines Harris | Democratic nominee for Lieutenant Governor of Missouri; 1944 | Succeeded by James T. Blair Jr. |
Political offices
| Preceded by Frank G. Harris | Lieutenant Governor of Missouri; 1945–1949 | Succeeded by James T. Blair Jr. |
