= 1940 United States Senate election in Missouri =

- November 5, 1940
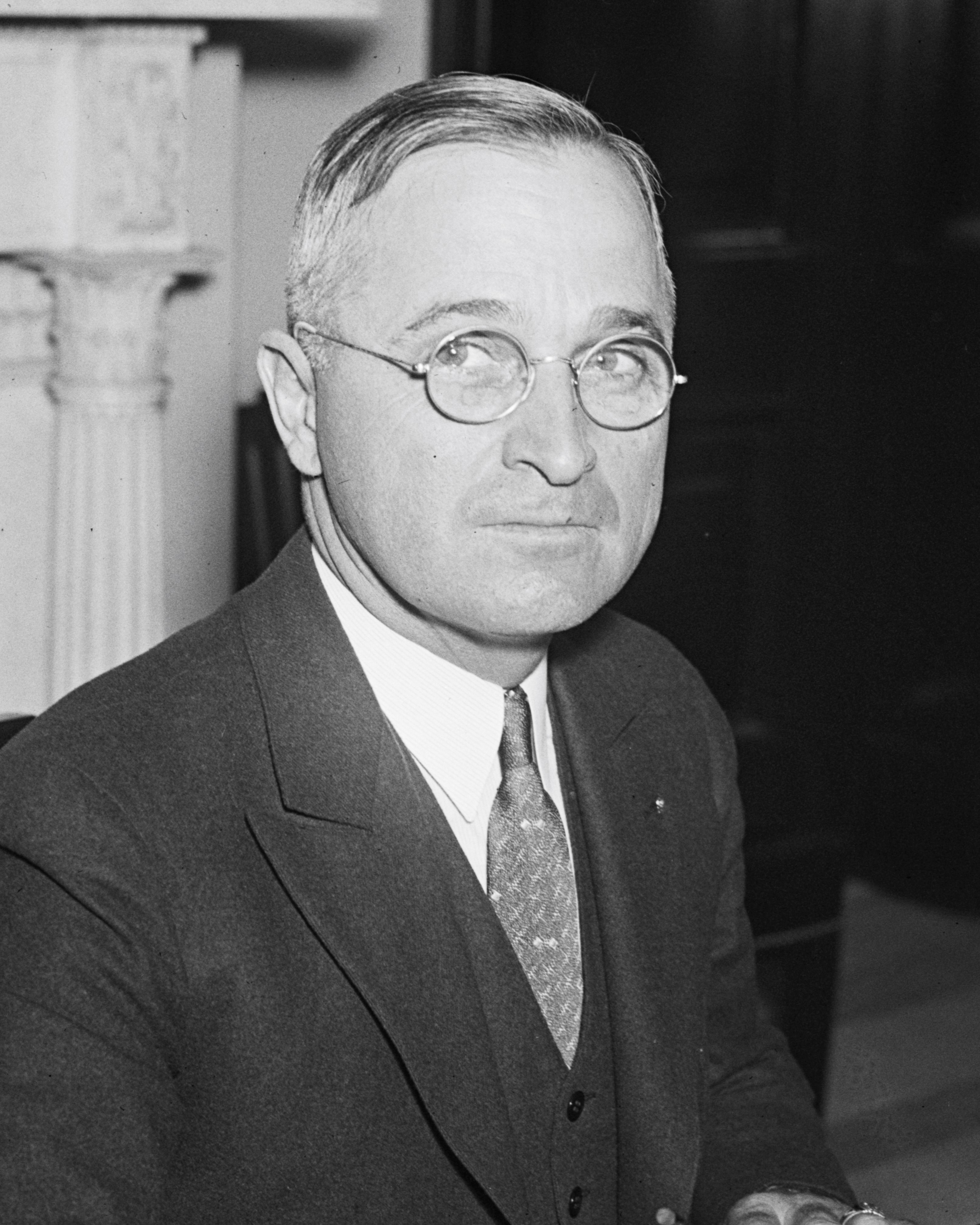

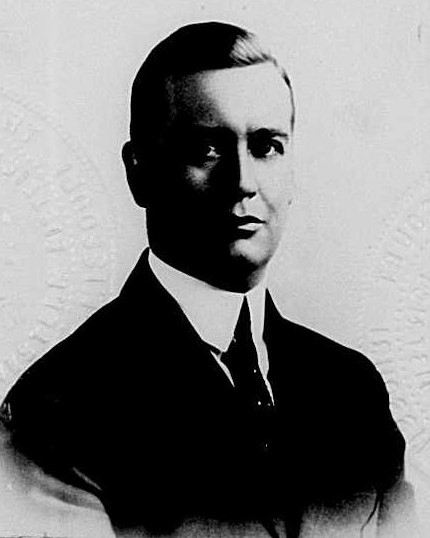
Nominee	Harry S. Truman	Manvel H. Davis
Party	Democratic	Republican
Popular vote	930,775	886,376
Percentage	51.17%	48.73%
- County results Truman: 50–60% 60–70% 70–80% 80–90% Davis: 50–60% 60–70% 70–80% 80–90%
U.S. senator before election
Harry S. Truman
Democratic
Elected U.S. Senator
Harry S. Truman
Democratic

The 1940 United States Senate election in Missouri was held on November 5, 1940. Incumbent Democratic U.S. Senator and future President of the United States Harry S. Truman, who was first elected in 1934, decided to seek re-election to a second term. He narrowly survived a primary challenge from Governor of Missouri Lloyd C. Stark before also narrowly defeating Republican nominee Manvel H. Davis in the general election.

== Democratic primary ==
=== Candidates ===
- Maurice M. Milligan, U.S. Attorney for the Western District of Missouri
- Lloyd C. Stark, Governor of Missouri since 1937
- Harry S. Truman, incumbent U.S. Senator since 1935

=== Campaign ===
Heading into the election of 1940, the Pendergast machine that had propelled Harry S. Truman to victory in the 1934 election had been brought to its knees. Tom Pendergast was ill and imprisoned for widespread voter fraud in the 1936 elections, in which more votes were tallied in Kansas City than its entire population. As such, Truman's connections to Pendergast going back to his 1922 candidacy for judge in Jackson County were a liability in the campaign. Missouri Governor Lloyd C. Stark, who had portrayed himself as an opponent of the machine, challenged Truman for the Democratic nomination for U.S. Senator.

Truman, who had decided to seek a second term in February 1940, overcame his Pendergast connections as well as a substantial financial deficit, defeating Stark for the Democratic nomination.

=== Results ===
1940 Democratic U.S. Senate primary
Party	Candidate	Votes	%
Democratic	Harry S. Truman (incumbent)	268,354	40.91
Democratic	Lloyd C. Stark	260,221	39.67
Democratic	Maurice M. Milligan	127,378	19.42
Total votes		655,953	100

== Republican primary ==
=== Candidates ===
- William Byers
- Manvel H. Davis, former state senator from Kansas City
- Herman G. Grosby
- Harold Milligan
- Ewing Young Mitchell
- Paul O. Peters
- David M. Proctor, perennial candidate

=== Results ===
1940 Republican U.S. Senate primary
Party	Candidate	Votes	%
Republican	Manvel H. Davis	117,501	40.83
Republican	David M. Proctor	82,126	28.54
Republican	Harold H. Milligan	41,630	14.47
Republican	William Byers	13,946	4.85
Republican	Ewing Young Mitchell	12,820	4.46
Republican	Paul O. Peters	12,298	4.27
Republican	Herman G. Grosby	7,463	2.59
Total votes		287,784	100

== General election ==
=== Campaign ===
Touting his experience as a World War I veteran and track record as a U.S. Senator, Truman ultimately defeated Republican candidate and former state senator Manvel H. Davis in the November general election.

=== Results ===
Missouri United States Senate election, 1940
Party	Candidate	Votes	%
Democratic	Harry S. Truman (incumbent)	930,775	51.17
Republican	Manvel H. Davis	886,376	48.73
Socialist	W.F. Rinck	1,669	0.09
Socialist Labor	Theodore Baeff	196	0.01
Total votes		1,819,016	100

==== By county ====
County	Harry S. Truman Democratic		Manvel H. Davis Republican		W. F. Rinck Socialist		Theodore Baeff Socialist Labor		Margin		Total
County	Votes	%	Votes	%	Votes	%	Votes	%	Votes	%	Total
Adair	4,663	44.91%	5,696	54.85%	25	0.24%	0	0.00%	-1,033	-9.95%	10,384
Andrew	3,003	40.59%	4,393	59.38%	2	0.03%	0	0.00%	-1,390	-18.79%	7,398
Atchison	2,882	45.99%	3,381	53.95%	4	0.06%	0	0.00%	-499	-7.96%	6,267
Audrain	7,624	68.65%	3,477	31.31%	4	0.04%	0	0.00%	4,147	37.34%	11,105
Barry	5,213	44.49%	6,498	55.45%	7	0.06%	0	0.00%	-1,285	-10.97%	11,718
Barton	3,415	47.40%	3,775	52.40%	13	0.18%	1	0.01%	-360	-5.00%	7,204
Bates	4,856	45.85%	5,725	54.06%	10	0.09%	0	0.00%	-869	-8.21%	10,591
Benton	1,719	30.36%	3,938	69.55%	6	0.11%	2	0.04%	-2,219	-39.19%	5,662
Bollinger	2,518	42.66%	3,381	57.28%	4	0.07%	0	0.00%	-863	-14.62%	5,903
Boone	11,336	69.09%	5,051	30.79%	15	0.09%	5	0.03%	6,285	38.31%	16,407
Buchanan	24,069	57.66%	17,666	42.32%	8	0.02%	1	0.00%	6,403	15.34%	41,744
Butler	6,168	43.92%	7,862	59.98%	13	0.09%	1	0.01%	-1,694	-12.06%	14,044
Caldwell	2,731	40.82%	3,955	59.11%	5	0.07%	0	0.00%	-1,224	-18.29%	6,691
Callaway	7,149	66.88%	3,530	33.02%	8	0.07%	2	0.02%	3,619	33.86%	10,689
Camden	1,519	36.24%	2,672	63.74%	1	0.02%	0	0.00%	-1,153	-27.50%	4,192
Cape Girardeau	8,517	47.79%	9,286	52.11%	15	0.08%	2	0.01%	-769	4.32%	17,820
Carroll	4,483	42.94%	5,956	57.05%	1	0.01%	0	0.00%	-1,473	-14.11%	10,440
Carter	1,491	55.70%	1,180	44.08%	4	0.15%	2	0.07%	311	11.62%	2,677
Cass	5,413	51.88%	5,007	47.99%	14	0.13%	0	0.00%	406	3.89%	10,434
Cedar	1,933	31.92%	4,111	67.89%	10	0.17%	1	0.02%	-2,178	-35.97%	6,055
Chariton	5,060	53.45%	4,404	46.52%	2	0.02%	0	0.00%	656	6.93%	9,466
Christian	1,701	27.49%	4,483	72.45%	3	0.05%	1	0.02%	-2,782	-44.96%	6,188
Clark	2,734	46.62%	3,128	53.33%	3	0.05%	0	0.00%	-394	-6.72%	5,865
Clay	9,416	59.86%	6,302	40.06%	12	0.08%	0	0.00%	3,114	19.80%	15,730
Clinton	3,719	54.45%	3,107	45.49%	4	0.06%	0	0.00%	612	8.96%	6,830
Cole	8,360	52.77%	7,482	47.23%	1	0.01%	0	0.00%	878	5.54%	15,843
Cooper	4,579	44.53%	5,700	55.43%	2	0.02%	2	0.02%	-1,121	-10.91%	10,283
Crawford	2,674	42.36%	3,633	57.55%	5	0.08%	1	0.02%	-959	-15.19%	6,313
Dade	1,777	31.09%	3,934	68.82%	5	0.09%	0	0.00%	-2,157	-37.74%	5,716
Dallas	1,551	28.77%	3,833	71.10%	7	0.13%	0	0.00%	-2,282	-42.33%	5,391
Daviess	3,256	42.88%	4,335	57.08%	3	0.04%	0	0.00%	-1,079	-14.21%	7,594
DeKalb	2,436	43.91%	3,108	56.02%	3	0.05%	1	0.02%	-672	-12.11%	5,548
Dent	3,088	53.71%	2.651	46.11%	10	0.17%	0	0.00%	437	7.60%	5,749
Douglas	1,320	21.31%	4,853	78.36%	19	0.31%	1	0.02%	-3,533	-57.05%	6,193
Dunklin	11,034	67.39%	5,331	32.56%	8	0.05%	0	0.00%	5,703	34.83%	16,373
Franklin	7,011	40.28%	10,376	59.61%	19	0.11%	1	0.01%	-3,365	-19.33%	17,407
Gasconade	1,138	17.61%	5,323	82.36%	2	0.03%	0	0.00%	-4,185	-64.75%	6,463
Gentry	3,644	51.14%	3,471	48.72%	9	0.13%	1	0.01%	173	2.43%	7,125
Greene	21,623	49.83%	21,726	50.07%	38	0.09%	3	0.01%	-103	-0.24%	43,390
Grundy	3,649	44.51%	4,544	55.43%	5	0.06%	0	0.00%	-895	-10.92%	8,198
Harrison	3,249	37.84%	5,338	62.16%	0	0.00%	0	0.00%	-2,089	-24.33%	8,587
Henry	5,929	47.98%	6,419	51.95%	9	0.07%	0	0.00%	-490	-3.97%	12,357
Hickory	772	23.57%	2,501	76.34%	3	0.09%	0	0.01%	1,729	52.78%	3,276
Holt	2,565	40.55%	3,759	59.42%	2	0.03%	0	0.00%	-1,194	-18.87%	6,326
Howard	4,748	67.21%	2,309	32.69%	6	0.08%	1	0.01%	2,539	35.94%	7,064
Howell	4,119	40.26%	6,102	59.64%	11	0.11%	0	0.00%	-1,983	-19.38%	10,232
Iron	2,481	54.96%	2,030	44.97%	2	0.04%	1	0.02%	451	9.99%	4,514
Jackson	22,140	54.87%	18,185	45.07%	22	0.05%	2	0.00%	3,955	9.80%	40,349
Jasper	17,759	48.43%	18,870	51.46%	40	0.11%	0	0.00%	-1,111	-3.03%	36,669
Jefferson	9,163	54.24%	7,716	45.67%	15	0.09%	0	0.00%	1,447	8.57%	16,894
Johnson	5,308	44.70%	6,558	55.22%	10	0.08%	0	0.00%	-1,250	-10.53%	11,876
Kansas City	110,964	56.28%	86,074	43.65%	115	0.06%	26	0.01%	24,890	12.62%	197,179
Knox	2,532	51.42%	2,392	48.58%	0	0.00%	0	0.00%	140	2.84%	4,924
Laclede	3,248	39.53%	4,965	60.42%	4	0.05%	0	0.00%	-1,717	20.90%	8,217
Lafeyette	6,784	43.42%	8,826	56.49%	11	0.07%	3	0.02%	-2,042	13.07%	15,624
Lawrence	5,286	41.95%	7,309	58.00%	5	0.04%	1	0.01%	-2,023	-16.05%	12,601
Lewis	3,467	56.86%	2,623	43.02%	7	0.11%	0	0.00%	844	13.84%	6,097
Lincoln	4,409	59.46%	3,001	40.47%	3	0.04%	2	0.03%	1,408	18.99%	7,415
Linn	6,065	51.21%	5,773	48.74%	6	0.05%	0	0.00%	292	2.47%	11,844
Livingston	4,568	46.31%	5,291	53.63%	6	0.06%	0	0.00%	-723	-7.33%	9,865
Macon	6,056	53.09%	5,345	46.85%	6	0.05%	1	0.01%	711	6.23%	11,408
Madison	2,399	47.96%	2,602	52.02%	1	0.02%	0	0.00%	-203	-4.06%	5,002
Maries	2,120	55.66%	1,689	44.34%	0	0.00%	0	0.00%	431	11.32%	3,809
Marion	9,473	60.95%	6,061	39.00%	6	0.04%	1	0.01%	3,412	21.95%	15,541
McDonald	3,313	45.16%	4,016	54.74%	7	0.10%	0	0.00%	-703	-9.58%	7,336
Mercer	1,282	31.12%	2,834	68.79%	2	0.05%	2	0.05%	-1,502	36.46%	4,120
Miller	3,054	43.39%	3,978	56.51%	7	0.10%	0	0.00%	-924	-13.13%	7,039
Mississippi	4,319	59.36%	2,951	40.56%	4	0.05%	2	0.03%	1,368	18.80%	7,276
Moniteau	2,917	44.59%	3,622	55.37%	2	0.03%	1	0.02%	705	10.78%	6,542
Monroe	5,959	82.96%	1,220	16.98%	3	0.04%	1	0.01%	4,739	65.98%	7,183
Montgomery	3,165	44.59%	3,927	55.33%	5	0.07%	1	0.01%	-762	-10.74%	7,098
Morgan	2,335	42.36%	3,173	57.57%	3	0.05%	1	0.02%	-838	-15.20%	5,512
New Madrid	9,438	60.14%	6,251	39.83%	4	0.03%	1	0.01%	3,187	20.31%	15,694
Newton	6,240	43.83%	7,982	56.06%	14	0.10%	2	0.01%	-1,742	-12.23%	14,238
Nodaway	6,556	49.09%	6,791	50.85%	6	0.04%	1	0.01%	-235	-1.76%	13,354
Oregon	3,602	67.04%	1,770	32.94%	1	0.02%	0	0.02%	1,832	34.10%	5,373
Osage	2,495	41.22%	3,554	58.71%	4	0.07%	0	0.00%	-1,059	-17.50%	6,053
Ozark	981	23.08%	3,265	76.81%	4	0.09%	1	0.02%	-2,284	-53.73%	4,251
Pemiscot	9,459	62.20%	5,739	37.74%	9	0.06%	0	0.00%	3,720	24.46%	15,207
Perry	2,398	34.32%	4,584	65.61%	5	0.07%	0	0.00%	-2,186	-31.29%	6,987
Pettis	8,401	48.17%	9,035	51.81%	4	0.02%	0	0.00%	-634	-3.64%	17,440
Phelps	4,692	58.31%	3,345	41.57%	8	0.10%	2	0.02%	1,347	16.74%	8,047
Pike	5,523	58.97%	3,829	40.89%	12	0.13%	1	0.01%	1,694	18.09%	9,365
Platte	4,591	64.58%	2,513	35.35%	5	0.07%	0	0.00%	2,078	29.23%	7,109
Polk	3,350	37.71%	5,526	62.21%	7	0.08%	0	0.00%	-2,176	-24.50%	8,883
Pulaski	2,772	54.79%	2,280	45.07%	5	0.10%	2	0.04%	492	9.73%	5,059
Putnam	1,662	30.06%	3,856	69.74%	11	0.20%	0	0.00%	-2,194	-39.68%	5,529
Ralls	3,524	71.21%	1,424	28.77%	1	0.02%	0	0.00%	2,100	42.43%	4,949
Randolph	9,112	73.53%	3,278	26.45%	3	0.02%	0	0.00%	5,834	47.07%	12,393
Ray	5,777	62.81%	3,416	37.14%	4	0.04%	1	0.01%	2,361	25.67%	9,198
Reynolds	2,402	67.17%	1,174	32.83%	0	0.00%	0	0.00%	1,228	34.34%	3,576
Ripley	2,393	51.39%	2,245	48.21%	17	0.37%	2	0.04%	148	3.18%	4,657
Saline	7,947	52.10%	7,299	47.86%	6	0.04%	0	0.00%	648	4.25%	15,252
Schuyler	2,012	54.26%	1,690	45.58%	5	0.13%	1	0.03%	322	8.68%	3,708
Scotland	2,418	50.94%	2,316	48.79%	12	0.25%	1	0.02%	102	2.15%	4,747
Scott	7,862	65.03%	4,213	37.33%	14	0.12%	1	0.01%	3,649	30.18%	12,090
Shannon	2,850	63.96%	1,588	35.64%	18	0.40%	0	0.00%	1,262	28.32%	4,456
Shelby	3,983	64.61%	2,180	35.36%	2	0.03%	0	0.00%	1,803	29.25%	6,165
St. Charles	5,192	39.75%	7,841	60.02%	28	0.21%	2	0.02%	-2,649	-20.28%	13,063
St. Clair	2,807	41.38%	3,970	58.52%	7	0.10%	0	0.00%	-1,163	-17.14%	6,784
St. Francois	7,977	47.62%	8,769	52.35%	5	0.03%	0	0.00%	-792	-4.73%	16,751
St. Louis City	222,847	55.71%	176,575	44.14%	536	0.14%	81	0.02%	46,512	-7.39%	400,039
St. Louis County	46,619	39.48%	71,251	60.34%	191	0.16%	15	0.01%	-24,632	-20.86%	118,076
St. Genevieve	2,151	44.91%	2,633	54.97%	6	0.13%	0	0.00%	-482	-10.06%	4,790
Stoddard	6,678	52.60%	6,005	47.29%	13	0.10%	1	0.01%	673	5.30%	12,697
Stone	1,025	22.31%	3,567	77.64%	2	0.04%	0	0.00%	-2,542	-55.33%	4,594
Sullivan	3,758	48.14%	4,048	51.85%	1	0.01%	0	0.00%	-290	-3.71%	7,807
Taney	1,486	32.24%	3,115	67.59%	7	0.15%	1	0.02%	-1,629	-35.34%	4,609
Texas	4,504	49.00%	4,682	50.94%	5	0.05%	0	0.00%	-178	-1.94%	9,191
Vernon	6,238	53.42%	5,430	46.50%	9	0.08%	1	0.01%	808	6.92%	11,678
Warren	911	21.08%	3,398	78.64%	11	0.25%	1	0.02%	-2,487	-57.56%	4,321
Washington	2,894	43.21%	3,797	56.70%	3	0.04%	3	0.04%	-903	-13.48%	6,697
Wayne	2,987	52.31%	2,722	47.67%	0	0.00%	1	0.02%	265	4.64%	5,710
Webster	3,491	41.92%	4,829	57.99%	8	0.10%	0	0.00%	668	2.46%	8,328
Worth	1,643	47.31%	1,828	52.63%	2	0.06%	0	0.00%	-185	-5.33%	3,473
Wright	2,710	34.91%	5,050	65.06%	2	0.03%	0	0.00%	-2,340	-30.15%	7,762

== See also ==
- 1940 United States Senate elections
- List of United States senators from Missouri
