= 1936 Missouri lieutenant gubernatorial election =

- November 3, 1936
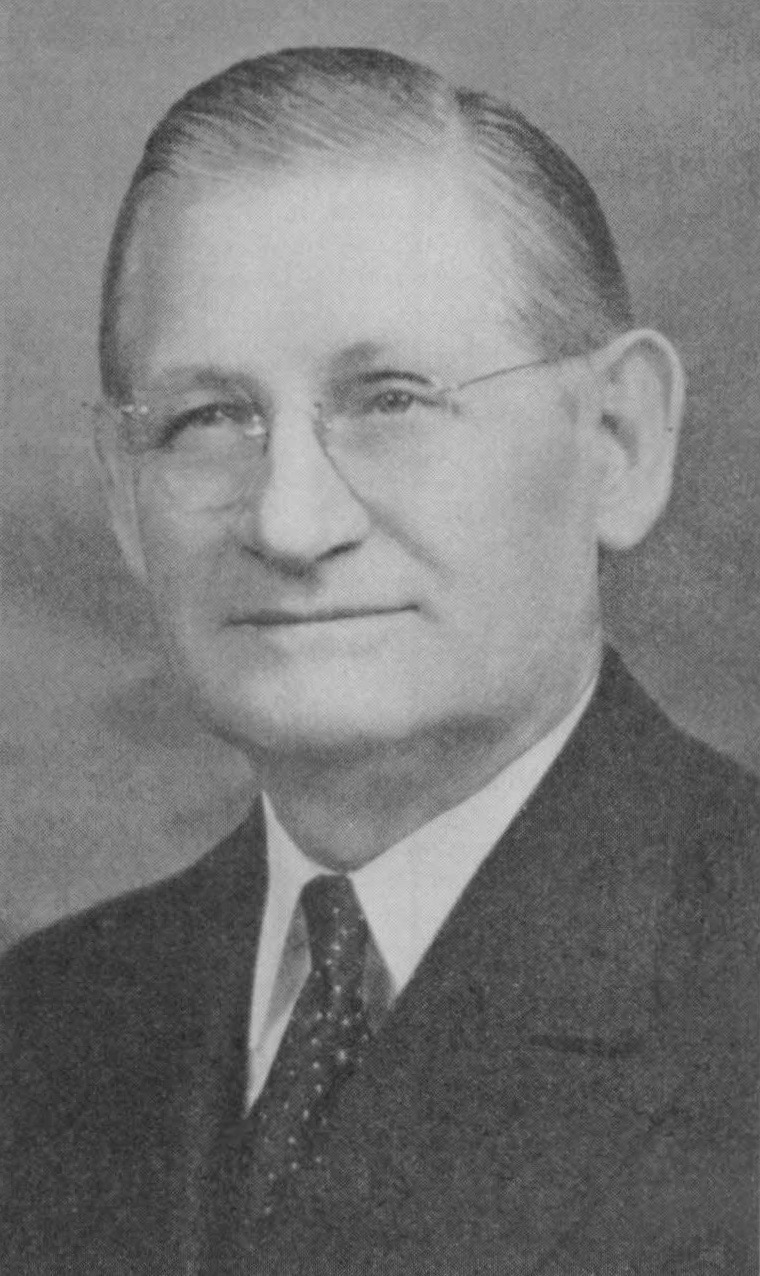

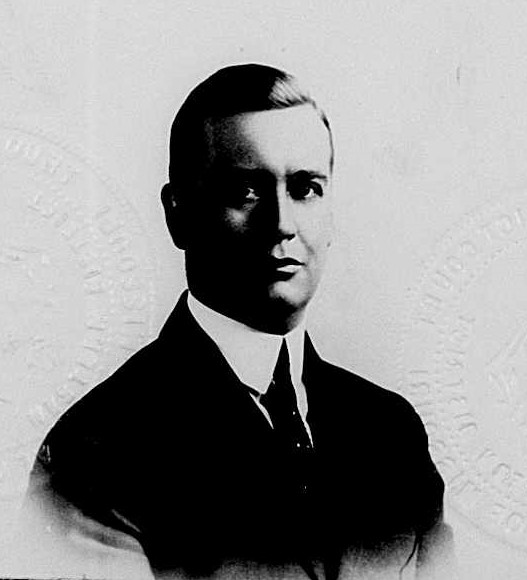
Nominee	Frank Gaines Harris	Manvel H. Davis
Party	Democratic	Republican
Popular vote	1,081,386	723,467
Percentage	59.80%	40.01%
Lieutenant Governor before election
Frank Gaines Harris
Democratic
Elected Lieutenant Governor
Frank Gaines Harris
Democratic

The 1936 Missouri lieutenant gubernatorial election was held on November 3, 1936. Democratic incumbent Frank Gaines Harris defeated Republican nominee Manvel H. Davis with 59.80% of the vote.

== Primary elections ==
Primary elections were held on August 4, 1936.

=== Republican primary ===
==== Candidates ====
- Manvel H. Davis, former State Senator
- John R. Davis
- Henri Chouteau

==== Results ====
Republican primary results
Party	Candidate	Votes	%
Republican	Manvel H. Davis	129,065	42.58
Republican	John R. Davis	92,692	30.58
Republican	Henri Chouteau	81,376	26.85
Total votes		303,133	100.00

== General election ==
=== Candidates ===
Major party candidates

- Frank Gaines Harris, Democratic
- Manvel H. Davis, Republican

Other candidates

- George A. Kovaka, Socialist
- Vanderbilt Belton, Communist
- Karl Oberheu, Socialist Labor

=== Results ===
1936 Missouri lieutenant gubernatorial election
Party	Candidate	Votes	%	±%
Democratic	Frank Gaines Harris (incumbent)	1,081,386	59.80%	
Republican	Manvel H. Davis	723,467	40.01%	
Socialist	George A. Kovaka	2,836	0.16%	
Communist	Vanderbilt Belton	344	0.02%	
Socialist Labor	Karl Oberheu	299	0.02%	
Majority		357,919		
Turnout				
Democratic hold		Swing		
