= Edward Henry Winter =

American politician and newspaper publisher

Edward H. Winter
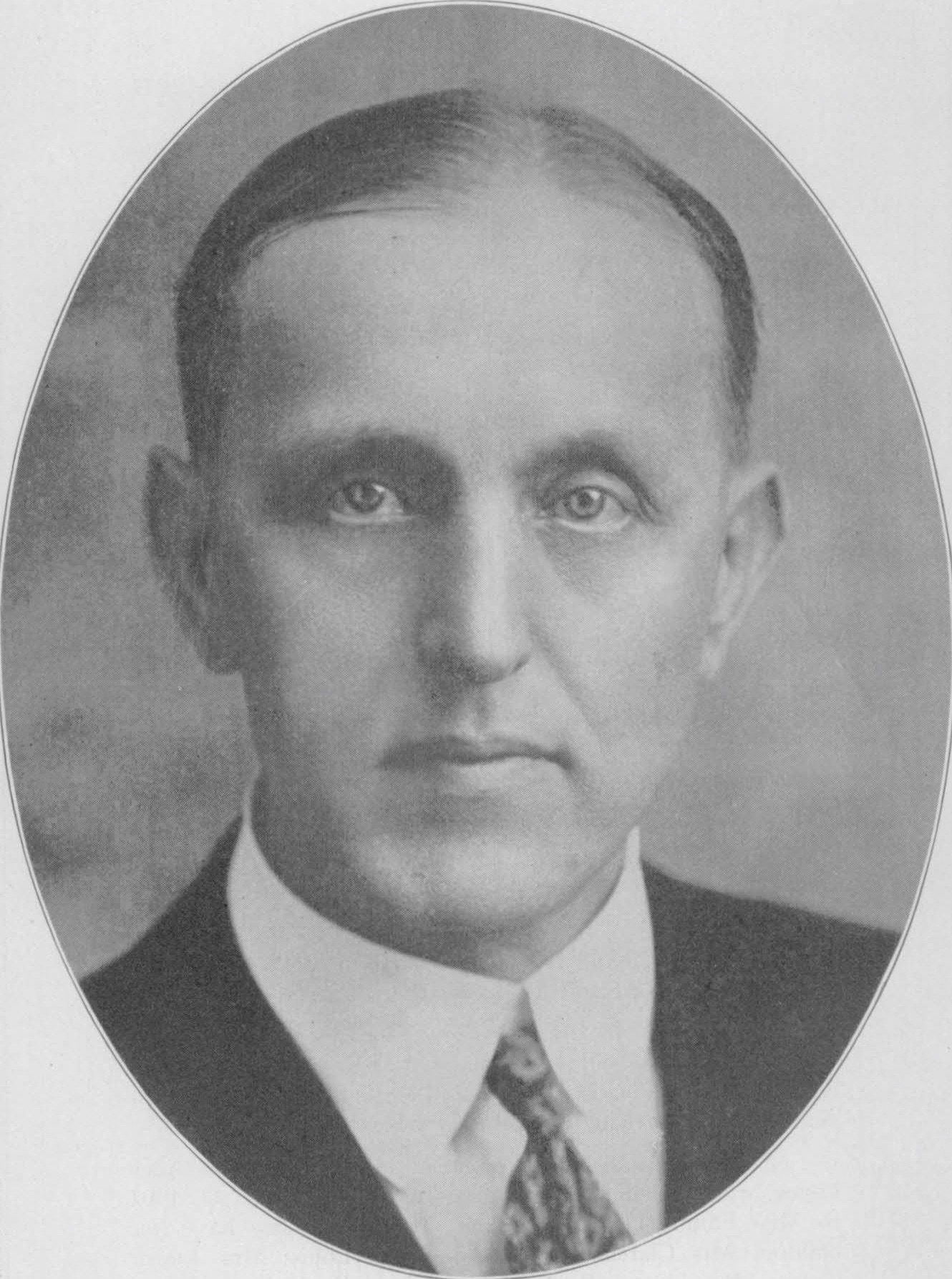

32nd Lieutenant Governor of Missouri
- In office January 14, 1929 – January 9, 1933
- Governor: Henry S. Caulfield
- Preceded by: Philip Allen Bennett
- Succeeded by: Frank Gaines Harris

Personal details
- Born: April 5, 1879 Warren County, Missouri, U.S.
- Died: June 29, 1941 (aged 62)
- Party: Republican
- Spouse: Dena M. Koelling
- Children: 3
- Profession: Newspaper publisher Politician

Edward Henry Winter (April 5, 1879 – June 29, 1941) was an American politician and newspaper publisher from the state of Missouri. He served as the state’s 32nd Lieutenant Governor as well as in the Missouri General Assembly. Winter was a member of the Republican Party.

== Personal history ==
Edward H. Winter was born on his family farm in rural Warren County, Missouri to German immigrant parents Frederick Anton Winter and Dora (Richterberg) Winter. He was the fifth of eleven children born to the couple and had two older half-sisters. Mr. Winter received his education in the rural schools of Warren County. He obtained his higher education at Central Wesleyan College in Warrenton, Missouri, graduating with honors in June 1904. Following college Winter, worked for the United States Customs Service for a year before returning to Warrenton and taking over as business manager and editor of the Banner newspaper. On October 18, 1905 Edward Winter married Dena M. Koelling and they had three children, two sons and a daughter.

== Political history ==
Edward Winter's first foray into politics was as an alternative Missouri delegate to the 1912 Republican National Convention. Despite having no law degree, he served as a probate judge in 1921 before being elected to the Missouri House of Representatives in 1922. Winter served four terms there, including duty as Speaker of the House of Representatives during the 54th Missouri General Assembly (1927–1929). In November 1928 he was elected to his only term as Missouri Lieutenant Governor, serving in that capacity until January, 1933. After leaving office he returned to Warrenton and continued his newspaper career until his death on June 29, 1941.

Party political offices
Preceded by Philip Allen Bennett	Republican nominee for Lieutenant Governor of Missouri; 1928	Succeeded by James J. Barrett
Preceded by Henry S. Caulfield	Republican nominee for Governor of Missouri; 1932	Succeeded by Jesse W. Barrett
Political offices
Preceded by Philip A. Bennett	Lieutenant Governor of Missouri; 1929–1933	Succeeded by Frank G. Harris
