= Frank Gaines Harris =

American politician

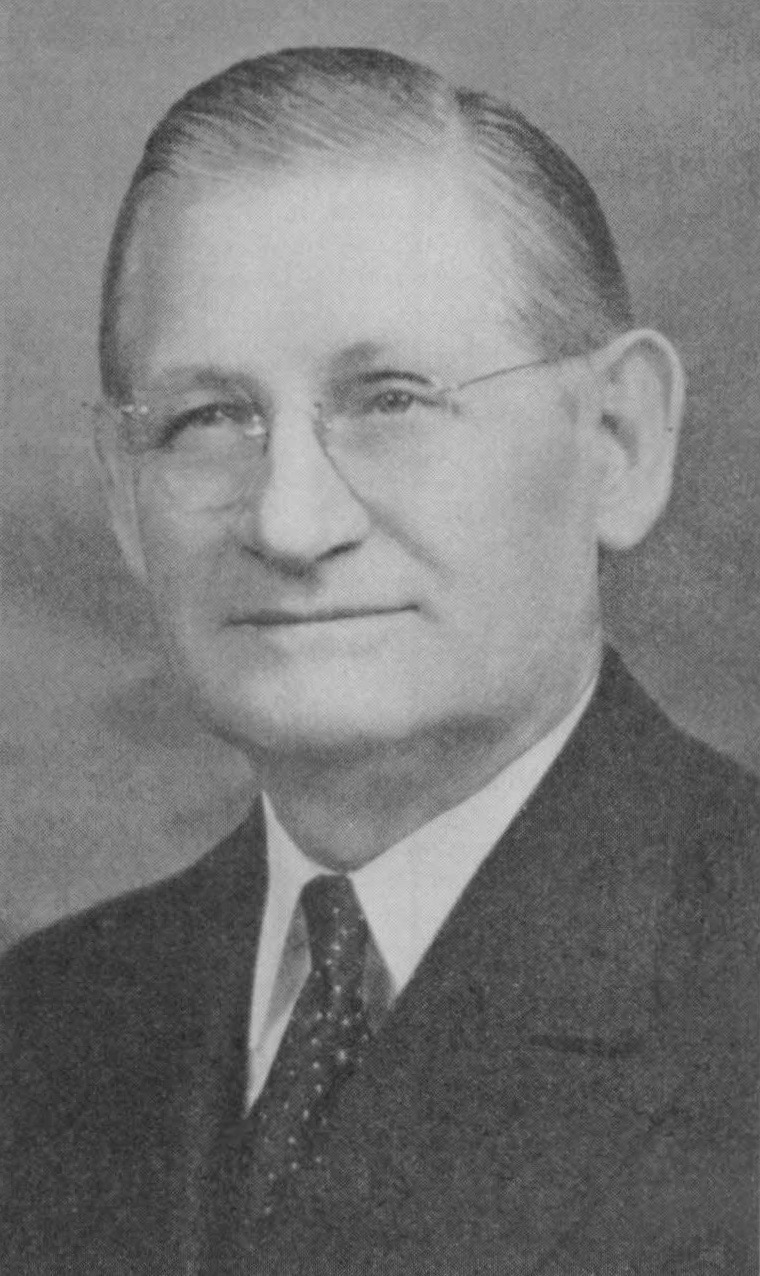

33rd Lieutenant Governor of Missouri
- In office January 9, 1933 – December 30, 1944
- Governor: Guy Brasfield Park; Lloyd C. Stark; Forrest C. Donnell
- Preceded by: Edward Henry Winter
- Succeeded by: Walter Naylor Davis

Member of the Missouri Senate
- In office 1915–1932

Personal details
- Born: April 25, 1871 Boone County, Missouri, U.S.
- Died: December 30, 1944 (aged 73) Jefferson City, Missouri, U.S.
- Resting place: Columbia Cemetery Columbia, Missouri
- Party: Democratic
- Profession: Attorney; Politics

Frank Gaines Harris (April 25, 1871 – December 30, 1944) was an American Democratic politician from the state of Missouri. He was the state's 33rd Lieutenant Governor and held that office longer than anyone else until Peter Kinder surpassed that record, serving three terms from 2005 until 2017.

== Personal history ==
Frank G. Harris was born in Boone County, Missouri to parents Robert and Mary E. (Proctor) Harris. He received his higher education at the Kirksville Normal School (now Truman State University) and graduated from the University of Missouri with an L.L.B. in Law in 1898. Harris established a law practice in Columbia, Missouri after passing the Bar. He and his wife, Grace (Sims) Harris, were the parents of two daughters and a son.

== Political history ==
Frank G. Harris served as Boone County Prosecuting Attorney for six years before being elected to the Missouri General Assembly. He first served in the House of Representatives then as State Senator from the 10th district between 1915 and 1932. In 1932 he won the first of three consecutive terms as Lieutenant Governor and did not choose to run for a fourth. Harris died of heart failure shortly before the end of his third term.

Party political offices
Preceded by Carter M. Buford	Democratic nominee for Lieutenant Governor of Missouri; 1928, 1932, 1936, 1940	Succeeded by Walter Naylor Davis
Political offices
Preceded by Edward H. Winter	Lieutenant Governor of Missouri; 1933–1944	Succeeded by Walter Naylor Davis
