= Roscoe C. Patterson =

American politician

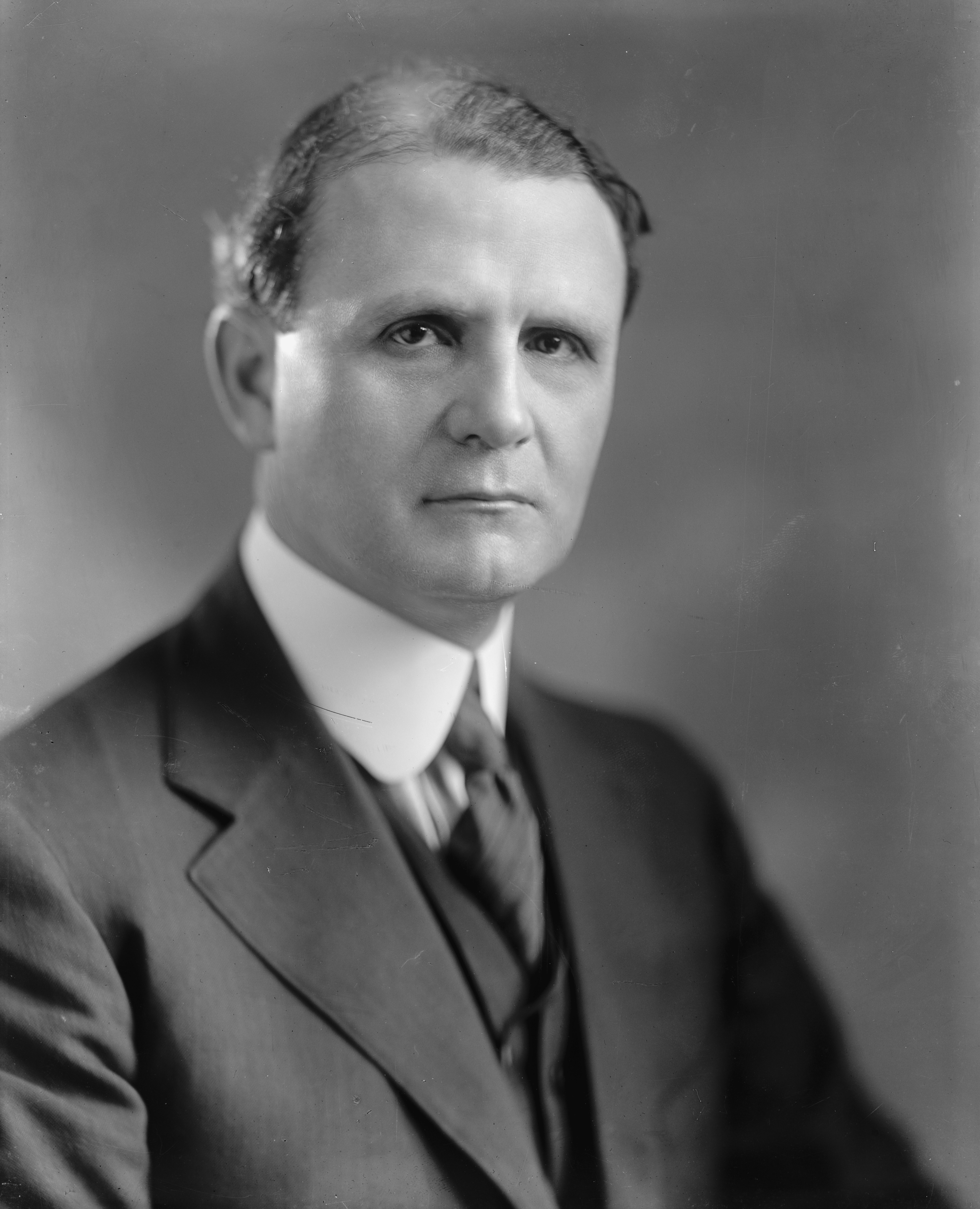

United States Senator from Missouri
- In office March 4, 1929 – January 3, 1935
- Preceded by: James A. Reed
- Succeeded by: Harry S. Truman

United States Attorney for the Western District of Missouri
- In office December 21, 1925 – February 28, 1929
- Preceded by: Charles C. Madison
- Succeeded by: William L. Vandeventer

Member of the U.S. House of Representatives from Missouri's 7th district
- In office March 4, 1921 – March 3, 1923
- Preceded by: Samuel C. Major
- Succeeded by: Samuel C. Major

Personal details
- Born: Roscoe Conkling Patterson; September 15, 1876 Springfield, Missouri, U.S.
- Died: October 22, 1954 (aged 78) Springfield, Missouri, U.S.
- Resting place: Maple Park Cemetery, Springfield, Missouri
- Party: Republican
- Spouse: Ada Holman
- Children: 2
- Education: Washington University in St. Louis
- Profession: Attorney

Roscoe Conkling Patterson (September 15, 1876 – October 22, 1954) was an American lawyer from Missouri. He was most notable for his service as a United States representative (1921–1923) and a U.S. senator (1929–1935).

== Early life ==
Patterson was born in Springfield, Missouri on September 15, 1876. He attended public and private schools, Drury College, (Springfield) and the University of Missouri in Columbia. He graduated from Washington University School of Law in St. Louis in 1897, was admitted to the bar later that year, and commenced practice in Springfield.

== Start of career ==
From 1903 to 1907, Patterson served as prosecuting attorney of Greene County. In 1912, Patterson was appointed to the Missouri Republican State Committee, and he served until 1920.

Patterson was elected to the United States House of Representatives in 1920 and served in the 67th Congress, March 4, 1921 to March 3, 1923. He was an unsuccessful candidate for reelection in 1922 and resumed the practice of law in Springfield. He was a presidential elector in 1924.

From 1925 to 1929, Patterson resided in Kansas City, Missouri and was United States district attorney for the western district of Missouri. He resigned in February 1929 in preparation to assume the seat in the United States Senate to which he was elected in November 1928.

== U.S. Senate ==
Patterson won the general election in November 1928. He took his Senate seat the following year and served one term, March 4, 1929, to January 3, 1935. While in the Senate, he was chairman of the Committee on Mines and Mining (72nd Congress). His chief legislative accomplishment was sponsorship of the Lindbergh Law, which enabled federal authorities to investigate kidnappings if the victims were transported across state lines.

Patterson served during the Great Depression, which was largely blamed on Republican economic policies. He consistently opposed the New Deal remedies of President Franklin D. Roosevelt, which made him unpopular in Missouri. As a result, Patterson was an unsuccessful candidate for reelection in the 1934 election, losing the general election to the Democratic nominee, Harry S. Truman.

== Later career ==
After leaving the Senate, Patterson resumed the practice of law in Springfield. For several years, Patterson was a member of the Missouri Appellate Judicial Commission.

== Death and burial ==
Patterson suffered a stroke in July 1954. His health deteriorated and he died in Springfield on October 22, 1954. He was buried at Maple Park Cemetery in Springfield.

== Family ==
Patterson was married to Ada Holman of Springfield (1877–1957). They were the parents of two children, Paul (1902–1924) and Hadley (1908–1958).

== Sources ==
=== Books ===
- Barrett, Paul W.; Barrett, Mary H. (1988). Young Brothers Massacre. Columbia, MO: University of Missouri Press. ISBN 978-0-8262-0650-3.
- Christensen, Lawrence O.; Foley, William E.; Kremer, Gary, eds. (1999). Dictionary of Missouri Biography. Columbia, MO: University of Missouri Press. ISBN 978-0-8262-6016-1.
- Spencer, Thomas E. (1998). Where They're Buried. Baltimore, MD: Clearfield Company. p. 131. ISBN 978-0-8063-4823-0.
- Toberman, Walter H. (1951). Official Manual of the State of Missouri. Jefferson City, MO: Missouri Secretary of State.
- U.S. Senate Committee on Mines and Mining (1932). Hearing Record: To Create a Bituminous Coal Commission. Washington, DC: US Government Printing Office.

=== Newspapers ===
- "Funeral Service for Paul Patterson Sunday Afternoon". Springfield Republican. Springfield, MO. November 22, 1924 – via Newspapers.com.
- "GOP Leader's Widow Dead". Springfield Leader-Press. Springfield, MO. October 25, 1957 – via Newspapers.com.
- "Hadley Patterson Dies at Hospital After Long Illness". Springfield News-Leader. Springfield, MO. May 2, 1958 – via Newspapers.com.

Party political offices
Preceded by R. R. Brewster	Republican nominee for U.S. Senator from Missouri (Class 1); 1928, 1934	Succeeded by Manvel H. Davis
U.S. House of Representatives
Preceded by Samuel C. Major	United States Representative for the 7th congressional district of Missouri; 1921–1923	Succeeded by Samuel C. Major
U.S. Senate
Preceded by James A. Reed	U.S. senator (Class 1) from Missouri; 1929–1935; Served alongside: Harry B. Hawes, Bennett Champ Clark	Succeeded by Harry S. Truman
