= Manvel H. Davis =

American politician

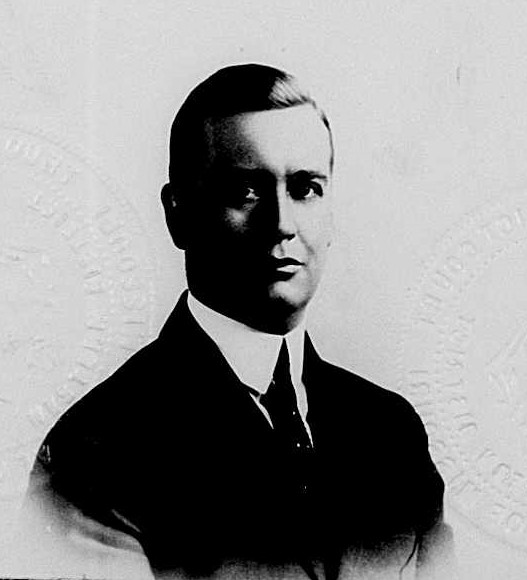
Davis c. 1921

Manvel Humphrey Davis (April 7, 1891 – February 10, 1959) was a member of the Missouri House of Representatives and Missouri State Senate. Davis, a Republican, challenged Harry S. Truman in the 1940 election for re-election after the collapse of the big city machine of Truman's patron Tom Pendergast.

Truman had squeaked through the Democratic primary when his opponents Lloyd Stark and Maurice Milligan who had campaigned against Pendergast both entered the race splitting the anti-Pendergast vote (the two combined had more votes than Truman).

During the General Election Truman was named Grand Master (Masonic) of the Grand Lodge of Freemasonry in Missouri in September 1940.

Truman was to say later that the election to become Grand Master was to be the deciding factor in the election over Davis:

I had a Catholic friend in St. Louis by the name of James E. Wade. He attended a meeting [where] Davis made his usual charges. Forrest Donnell, who afterwards became [Republican] Governor and Senator, was speaking from the same platform. Donnell was just behind me in the Grand Lodge line and would be Grand Master in a year or two.

So Jim Wade went up to him . . . and asked him if I could be the low sort of fellow that Davis charged and still be Grand Master of Masons of Missouri. Mr. Donnell said: 'No, Jim, he could not.' That ruined Mr. Davis—I won by 276,000 votes (or just 51.2% of the vote to Manvel's 48.7%)

Davis was born in Greensburg, Kansas. He died in Kansas City, Kansas and is buried in Mount Washington Cemetery in Kansas City.

Missouri House of Representatives
Preceded by James S. Summers	Member of the Missouri House of Representatives from the 10th Jackson district 1925–1929	Succeeded by Everett R. Meyer
Missouri Senate
Preceded by James S. Summers	Member of the Missouri Senate from the 7th district 1929–1933	Succeeded by Jerome M. Joffee
Party political offices
Preceded by James J. Barrett	Republican nominee for Lieutenant Governor of Missouri; 1936	Succeeded by William P. Elmer
Preceded by Roscoe C. Patterson	Republican nominee for U.S. Senator from Missouri (Class 1); 1940	Succeeded by James P. Kem
