= 1934 United States Senate election in Missouri =

- November 6, 1934
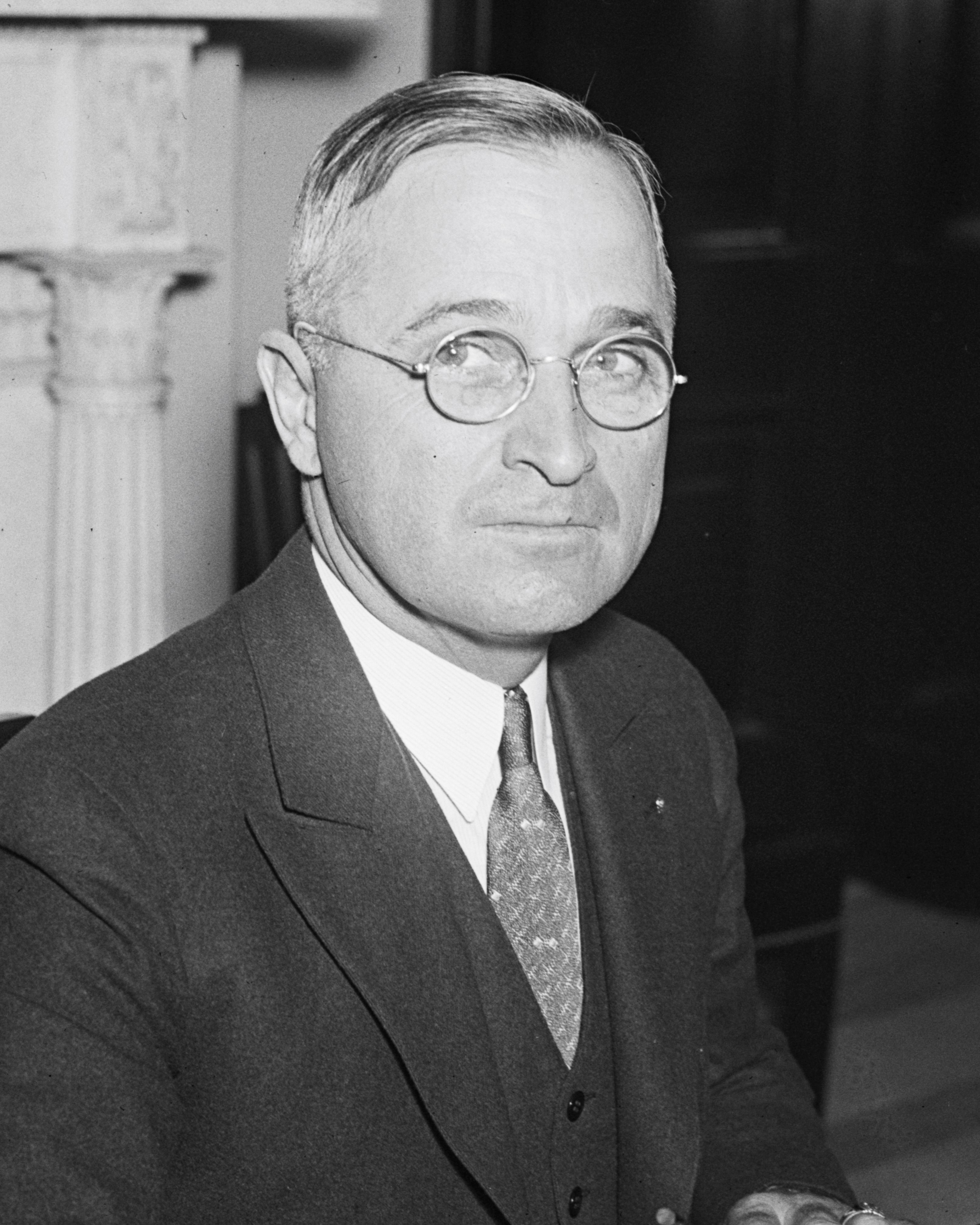

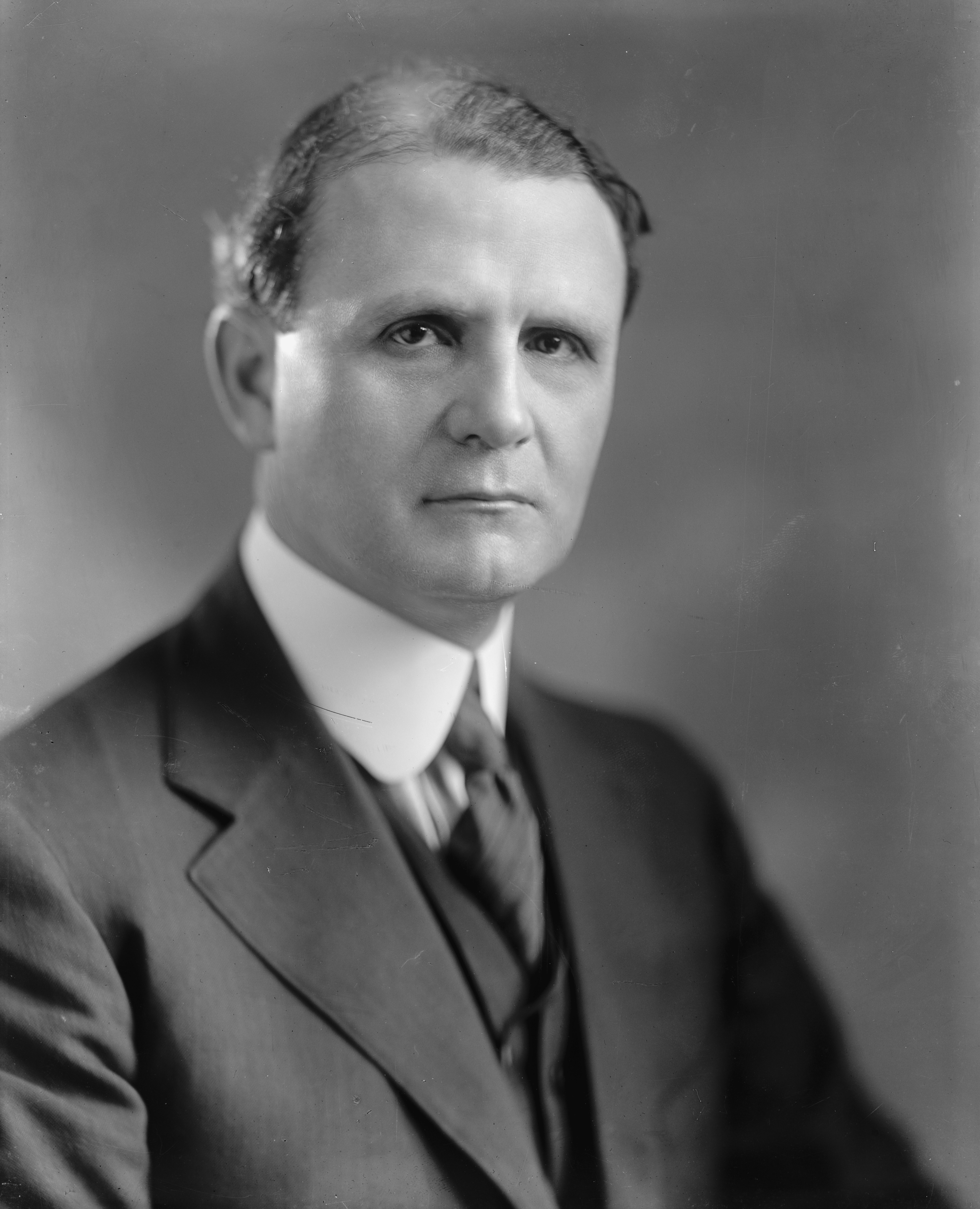
Nominee	Harry S. Truman	Roscoe C. Patterson
Party	Democratic	Republican
Popular vote	787,110	524,954
Percentage	59.55%	39.71%
- County results Truman: 40–50% 50–60% 60–70% 70–80% 80–90% >90% Patterson: 40–50% 50–60% 60–70% 70–80%
U.S. senator before election
Roscoe C. Patterson
Republican
Elected U.S. Senator
Harry S. Truman
Democratic

The 1934 United States Senate election in Missouri was held on November 6, 1934. Incumbent Republican U.S. Senator Roscoe Patterson, first elected in 1928, sought reelection to a second term. He was defeated by the Democratic candidate, future Vice President and President of the United States Harry Truman.

== Democratic primary ==
=== Candidates ===
- James Longstreet Cleveland
- John J. Cochran, U.S. Representative from St. Louis
- Jacob L. Milligan, U.S. Representative from Richmond
- Harry S. Truman, presiding judge of the Jackson County Court

=== Campaign ===
Harry Truman, having served as a judge, expressed an interest in running for the U.S. House of Representatives in 1934, but political boss Tom Pendergast had already selected another candidate for that race. After four other potential candidates had declined to run, Pendergast ultimately approached Truman to discuss a possible run for the United States Senate, to Truman's surprise. Truman, with backing from Pendergast, entered the Senate race. Truman said he would not, if elected, dictate to anyone, to the dismay of anti-Pendergast U.S. Senator Bennett Champ Clark.

Truman waged a statewide campaign and eventually won the largely three-way Democratic primary on August 7, 1934, by a significant margin, defeating U.S. Representatives John Cochran and Jacob Milligan.

=== Results ===
Primary results by county: Truman: 30–40%; 40–50%; 50–60%; 60–70%; >90%; Cochran: 30–40%; 40–50%; 50–60%; 60–70%; 70–80%; >90%; Milligan: 30–40%; 40–50%; 50–60%; 60–70%; 70–80%

1934 Democratic U.S. Senate primary
Party	Candidate	Votes	%
Democratic	Harry S. Truman	276,850	41.42%
Democratic	John J. Cochran	236,257	35.35%
Democratic	Jacob L. Milligan	147,631	22.09%
Democratic	James L. Cleveland	7,691	1.15%
Total votes		668,429	100

Nearly half of Truman's vote (137,529) came from Jackson County alone, where he received 92.8%. Likewise, Cochran received over half of his overall vote (121,048) from St. Louis and St. Louis County, where he led with 90.5% and 77.9%, respectively.

== General election ==
=== Results ===
Missouri United States Senate election, 1934
Party	Candidate	Votes	%
Democratic	Harry S. Truman	787,110	59.55%
Republican	Roscoe C. Patterson (incumbent)	524,954	39.71%
Socialist	W.C. Meyer	9,010	0.68%
Communist	Frank Brown	418	0.03%
Socialist Labor	William Wesley Cox	384	0.03%
Total votes		1,321,876	100.00%

== See also ==
- 1934 United States Senate elections
- List of United States senators from Missouri
