= List of elections in 1900 =

The following elections occurred in the year 1900.

== Europe ==
- 1900 Belgian general election
- 1900 Danish local elections
- 1900 Liechtenstein local elections
- 1900 Norwegian parliamentary election
- 1900 Portuguese legislative election
- 1900 Italian general election
- 1900 Swiss referendums

=== United Kingdom ===
- 1900 United Kingdom general election
- 1900 United Kingdom general election in Ireland
- 1900 United Kingdom general election in Scotland
- List of MPs elected in the 1900 United Kingdom general election
- 1900 Blackpool by-election
- 1900 Brixton by-election
- 1900 Dover by-election
- 1900 Dublin University by-election
- 1900 Edinburgh and St Andrews Universities by-election
- 1900 Guildford by-election
- 1900 Holborn by-election
- 1900 Isle of Wight by-election
- 1900 London University by-election
- 1900 Manchester South by-election
- 1900 Mid Armagh by-election
- 1900 North Monaghan by-election
- 1900 North Sligo by-election
- 1900 Plymouth by-election
- 1900 Portsmouth by-election
- 1900 Preston by-election
- 1900 Rossendale by-election
- 1900 South Mayo by-election
- 1900 West Derbyshire by-election
- 1900 Wellington (Somerset) by-election
- 1900 Wilton by-election
- 1900 Woodbridge by-election

== North America ==
=== Canada ===
- 1900 Canadian federal election
- 1900 British Columbia general election
- 1900 Edmonton municipal election
- 1900 Newfoundland general election
- 1900 Prince Edward Island general election
- 1900 Quebec general election
- 1900 Yukon general election

=== Caribbean ===
- 1900 Cuban local elections
- 1900 Cuban Constitutional Assembly election

=== United States ===
- 1900 United States presidential election
- 1900 United States elections
- 1900 New York state election

==== United States lieutenant gubernatorial ====
- 1900 Connecticut lieutenant gubernatorial election
- 1900 Illinois lieutenant gubernatorial election
- 1900 Minnesota lieutenant gubernatorial election
- 1900 Missouri lieutenant gubernatorial election
- 1900 Nebraska lieutenant gubernatorial election
- 1900 Texas lieutenant gubernatorial election
- 1900 Wisconsin lieutenant gubernatorial election

==== United States gubernatorial ====
- 1900 Alabama gubernatorial election
- 1900 Arkansas gubernatorial election
- 1900 Colorado gubernatorial election
- 1900 Connecticut gubernatorial election
- 1900 Delaware gubernatorial election
- 1900 Florida gubernatorial election
- 1900 Georgia gubernatorial election
- 1900 Idaho gubernatorial election
- 1900 Illinois gubernatorial election
- 1900 Indiana gubernatorial election
- 1900 Kansas gubernatorial election
- 1900 Kentucky gubernatorial special election
- 1900 Louisiana gubernatorial election
- 1900 Maine gubernatorial election
- 1900 Massachusetts gubernatorial election
- 1900 Michigan gubernatorial election
- 1900 Minnesota gubernatorial election
- 1900 Missouri gubernatorial election
- 1900 Montana gubernatorial election
- 1900 Nebraska gubernatorial election
- 1900 New Hampshire gubernatorial election
- 1900 New York gubernatorial election
- 1900 North Carolina gubernatorial election
- 1900 North Dakota gubernatorial election
- 1900 Rhode Island gubernatorial election
- 1900 South Carolina gubernatorial election
- 1900 South Dakota gubernatorial election
- 1900 Tennessee gubernatorial election
- 1900 Texas gubernatorial election
- 1900 United States gubernatorial elections
- 1900 Utah gubernatorial election
- 1900 Vermont gubernatorial election
- 1900 Washington gubernatorial election
- 1900 West Virginia gubernatorial election
- 1900 Wisconsin gubernatorial election

==== United States House of Representatives ====
- 1900 United States House of Representatives elections
- United States House of Representatives elections in California, 1900
- United States House of Representatives elections in Hawaii Territory, 1900
- United States House of Representatives elections in South Carolina, 1900

==== United States Senate ====
- 1899 and 1900 United States Senate elections
- 1900–01 United States Senate elections
- 1900 United States Senate special election in California
- 1900 United States Senate election in Kentucky

==== United States mayoral elections ====
- 1900 Los Angeles mayoral election
- 1900 Milwaukee mayoral election
- 1900 Portland, Oregon, mayoral election

== Oceania ==
=== New Zealand ===
- 1900 City of Auckland by-election
- 1900 Otaki by-election
- 1900 Waihemo by-election

== See also ==
- Category:1900 elections
