= 1900 Missouri lieutenant gubernatorial election =

- November 6, 1900
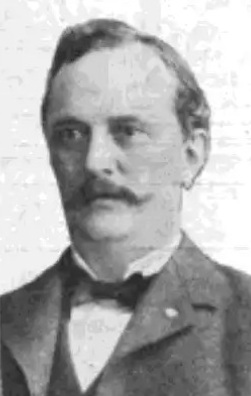

Nominee	John Adams Lee	Ethelbert F. Allen
Party	Democratic	Republican
Popular vote	352,505	314,352
Percentage	51.53%	45.95%
- County results Lee: 40–50% 50–60% 60–70% 70–80% 80–90% Allen: 40–50% 50–60% 60–70% 70–80%
Lieutenant Governor before election
August Bolte
Democratic
Elected Lieutenant Governor
John Adams Lee
Democratic

The 1900 Missouri lieutenant gubernatorial election was held on November 6, 1900, in order to elect the lieutenant governor of Missouri. Democratic nominee John Adams Lee defeated Republican nominee Ethelbert F. Allen, Social Democratic nominee Leon Greenbaum, Prohibition nominee Simpson Ely, People's Progressive nominee Abram Neff and Socialist Labor nominee J. F. Graber.

== General election ==
On election day, November 6, 1900, Democratic nominee John Adams Lee won the election by a margin of 38,153 votes against his foremost opponent Republican nominee Ethelbert F. Allen, thereby retaining Democratic control over the office of lieutenant governor. Lee was sworn in as the 24th lieutenant governor of Missouri on January 14, 1901.

=== Results ===
Missouri lieutenant gubernatorial election, 1900
Party	Candidate	Votes	%
Democratic	John Adams Lee	352,505	51.53
Republican	Ethelbert F. Allen	314,352	45.95
Social Democratic	Leon Greenbaum	6,048	0.88
Prohibition	Simpson Ely	5,685	0.83
Populist	Abram Neff	4,261	0.62
Socialist Labor	J. F. Graber	1,295	0.19
Total votes		684,146	100.00
Democratic hold			

== See also ==
- 1900 Missouri gubernatorial election
