= Commonwealth College (Arkansas) =

Socialist college in Arkansas

- Active: 1923–1940
- Founders: Kate Richards O'Hare, Frank P. O'Hare, William Edward Zeuch
- Location: Mena, Arkansas, United States

Commonwealth College (1923–1940) was a college started to recruit and train people to take the lead in socio-economic reform and prepare them for unconventional roles in a new and different society. An outgrowth of Job Harriman's New Llano Cooperative Colony in Louisiana, in 1923, William Zeuch, James McDonald, Kate Richards O'Hare, and Frank P. O'Hare joined with New Llano to found the institute in 1923. In the 1930s Commonwealth was essentially oriented towards training organizers for the rapidly growing labor movement. Tensions within the cooperative community led to a split, and Zeuch and Kate Richards and Frank P. O'Hare moved to Mena, Arkansas in December 1924, where the institution re-opened the next year.

== Name ==
The college's founders, who were members of the Socialist Party of America, named the school after the phrases "the cooperative commonwealth" and "the universal commonwealth", which were used by many party members to describe their vision of a post-capitalist society.

== History and approach ==
While campaigning for the Socialist Party of America, Kate Richards O'Hare and her husband Frank P. O'Hare met fellow activist William Zeuch, and the trio devised a plan for a college for workers who wished to develop their skills, as well as advance activism within the labor movement. They also envisioned for the college itself to double as a cooperative living space.

Commonwealth College aimed to recruit and train people to take the lead in social and economic reform and prepare them for unconventional roles in a new and different society. Students, staff, and faculty all worked together in the operation of the institution, from growing and preparing food to the construction and maintenance of buildings. Each student was required to donate 20 hours of labor per week either in the carpentry shop or in the fields, sometimes even driving a team of giant white Arkansas mules. There was much curiosity nationally about Commonwealth. As an example, Roger Nash Baldwin, long-time director of the American Civil Liberties Union, was an active member of its advisory board. This curiosity often led to financial contributions. Upton Sinclair, Louis Brandeis, and V.F. Calverton are among the notable donors to Commonwealth.

In 1926, the American Legion condemned the school, accusing it of being funded by the Soviet Union. These allegations, although later proven untrue, were later amplified by local newspapers, who also accused the school of promoting countercultural practices such as free love, as well as Bolshevism. Although the school remained segregated, and its attempts to hire black faculty failed, locals were concerned that the school was promoting racial equality.

In response to the poor relations with surrounding communities, Zeuch, who already exhibited socially conservative tendencies, attempted to implement a strict behavioral policy for students, which prohibited "inappropriate dress, language, interdormitory visits, drinking", and other types of behavior. However, these policies alienated many of the school's students. Divisions between the school's administrators and students were also exacerbated by differences over the school's curriculum. While Commonwealth's founders sought to equip students with a liberal arts education, many of the school's students, and some of their faculty, wanted more practical training, particularly in regards to labor activism.

Zeuch quit as director in 1931, when, after a student-led revolt, he accepted a Guggenheim Fellowship to study in Europe for a year and did not return. For the next six years, leadership of Commonwealth passed to Lucien Koch, who oversaw a curriculum shift which focused more on labor activism, journalism, public speaking, and labor law. Under Koch's administration, the school sought to integrate itself with local labor movements and activism, travelling throughout Arkansas, and to Illinois, Iowa, Oklahoma, and Kentucky to engage with local labor movements. Commonwealth College sent a delegation, which included Koch, to Harlan County in 1932, to support striking workers in the Harlan County War. These activities further enraged many locals, but began attracting a wider, and more militant, student body.

During this period, a number of students and faculty began turning away from the policies of the Socialist Party of America, and began joining and involving with the Communist Party, resulting in sharp divisions. Increasingly, students began criticizing Koch for refusing to affiliate with any political party, and, at one point, a group of communist students asked the administration to racially integrate. When this was refused, a strike was called by the communists. The strike lasted for a short time until the communist students and a few others left the school en masse for Chicago. This strike resulted in a fatal blow to Commonwealth College. Many students then at Commonwealth believed that bringing a black student into the school would result in serious trouble, if not a lynching, in the then all-white Polk County in which the school was located. Reportedly a black person had not stayed overnight for years.

In the early months of 1935, Koch would pledge loyalty to the Southern Tenant Farmers Union (STFU), a racially integrated sharecroppers' union, hoping that the sharecroppers' cause would help bring unity to Commonwealth. Through this collaboration with the STFU, delegations from Commonwealth would travel throughout Arkansas to help organize. In one such event, Koch and a student travelled to Gilmore, Arkansas to collaborate with black organizers, but were interrupted, beat, and kidnapped by a white mob. They were eventually let go, however, STFU leader H. L. Mitchell became concerned that the student with Koch was distributing Communist Party literature, harming the relationship between the STFU and Commonwealth College. Despite this, the relationship between the two continued, with STFU members enrolling at Commonwealth College, and STFU organizers teaching at the school.

In 1936, Lucien Koch stepped down as the school's director, and left Commonwealth College.

In August 1937, John Markey became educational director, while wife Dorothy Markey (Myra Page) taught English writing. Eleanor Roosevelt visited during their year there.

Christian socialist the Reverend Claude C. Williams, "the preaching hillbilly," then served as director from 1937 until 1940. During this period, several people identified with Commonwealth were actively involved with the Congress of Industrial Organizations (CIO). Education for racial tolerance was a key element of this campaign and Commonwealth developed theater and puppet programs for this purpose.

In response to Commonwealth's higher profile, right-wing pastors and legislators in Arkansas began targeting the school. A magazine article alleging ties with the Soviet Union, as well as a proposed state bill targeting the school with sedition, led to nationwide scrutiny of the school. In response, the STFU and the American Fund for Public Service launched a reluctant defense of Commonwealth College, although simultaneously attempting to persuade the school to become less radical. This led many of the school's students to become disillusioned with H. L. Mitchell and the STFU, and in 1938, a group of them attempted to write to the Communist Party to persuade them to provide material support to communist students. As a result, the STFU cut all ties with Commonwealth College. In 1938, the House Un-American Activities Committee was re-formed, and began targeting the American Civil Liberties Union, deeply impacting their ability to support Commonwealth.

From late 1938 to 1940, the school was hit with a series of financial setbacks, such as a fire which destroyed part of the school's campus, a declining student body, the departure of Claude C. Williams, and a series of fines imposed by the local government for charges such as failing to fly the American flag, for displaying a hammer and sickle, and for “anarchy”.

Weakened ties with traditional supporters and shaky finances led to proposals for merger with the Highlander Folk School or the operation of a drama center affiliated with the New Theatre League of New York City. However, these plans were thwarted by influential right-wing figures, legislators, and the American Legion. Ultimately the property was sold at a Polk County auction to satisfy fines levied against the institution. Material from the college's library deemed radical was confiscated, while other literature was donated to other local institutions.

Other labor schools were: Denver Labor College, Work People's College, Brookwood Labor College, Seattle Labor College, and Highlander Folk School. Commonwealth differed by offering college-level instruction.

== Campus ==
Due to a lack of funds, Commonwealth College lacked electricity and running water in its early days. During this time, classes were taught in the outdoors, or in the simple cottages which the school's faculty lived in.

== Student life ==
Students at Commonwealth College would typically take four hours of classes per day, labor at the school for an additional four or five hours, and spend the remaining time studying or partaking in recreational activities. Common recreational activities for students at Commonwealth included baseball, tennis, and volleyball, swimming, hiking, picnicking, and foraging. On Saturday nights, the school held a dance, which attracted youths from nearby areas. Folklorist Vance Randolph noted that these dances were remarkable in that their participants danced in traditional southern styles, but due to the influx of northern students, also included dances common in northern cities, as well as various European folk dances. On Sunday evenings, the college's faculty and visiting socialists gave lectures to Commonwealth students, which were also open to the local public. Students and faculty at Commonwealth College often grew much of their own food, with much of the remaining food sourced from local farms. Many students at Commonwealth were in their twenties, with significant work experience, leading to students and faculty typically having a relationship "as equals". Students typically ate dinner together, alongside faculty. These dinners were often the medium for extensive political and philosophical debates.

== Faculty ==
Faculty at Commonwealth College were unpaid, simply receiving room and board.

Notable faculty include F.M. Goodhue (mathematics and statistics), Covington Hall (labor history), Wilbur Clarke Benton (history and law), Kate Richards O'Hare, Bill Cunningham (journalism), John E. Kirkpatrick (author of the American College and Its Rulers, taught labor economics one term), Charlotte Koch (typing, executive secretary), Clay Fulks (law and agricultural problems), E.C. Wilson, Earl C. Hamilton (comparative religions), George Yeisley Rusk, and Lucien Koch.

== Alumni ==
- Gordon McIntire and Reuben Cole, two of the leaders of the Louisiana Farmers' Union.
- Agnes "Sis" Cunningham, co-founder of the Almanac Singers and The Weavers.
- Lee Hays, co-founder of the Almanac Singers, The Weavers, and Broadside Magazine.
- Kenneth Patchen, a well-known poet and artist.
- Orval Faubus, governor of Arkansas from 1955 to 1967.

== See also ==
- Almanac Singers
- Congress of Industrial Organizations
- Folk High School
- N. F. S. Grundtvig
- Lee Hays
- Highlander Folk School
  - Southern Appalachian Labor School (since 1977)
- The Weavers
