= 1884 Missouri lieutenant gubernatorial election =

- November 4, 1884
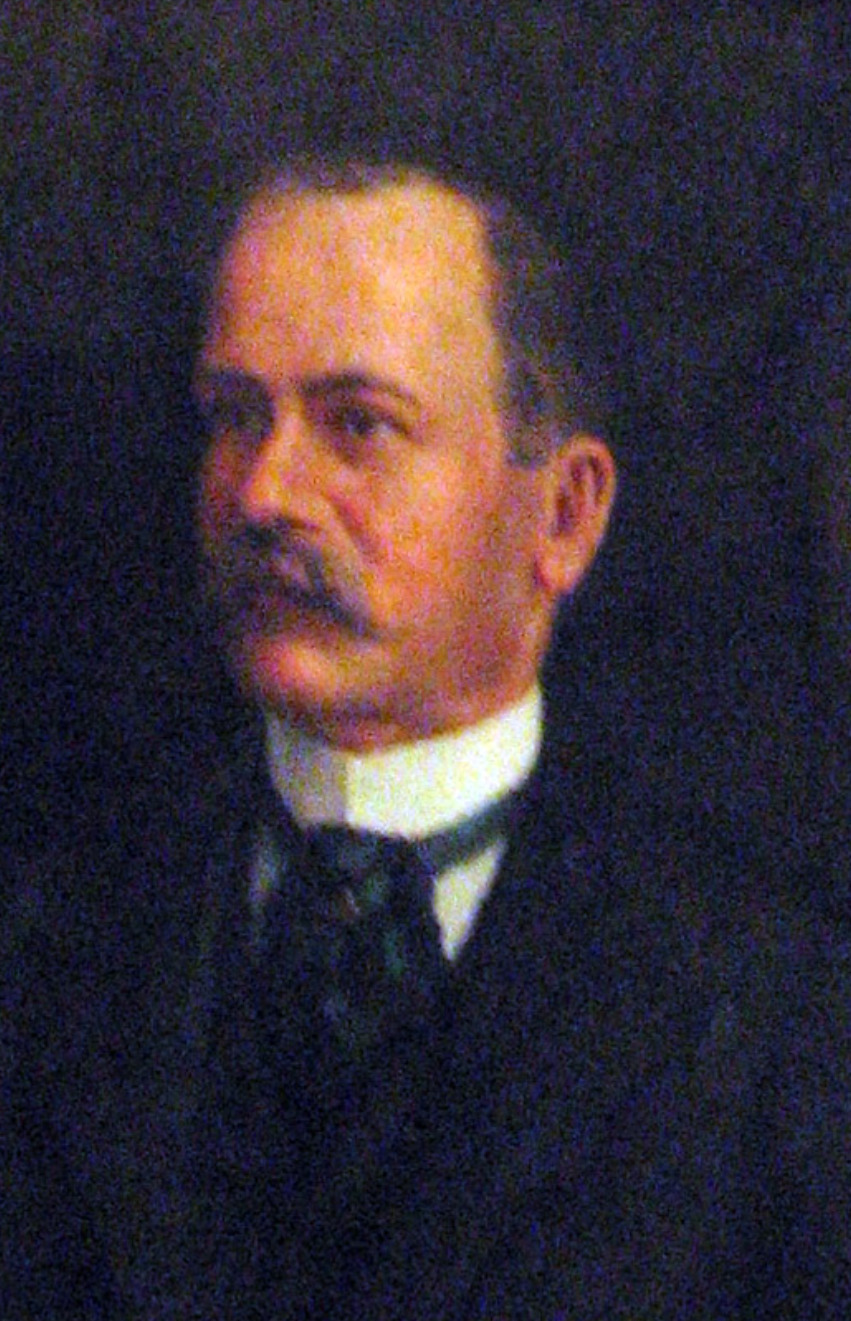

Nominee	Albert P. Morehouse	H. M. Starkloff
Party	Democratic	Republican
Popular vote	232,911	203,149
Percentage	52.74%	46.00%
Lieutenant Governor before election
Robert Alexander Campbell
Democratic
Elected Lieutenant Governor
Albert P. Morehouse
Democratic

The 1884 Missouri lieutenant gubernatorial election was held on November 4, 1884, in order to elect the lieutenant governor of Missouri. Democratic nominee Albert P. Morehouse defeated Republican nominee H. M. Starkloff and People's nominee Henry Eshbaugh.

== General election ==
On election day, November 4, 1884, Democratic nominee Albert P. Morehouse won the election by a margin of 29,762 votes against his foremost opponent Republican nominee H. M. Starkloff, thereby retaining Democratic control over the office of lieutenant governor. Morehouse was sworn in as the 20th lieutenant governor of Missouri on January 12, 1885.

=== Results ===
Missouri lieutenant gubernatorial election, 1884
Party	Candidate	Votes	%
Democratic	Albert P. Morehouse	232,911	52.74
Republican	H. M. Starkloff	203,149	46.00
Populist	Henry Eshbaugh	5,528	1.26
Total votes		441,588	100.00
Democratic hold			

== See also ==
- 1884 Missouri gubernatorial election
