= William Edward Zeuch =

American educator

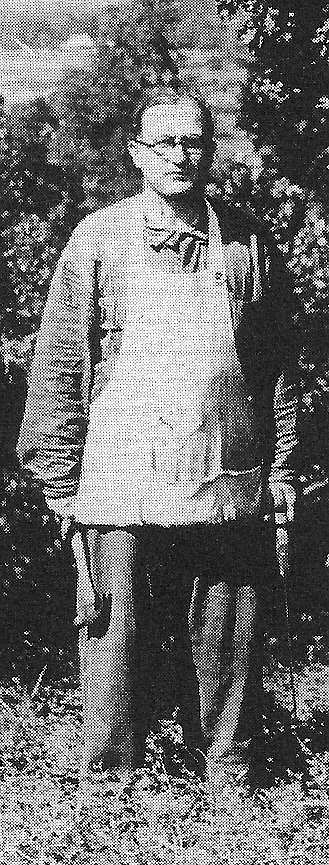
Zeuch c. 1926

William Edward Zeuch (April 19, 1892 – November 24, 1968) was an American socialist, educator, and academic who is best known as a founder and first director of the Commonwealth College in Arkansas. This college is the most well known attempt in Arkansas at establishing a radical labor educational school.

== Personal life ==
Zeuch was born on April 19, 1892, in Strawberry Point Iowa.

He was first and foremost an American academic, holding many degrees from various institutions that he would apply in various educational positions. He held an A.B from Lenox College, a M.A. from Clark University, and a PhD from University of Wisconsin. Before serving as the Director of Commonwealth College (1923–31), Zeuch first taught Economics at Indiana University from 1917 to 1918, and then at University of Illinois from 1922 to 1923.

== Commonwealth College ==
William Zeuch co-founded the Commonwealth College and served as its first director from 1923 until he was ousted by an increasingly radical and ultimately self-destructive sect of the College in 1931.

In 1917, at Ruskin College in Florida, along with the husband and wife combination of Kate Richards O'Hare and Frank O'Hare, Zuech created the basis for a school that would focus on educating the future leaders of an emerging class of workers. Ruskin College stood as the model to be tweaked by Zuech and the O'Hares, who were strong followers of socialist Eugene Debs.

Zuech’s personal philosophy was based on theoretical labor education and influenced the non-partisanship that was included in the mission of Commonwealth College. Despite this, in 1926, charges of communism fell down on Zuech and Commonwealth and an FBI investigation was set into motion. FBI Commissioner J. Edgar Hoover exonerated the school due to lack of evidence supporting the claims, but Zuech’s mission to keep a non-partisan, non factional, and uncontroversial education space would never fully be realized after being connected to the “Red” Communist ideas.

== Later years ==
In 1931, he was awarded a Guggenheim Fellowship.

Newspaper reports show that Zeuch applied to run in the 4th Congressional District in 1932, noting that he was presently somewhere in Europe.

In September 1932, Zeuch attempted to start a new labor school in the region called "Skyline School of the Ozarks." After this effort failed, Zeuch served in the Franklin Roosevelt administration serving in the Department of the Interior and then the Department of Agriculture. During this period he was a "cooperative specialist" and then "chief of initiation and planning" in the division of subsistence homesteads as cooperative counsel to the Resettlement Administration.

From 1937-1940, Zeuch worked as an economic and educational expert for agencies of the Mexican government.

In 1940, Zeuch was accused in Oklahoma of supporting the political workers of Michael Shadid with illegal campaign money.

Zeuch worked in Alabama from 1941-1943. During this period he held himself out as the Director of the "School of Organic Education" in Fairhope, Alabama.

Zeuch died in Los Angeles, California on November 24, 1968. and is buried at the Los Angeles National Cemetery.
