= Socialist Party of Missouri =

Missouri state section of the Socialist Party of America (SPA)

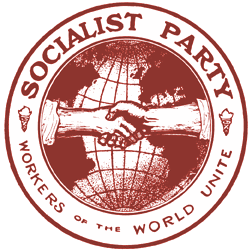
The Socialist Party of Missouri was a state affiliate of the Socialist Party of America, established in 1901.

The Socialist Party of Missouri was the Missouri state section of the Socialist Party of America (SPA), an organization originally established in 1901 as a federation of semi-autonomous state organizations. The Missouri organization was the direct lineal descendant of the Social Democratic Party of Missouri, which emerged in 1898.

The Socialist Party of Missouri was centered in the city of St. Louis, which was at the time of formation of the SPA the fourth most populous city in America and home to a large German-American immigrant community. Growth of the party was bolstered by the newspaper St. Louis Labor, a prominent weekly with a significant circulation among the organized labor movement of the city.

The Socialist Party of Missouri remained active throughout the Great Depression decade of the 1930s and into the 1940s, before atrophying and losing critical mass. The party's archives were donated to the Missouri Historical Society in 1964.

== Organizational history ==
=== Background ===
Missouri is located near the geographic center of the United States and shares a long common border with the Socialist Party hotbed of Illinois.

At the turn of the 20th century, the Midwestern city of St. Louis was a prominent center of American commerce and manufacturing. The city's population of just over 575,000 people made St. Louis the fourth largest city in the United States, following New York City, Chicago, and Philadelphia.

In 1850 St. Louis was largely an immigrant city, with more than half of its citizens born outside of the United States, including most importantly ethnic Germans and Irish. This percentage of foreign-born residence tailed off over time as the immigrants laid down roots and raised families, falling to 18% by 1910. Nevertheless, the city retained a strong ethnic character, with its population supplemented by Italians, Eastern European Jews, Czechs, Poles, and other nationalities as waves of immigrants arrived and were integrated into the American economy as wage workers.

The city's ethnic German population remained its substantial component, with first generation immigrants from Germany and their offspring comprising 56 percent of the city's population in 1900. Those of German heritage remained the city's majority ethnicity at least through the census of 1910.

St. Louis was served by scores of German cultural organizations, including an array of German-language newspapers, fraternal organizations, social clubs, singing societies, and a German teacher-training school. Included among these were socialist political societies, some of whom were organized into a city section of the Socialist Labor Party of America (SLP) in the early 1880s. A party press soon followed, including the German-language weekly Arbeiter Zeitung (Workers' Newspaper) and the English-language Missouri Socialist — the name of which was later changed to St. Louis Labor.

=== Social Democratic Party of America in Missouri ===
Leon Greenbaum, Social Democratic candidate for Mayor of St. Louis in 1901 and first Executive Secretary of the Socialist Party of America.

Two organizations, each styling itself as the Social Democratic Party of America (SDP), emerged during the last years of the 1890s. The first was based in Chicago and headed by Milwaukee publisher Victor L. Berger, American Railway Union organizer Eugene V. Debs, his brother Theodore Debs and emerged as a factional splinter of the Social Democracy of America, an organization which sought to establish a socialist colony in a Western state.

Despite its Midwestern locus and focus, this Chicago organization was essentially unrepresented in Missouri, however. Instead the small Social Democratic Party of Missouri which emerged in St. Louis soon affiliated itself to a rival Social Democratic Party of America with headquarters in Springfield, Massachusetts. This Eastern organization, headed by William Butscher as National Secretary and including New York attorneys Henry L. Slobodin and Morris Hillquit among its top leaders, was formed as the result of a split of the orthodox Marxist Socialist Labor Party of America.

At the time of its emergence late in 1898, the SDP claimed about 75 members in St. Louis, who were joined by "a small handful" in Kansas City. Significant growth followed. By the end of 1900 the Missouri SDP could claim a membership of 700, of whom 210 lived in St. Louis, 110 in Kansas City, 90 in Sedalia, with the rest scattered across locals in 24 other towns around the state, such as Pleasant Hill, Webb City, Milan, and Harrisonville. Other Missouri towns with Social Democratic Party locals included Bevier and Poplar Bluff.

Local St. Louis was further subdivided into no fewer than 7 "branches," these established on a geographic basis according to voting wards. Each of these ward branches met twice monthly, with the local meeting as a whole at least once a month. Party dues were 25 cents per month, plus 10 cents a quarter for a subscription to the party's official newspaper.

The SDP fielded an extensive slate of candidates in the November 1900 general election, including Caleb Lipscomb for Governor, St. Louis trade union writer and lecturer Leon Greenbaum for Lieutenant Governor, and William M. Brandt for State Treasurer. In the 1900 elections the SDP emerged as the third most successful party in Missouri, gaining more votes than its orthodox Marxist rival, the Socialist Labor Party of America, as well as the People's Party and Prohibition Party in the polls. The margin between it and the so-called "old parties" — the Republican Party and Democratic Party — was vast, however, with the SDP's candidates for Congress generally receiving approximately 1% of the total vote.

=== Establishment of the Socialist Party of America ===
William M. Brandt, frequent candidate for public office of the Socialist Party of Missouri, as he appeared in 1913.

In the summer of 1901 the two Social Democratic Parties joined with smaller groups and independent individuals to establish a new multi-tendency political organization known as the Socialist Party of America (SPA). St. Louis was chosen as the headquarters city for the new organization and Leon Greenbaum of that city was selected as the group's first Executive Secretary. Members of Local St. Louis served as members of the organization's first executive body, known as the Local Quorum, which handled day-to-day operations of the largely decentralized organization.

Largely in response to perceived lack of democracy and other deficiencies of the highly centralized SLP, the SPA was initially established as a somewhat loose confederation of largely autonomous state organizations, of which the Socialist Party of Missouri was one. Missouri contained a significant number of committed socialist adherents at the time of the party's formation in 1901, with the large circulation weekly Appeal to Reason noting in November 1901 that it had more than 9,000 subscribers in the state — fourth most of any state, following California, Ohio, and Illinois.

According to the first constitution of the Socialist Party of Missouri, the primary unit of party organization, generally known as a "Local" across America, was designated as a "Club." At the end of November 1901 the fledgling Socialist Party of Missouri counted 21 clubs in the state, according to State Secretary-Treasurer Val Putnam, with a paid membership of "about 500." The former "ward branches" of the city of St. Louis were designated as "ward clubs" in the lingo of the new party organization. In addition to the geographically based ward clubs, based upon electoral districts, there was also from the fall of 1901 a "Women's Socialist Club" in the city of St. Louis. By February 1902 the number of Socialist Party clubs with official state charters had grown to 31, "with new applications coming in every week."

The first state convention of the Socialist Party of Missouri, held in Sedalia in October 1901, voted to accept the donation of the weekly Missouri Socialist in order to make it a party-owned official organ. After passing the paper to state control the St. Louis club — far and away the largest such organization in the state — determined that it needed a special city edition of the paper to better serve its organizational needs. This new city edition was to be known as St. Louis Labor and was intended "to deal largely with trade union matters."

The new St. Louis city edition, which almost immediately supplanted the Missouri Socialist from whence it sprung, was formally launched in the third week of December 1901. In addition to an increasing number of stories related to the national trade union movement, the revised and expanded publication featured dozens of meeting announcements for the union locals of St. Louis together with Socialist Party meeting information in an effort to more closely join the trade union "economic" and Socialist Party "political" wings of the workers movement. The deemphasis of the word "socialism" in both title and content of the publication resulted in increased participation by advertisers and a doubling of the paper's physical size, from four pages to eight.

=== Move of national headquarters ===
The location of the Socialist Party's national headquarters in St. Louis was not satisfactory to all party members and the idea of moving to another city soon took root. Particular dissatisfaction was expressed by the more radical elements in the party, who objected to the tendency of the St. Louis Local Quorum towards "fusionism" — joint action with non-socialist political parties. At the 1903 annual meeting of the governing National Committee of the SPA, held in St. Louis from January 29 to 31, these anti-St. Louis elements won the day, and the National Committee voted to move party headquarters to Omaha, Nebraska — a state firmly controlled by the radical wing. Headquarters were moved shortly thereafter for what would prove to be a brief stint in Omaha before a permanent home would ultimately be found in the industrial mecca of Chicago.

=== Electoral growth ===
St. Louis Labor editor G.A. Hoehn was one of the most influential members of the Socialist Party of Missouri during its period of greatest strength.

The Socialist Party of Missouri showed its greatest growth during the decade of the 1910s. Growth of the Socialist Party in Missouri was bolstered by regular weekly newspapers published in St. Louis from the late 1890s until 1930. These periodicals, St. Louis Labor and the privately owned German-language Arbeiter Zeitung, attempted to popularize socialist ideas and publicized the party's frequent ward branch meetings. Starting in 1912 the party additionally published a propaganda paper in conjunction with election campaigns called Voice of the People, having directly imported the idea from the successful Social-Democratic Party of Wisconsin, which managed to win the office of mayor of Milwaukee as well as a majority of the city council in the election of 1911.

The Socialist Party showed impressive growth in the state of Missouri throughout the first decade of the 20th century. By 1908 some 135 Socialist locals dotted the state of Missouri, while organized Socialist branches existed in 24 of St. Louis's 28 electoral wards, bolstered by specialized branches targeted to women and Yiddish-speaking immigrant workers. Hungarian and Polish-speaking branches were soon to follow, as well as a Croatian-language branch in December 1909. There was also a German-language Socialist Singing Society, the St. Louis Arbeiter Saengerbund, which in addition to providing recreation also provided nominal help to financially supporting the city's socialist press. In subsequent years there would also be St. Louis Socialist branches which conducted their business in Lithuanian, Latvian, Czech, Italian, Slovenian, and Yiddish.

This expansion of the organization's structure found a parallel expression in an apparent growth in curiosity in the Socialist Party's ideas by those outside the group's formal ranks. In October 1908 an enthusiastic crowd of 7,000 people turned out to pack the city's Armory Hall to hear Socialist presidential candidate Eugene V. Debs — with another 5,000 more turned away at the door for lack of seats. Outside the auditorium labor organizer "Mother" Mary Harris Jones and other socialist speakers addressed approximately 4,000 listeners at an impromptu overflow meeting.

The party's 1911 platform for the city of St. Louis called for municipal ownership of public utilities, the streetcar system, ice plants, and lodging houses. It also endorsed the establishment of public works projects for unemployed workers, a public employment office to connect unemployed workers with potential employers, and city-owned farmers' markets.

On an electoral basis, the years 1911 and 1912 were the high-water mark for the Socialist Party of Missouri in St. Louis, always the main enclave of the organization. In that year three of the party's candidates for city council received more than 11,000 votes each and the party elected a candidate to the St. Louis Board of Education. The party argued that in two wards it had been cheated out of election by systematic undercounting of its vote, with G. A. Hoehn and William M. Brandt narrowly falling to their Republican opponents. Future prospects still seemed bright.

=== The period of decline ===
In 1914 the city of St. Louis moved to a new city charter which introduced the principle of at-large representation to the city council. Rather than being elected on the basis of ethnically and economically homogeneous wards, council members accumulated votes from residents of the entire city — a change which severely undercut any realistic chance for the Socialist Party to win election to the city council. While ultimately unsuccessful in electing even a single candidate to the city council, let alone in capturing the mayorship — as had been done in the predominantly German-American city of Milwaukee to the North — by 1914 the Socialist Party of Missouri nevertheless counted about 1,200 party members in the city of St. Louis alone.

The party's slow but steady membership growth failed to correspond to electoral success, however. In the April 1915 municipal election in St. Louis, despite having run a full slate of 28 candidates for the Board of Aldermen, the Socialist Party suffered a crushing losses across the board — a result which even the upbeat party press proclaimed "a complete defeat for the working class!" Every seat was won by the Republican candidate with the magnitude of the Socialist loss typified by the vote count for President of the Board of Aldermen, in which the Republican nominee captured over 61,000 votes, the Democratic runner-up just under 39,000 votes, and the Socialist candidate just 4,131.

In 1916 St. Louis became the first American city to pass by popular vote an ordinance requiring racial segregation in housing. The Socialists went on record in opposition to the proposed measure and worked against it, ultimately having little impact when the measure nevertheless passed by a landslide margin of nearly 3-to-1. The measure was ultimately never implemented however, with the United States Supreme Court striking down as unconstitutional St. Louis-style block segregation.

The downward spiral of the Socialist Party of Missouri continued in the fall of 1916 when its candidate for Governor, William J. Adames, netted approximately 3,600 votes out of a total of more than 160,000 cast in the city of St. Louis — little more than 2% of the total, and this in the urban center of the Missouri party's strength. Though party editor G. A. Hoehn attempted to put a happy face on this dismal result, declaring in a headline the party remained "More Encouraged Than Ever," it was clear even before American entry into World War I that the Socialist Party's moment had passed and that there would be no Milwaukee-style Socialist administration in the city of St. Louis.

=== Emergency National Convention ===
In April 1917 St. Louis played host to a seminal Emergency National Convention of the Socialist Party of America. The gathering assembled at the Planters Hotel on the morning of Saturday, April 7, with 172 elected delegates representing the Socialist Parties of 43 states in attendance. The gathering was controversially called by the governing National Executive Committee of the SPA to make clear the Socialist Party's position on American entry into World War I, despite the fact that the NEC had no constitutional authority to convene such a gathering without a referendum vote of the party. In the interval between the calling and convening of the St. Louis Emergency Convention, the United States Congress declared war on Germany at the behest of President Woodrow Wilson.

Fifteen delegates were elected to constitute a Committee on War and Militarism, charged with writing an official policy statement of the Socialist Party on the war and America's part in it. This committee met continuously for three days, including night sessions, ultimately appointing a subcommittee consisting of moderates Morris Hillquit and Algernon Lee of New York and radical C. E. Ruthenberg of Ohio to draft the final resolution.

This subcommittee returned with a lengthy and radical document, which reaffirmed the SPA's "unalterable opposition to the war just declared by the government of the United States," branding American entry "a crime against the people of the United States and against the nations of the world." The resolution pledged the Socialist Party to "continuous, active, and public opposition to the war, through demonstrations, mass petitions, and all other means within our power" and promised to conduct "consistent propaganda against military training" and "vigorous resistance" to "all reactionary measures," such as conscription, postal and press censorship, and restrictions upon free speech and freedom of assembly.

Later ratified by vote of the rank-and-file of the Socialist Party, the so-called "St. Louis Resolution on War and Militarism" became one of the controversial hallmarks of Socialist Party policy during the superheated wartime political climate of 1917–18.

=== Legacy ===
The papers of the Socialist Party of Missouri, including material dated from 1909 to 1964, resides at the State Historical Society of Missouri. The material includes published pamphlets and leaflets, correspondence files, periodicals, and newspaper clippings in 98 archival folders. The material has also been microfilmed in 10 reels.

== State conventions ==
The Socialist Party of Missouri was governed by biannual conventions of its dues-paying members.

1901 convention

The first state convention of the Socialist Party of Missouri was scheduled to be gaveled open in Sedalia on October 19, 1901. In the wake of the assassination of President William McKinley by an anarchist the previous month, a small "red scare" swept America, threatening to scuttle the socialist convention. A conservative businessmen's organization, the Sedalia Citizens' Alliance, organized a boycott of the socialists by local landlords, who refused to rent any hall or vacant building for conduct of the convention. With the scheduled date just weeks away, convention organizers made plans to rent a vacant lot in downtown Sedalia and to erect there a big-top tent capable of seating 1,000 people.

At the eleventh hour the organized boycott was broken by a local lodge of the Knights of Pythias, who allowed the rental of their massive storeroom in downtown Sedalia, capable of seating 1,000. An initial mass meeting was held Friday, October 18, and was addressed by prominent socialist lecturer Walter Thomas Mills. At 10:30 am the next day the regular convention began on schedule and was conducted without a hitch. Constitutional revisions were debated, resolutions passed, and officers elected for the Socialist Party of Missouri, with St. Louis newspaper editor E. Val Putnam elected the first State Secretary of the organization and Chairman of the State Committee George H. Turner tapped as the state's representative to the Socialist Party's governing National Committee.

Following conclusion of the convention another mass meeting was held, accompanied by a brass band, packing the 1,000 seat venue. Owing to a delay in the arrival of the keynote speaker, former Social Democratic Party presidential candidate Eugene V. Debs, Walter Thomas Mills again addressed the crowd, holding it until the 9 pm arrival of Debs. Debs entered the room accompanied by the strains of "The Marseillaise" and was met with thunderous ovations before and after the delivery of his 90-minute speech.

1908 convention

The 1908 state convention was held in mid-September in the state capital of Jefferson City. The Socialists were one of five political parties in the city holding simultaneous political conventions. The convention heard a presentation from the Woman's Suffrage League of St. Louis and responded with a resolution pledging the Socialist Party of Missouri to "do all in its power to bring about the enactment of a law by the General Assembly of Missouri granting woman's suffrage." The convention confirmed the State Secretary, Chairman, and Treasurer elected by the party rank-and-file in a referendum held at the first of the year, a move necessitated by a new state law which mandated election of officers by the state committees of political parties. A new platform was adopted which declared the American people to be in the midst of "the most radical and far-reaching political realignment in the history of our country" and announced itself for "the abolition of the wage and profit system."

1916 convention

The 1916 state convention was held in St. Louis from Aug. 19-20. The gathering was held at Barr Library Auditorium, with 25 delegates reported by the Credentials Committee and answering the opening roll call. State Secretary Otto Vierling delivered a keynote report to the gathering and committees on Ways and Means, Platform and Resolutions, and Constitution were elected. A state platform was passed, Presidential electors chosen, and resolutions passed, including a call for creation of a state Domestic Relations Commission patterned after a similar institution established in Chicago in 1911. This institution was to attempt to reconcile couples threatening divorce, and in the event this was unsuccessful, to report to the court factually on the situation so that a remedy could be achieved "without the interference of a lawyer."

A banquet was held the first evening of the conclave, attended by 200 guests, who heard a series of speeches by Missouri Socialist worthies. A planned mass meeting the following evening was less successful, disrupted by an approaching evening storm which seems to have severely dampened turnout.

1918 convention

The 1918 state convention was held in St. Louis at the Barr Branch Library Auditorium, located at the intersection of Lafayette and Jefferson Avenues, on Tuesday, August 27. The conclave was opened by representative of the State Committee Otto Pauls. The chief activity of the gathering was the drafting of a state platform for the fall 1918 Socialist Party campaign, with a five-member committee which included party veterans Caleb Lipscomb, William Lincoln Garver, and G.A. Hoehn elected to construct the basic document. An evening session approved the work of this committee with slight amendments, discussing each plank individually and in sequence.

The following night a mass meeting was held under the auspices of the Socialist Party of St. Louis, with State Secretary William Garver chairing the event. Keynote speakers were Adolph Germer, National Executive Secretary of the Socialist Party of America, and Caleb Lipscomb, the party's candidate for United States Senate. William Bross Lloyd, candidate for U.S. Senate in neighboring Illinois also addressed the gathering.

1933 convention

The 1933 convention was held in St. Louis on September 4 of that year. The gathering adopted a revised constitution for the organization.

1934 convention

The party held biannual platform conventions through the 1930s. The 1934 convention was held September 16–17 in Jefferson City, which named George E. Duemler of St. Louis was elected at State Secretary and J.C. Hodges of Kansas City was elected State Chairman. A platform was passed which called for "the orderly transfer of banks and public utilities, natural resources and key industries to social ownership and democratic management."

== Key members ==
- E. T. Behrens
- William M. Brandt
- William Lincoln Garver
- Leon Greenbaum
- L.E. Hildebrand
- Joseph Hauser
- G.A. "Gus" Hoehn
- Otto Kaemmerer
- Caleb Lipscomb
- Frank P. O'Hare
- Kate Richards O'Hare
- Otto Pauls
- L. G. Pope
- E. Val Putnam
- Otto Vierling
- Phil Wagner

== See also ==
- Non-English press of the Socialist Party of America
- Socialist Party of North Dakota
- Socialist Party of Oklahoma
- Socialist Party of Oregon
- Socialist Party of Washington
- Social-Democratic Party of Wisconsin

== Socialist press ==
Note: This alphabetical list includes privately owned and party-owned publications associated the Socialist Party of America and its predecessor organizations.

- Arbeiter-Zeitung und Volks-Anwalt (Workers' Newspaper and People's Advocate, 1898–1930)
- The Bulletin (1935–1937)
- The Call to Action (1933)
- The Melting Pot (1913–1919)
- The Missouri Rebel (1935)
- Missouri Socialist / St. Louis Labor (1901–1930)
- National Rip-Saw (St. Louis) (1908–1918)
- Scott County Kicker (Benton) (Socialist from 1906 to 1917)
- St. Louis Labor (1893–1896)
- Socialist Party Bulletin (1956–1957)
- St. Louis Tageblatt (St. Louis Daily Gazette) (1888–1897)
- Voice of the People (1912-???) —Election special editions.
- Volkstimme des Westens (People's Voice of the West) (c. 1877-c. 1880)

== Party documents ==
- "Constitution of Local St. Louis of the Social Democratic Party of America (Adopted August 5, 1900)." Corvallis, OR: 1000 Flowers Publishing, 2014.
- "Constitution of the Socialist Party of St. Louis: Adopted August 26, 1901." Corvallis, OR: 1000 Flowers Publishing, 2014.

== SPM average paid memberships ==
Year	Average Paid Membership	Exempt Members	National SPA Membership
1901	"about 500"	n/a	4,759 paid (of 7,629)
1902	139	n/a	9,949
1903		n/a	15,975
1904		n/a	20,763
1905		n/a	23,327
1906		n/a	26,784
1907		n/a	29,270
1908		n/a	41,751
1909	1,183	n/a	41,470
1910		n/a	58,011
1911		n/a	84,716
1912		n/a	118,045
1913			95,957
1914			93,579
1915			79,374
1916	1,298		83,284
1917	1,332		80,379
1918	1,620 (first 6 mos.)		82,344
1919			104,822
1920			26,766
1921			13,484
1922			11,019
1923			10,662
1924			10,125
1925			8,558
1926			8,392
1927			7,425
1928			7,793
1929			9,560
1930			9,736
1931			10,389
1932			16,863
1933			18,548
1934			20,951
1935			19,121
1936			11,922

Sources: Carl D. Thompson, "The Rising Tide of Socialism," The Socialist (Columbus, OH), Aug. 12, 1911, pg. 2; 1901 estimate from Missouri Socialist, Nov. 30, 1901, pg. 4 and St. Louis Labor, Feb. 22, 1902; "Dues Paid Last Year," The Worker, March 22, 1903, pg. 4; Socialist Party Official Bulletin and successors, Executive Secretary state-by-state membership summaries, January issues; 1909 figure from Socialist Party Official Bulletin, April 1910, pg. 4; "Socialist Party Official Membership Series,' (1932). Report to 1937 Convention, cited in "Socialist Party of America Annual Membership Figures," Early American Marxism website. "Exempt" members denote those receiving special dispensation from the state office due to unemployment starting 1913. Adoloph Germer, Report of Executive Secretary to the National Executive Committee: Chicago, Illinois — Aug. 8, 1918, pp. 5-6.
