= Claycomb =

Claycomb is a surname. Notable people with the surname include:

- Laura Claycomb (born 1968), American operatic singer
- Stephen Hugh Claycomb (1847–1930), American politician and attorney
- Troy Claycomb, American politician
