= 1916 Missouri Attorney General election =

- November 7, 1916
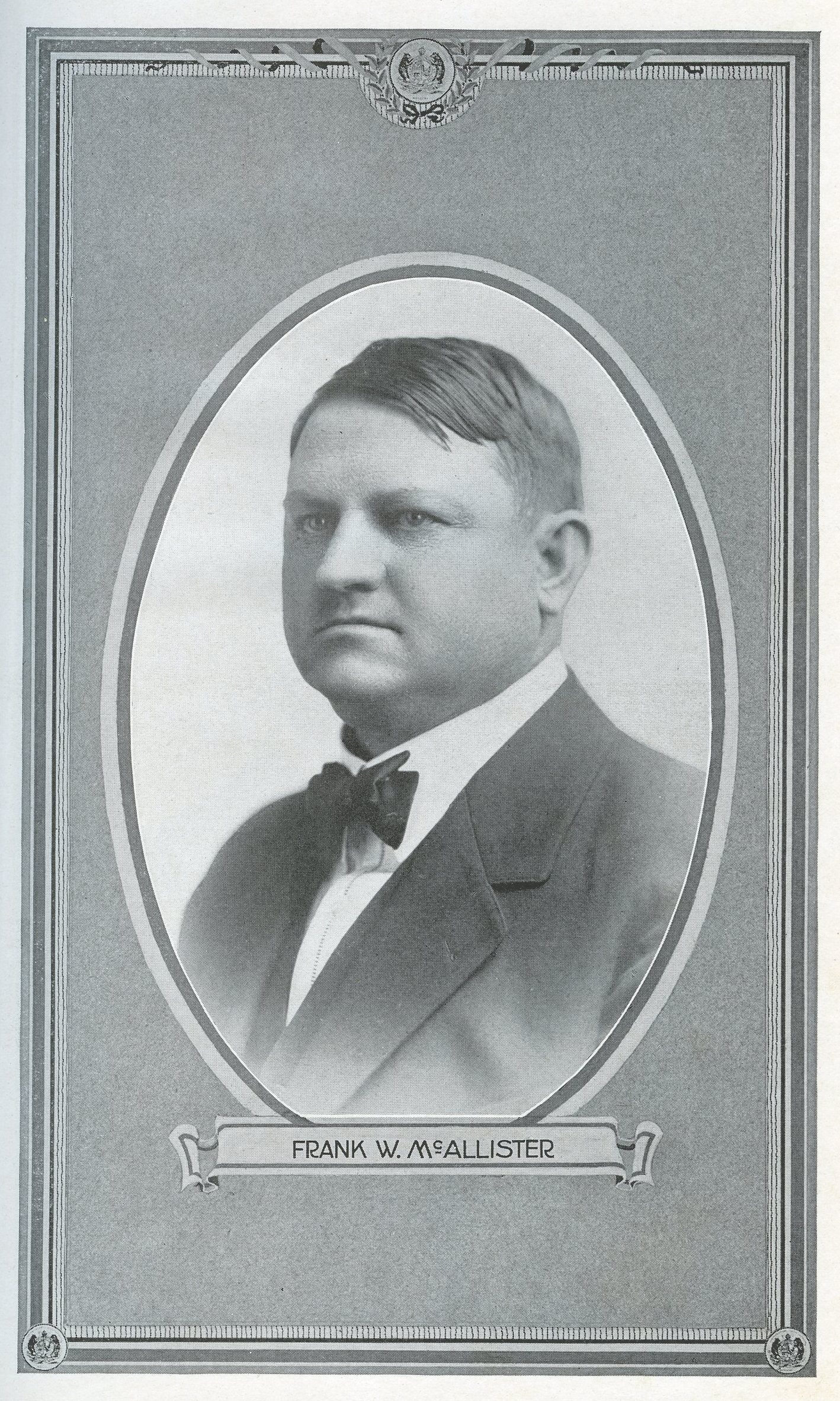

Nominee	Frank Winton McAllister	James H. Mason
Party	Democratic	Republican
Popular vote	394,440	374,076
Percentage	50.36%	47.76%
Attorney General before election
John T. Barker
Democratic
Elected Attorney General
Frank Winton McAllister
Democratic

The 1916 Missouri Attorney General election was held on November 7, 1916, in order to elect the attorney general of Missouri. Democratic nominee Frank Winton McAllister defeated Republican nominee James H. Mason and Socialist nominee Frank P. O'Hare.

== General election ==
On election day, November 7, 1916, Democratic nominee Frank Winton McAllister won the election by a margin of 20,364 votes against his foremost opponent Republican nominee James H. Mason, thereby retaining Democratic control over the office of attorney general. McAllister was sworn in as the 27th attorney general of Missouri on January 8, 1917.

=== Results ===
Missouri Attorney General election, 1916
Party	Candidate	Votes	%
Democratic	Frank Winton McAllister	394,440	50.36
Republican	James H. Mason	374,076	47.76
Socialist	Frank P. O'Hare	14,795	1.88
Total votes		783,311	100.00
Democratic hold			

== See also ==
- 1916 Missouri gubernatorial election
