= Albert P. Morehouse =

American politician (1835–1891)

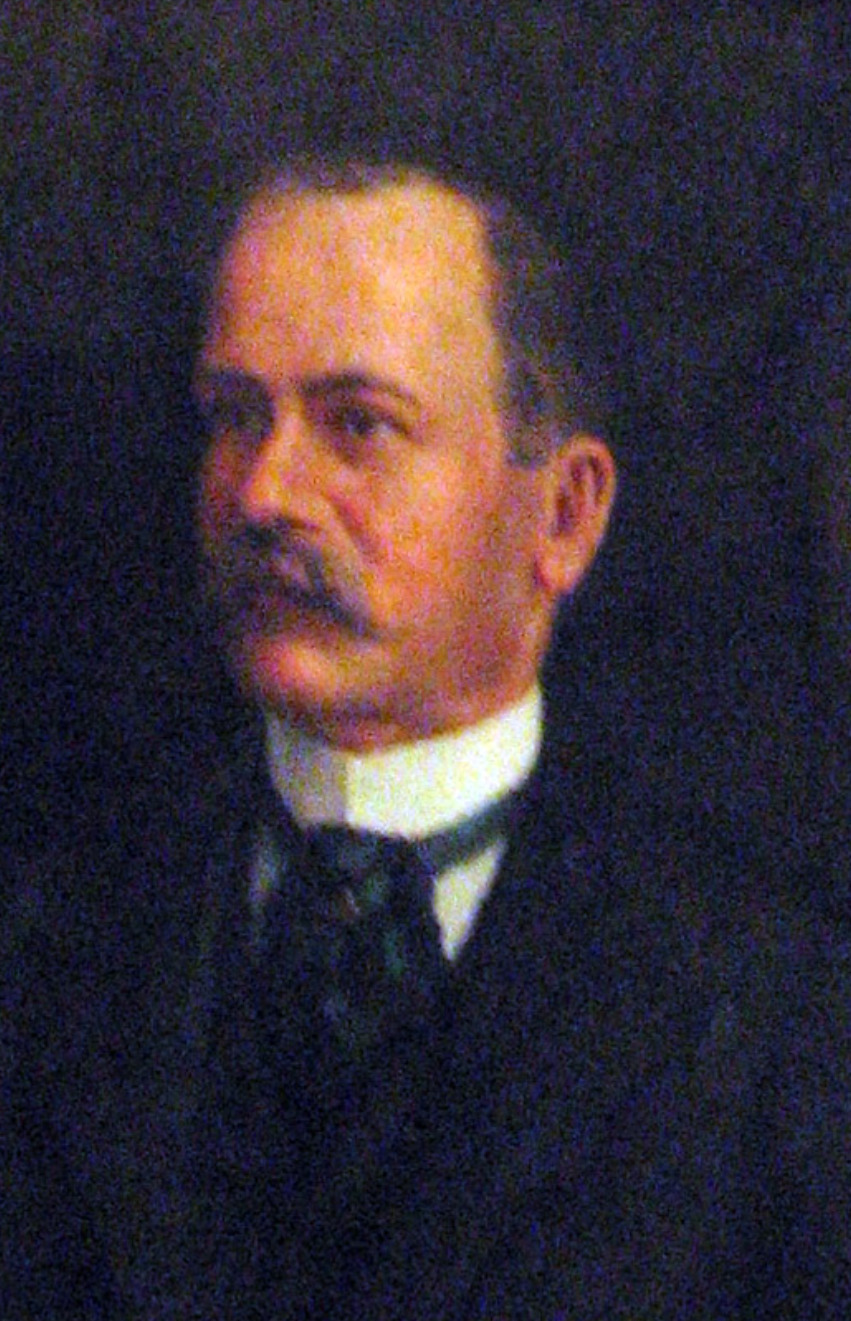

26th Governor of Missouri
- In office December 28, 1887 – January 14, 1889
- Lieutenant: Vacant
- Preceded by: John S. Marmaduke
- Succeeded by: David R. Francis

Lieutenant Governor of Missouri
- In office 1885–1887
- Governor: John S. Marmaduke
- Preceded by: Robert Alexander Campbell
- Succeeded by: Stephen Hugh Claycomb

Personal details
- Born: July 11, 1835 Delaware County, Ohio, U.S.
- Died: September 23, 1891 (aged 56) Maryville, Missouri, U.S.
- Party: Democratic
- Profession: lawyer

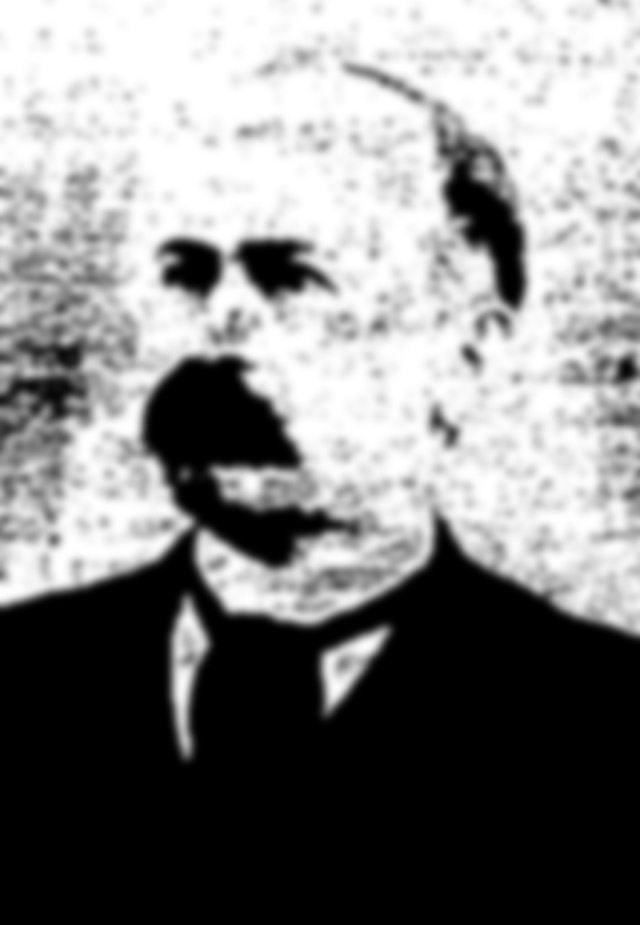

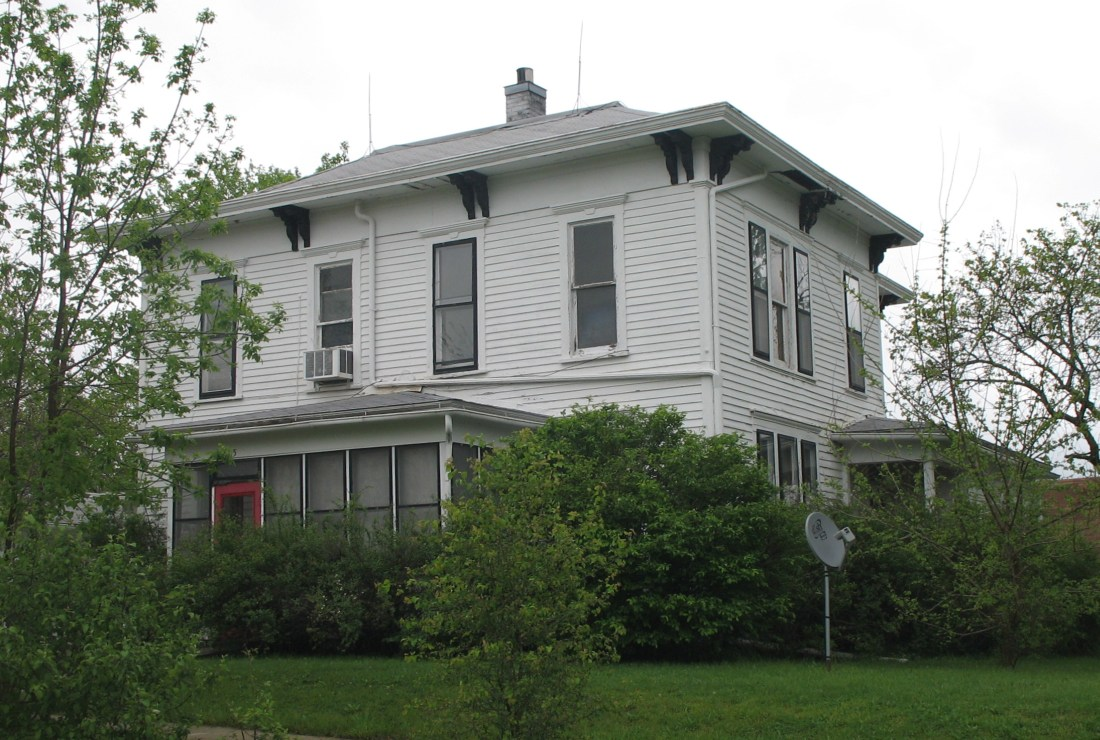
Maryville Governor Mansion where both Albert Morehouse and Forrest C. Donnell lived on North Vine in Maryville

Albert Pickett Morehouse (July 11, 1835 – September 23, 1891) was the 26th governor of Missouri from 1887 to 1889.

== Biography ==
Morehouse was born in Delaware County, Ohio and moved to Maryville, Missouri, in 1856. He was admitted to the bar and began practice in Montgomery County, Iowa.

At the beginning of the American Civil War, he moved to Graham, Missouri, where he taught school. He joined with the Missouri State Militia in November 1861 consisting of residents of Nodaway County, Missouri. While camped in Lafayette County, Missouri, he met his future wife Mattie McFadden.

After the war he formed a law practice with Amos Graham. In 1872 he founded the Nodaway Democrat which would become the Maryville Daily Forum.

He was elected to the Missouri House of Representatives in 1876 defeating H.M. Jackson by 197 votes. He was to actively pursue legislation to establish a Normal school in Maryville that eventually would result in Northwest Missouri State University locating in the town.

He was elected to the state house again in 1882 and was elected Missouri Lieutenant Governor in 1884.

As Lieutenant Governor, Morehouse assumed office on December 28, 1887, upon the death of John S. Marmaduke. He was in office for slightly more than a year when David R. Francis was elected to become governor.

Morehouse returned to Maryville where he had a real estate business with Nat Sission.

Morehouse died on September 23, 1891. After rupturing a blood vessel in his brain from an accident while herding cattle, Morehouse became delirious and didn't know what he was doing. He committed suicide by cutting his own throat with a pocket knife two days after the accident.

He is interred in Oak Hill Cemetery in Maryville.

The City of Morehouse, Missouri, is named for him.

Party political offices
Preceded by Robert Alexander Campbell	Democratic nominee for Lieutenant Governor of Missouri; 1884	Succeeded by Stephen Hugh Claycomb
Political offices
Preceded by Robert Alexander Campbell	Lieutenant Governor of Missouri; 1885–1887	Succeeded by Stephen Hugh Claycomb
Preceded by John S. Marmaduke	Governor of Missouri; 1887–1889	Succeeded by David R. Francis
