= William Lincoln Garver =

American architect

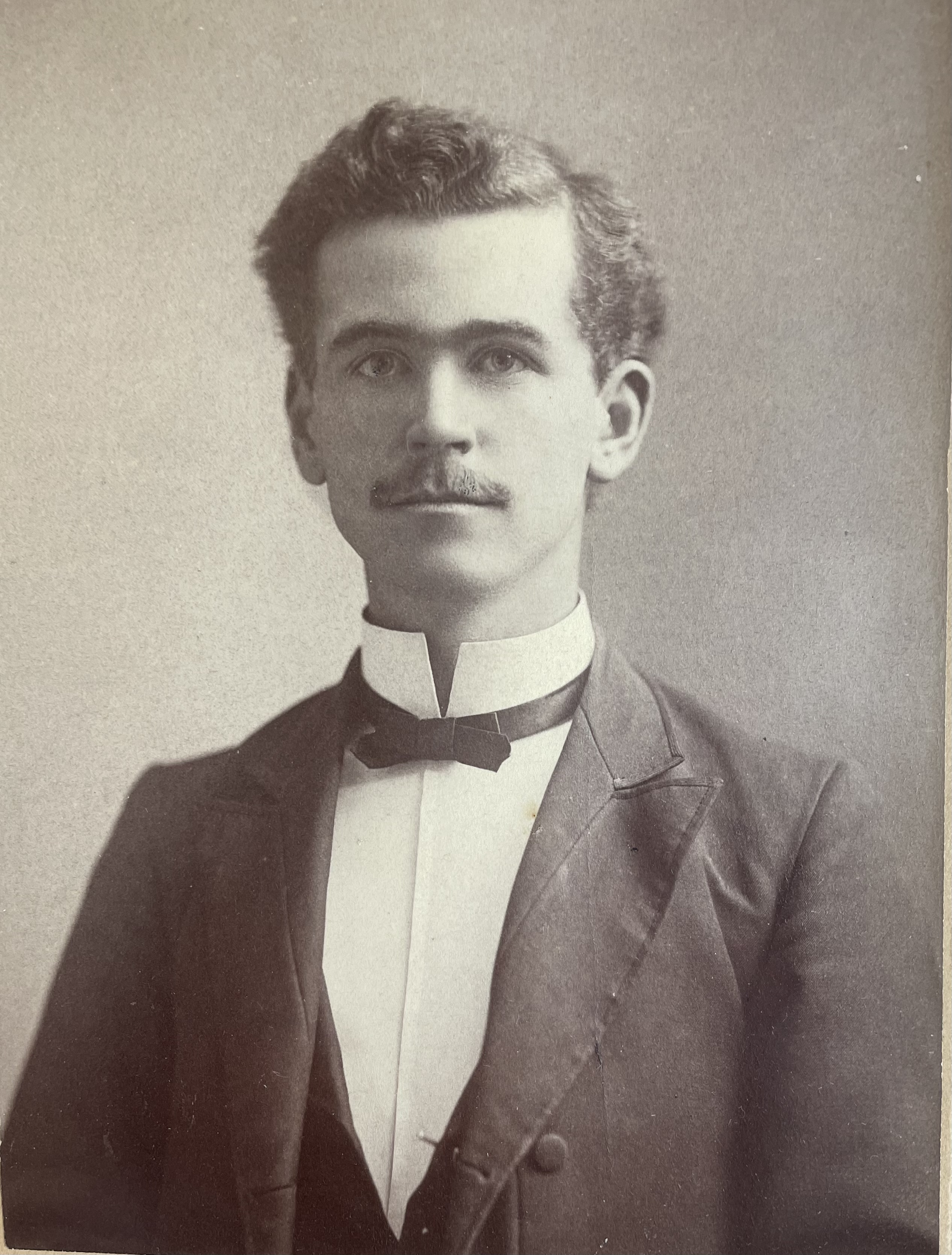
- William Lincoln Garver
- Born: June 5, 1867; Martinsburg, West Virginia
- Died: 1953; Chillicothe, Missouri
- Education: Westminster College, University of Missouri
- Occupations: Architect, author
- Years active: 1890s–1940s
- Notable work: Brother of the Third Degree; Francis Quadrangle
- Political party: Socialist Party of America, Socialist Party of Missouri
- Movement: Socialism, Theosophy

William Lincoln Garver (1867–1953) was an American architect, civil engineer, author, socialist leader, and political candidate from Missouri. He was primarily an architect by trade, and learned while working under his uncle, architect Morris Frederick Bell. Garver is probably best known for his work of occult fiction, Brother of the Third Degree. He was also a prolific political activist, authoring numerous pamphlets and articles on socialism. He was an influential leader in the Socialist Party of Missouri and the Socialist Party of America’s candidate for Governor of Missouri in 1908. His papers are held by the State Historical Society of Missouri in Columbia, Missouri.

== Biography ==
=== Early life ===
William L. Garver was born in 1867 in Martinsburg, West Virginia, but his family soon moved to a small farm outside Salina, Kansas. At the time of their arrival in the 1870s Kansas was sparsely populated and mostly untilled prairie. Garver's childhood in this natural environment gave him a lifelong love of nature. In the late 1870s the family moved Fulton, Missouri, where Garver graduated high school. He later attended Westminster College, and the University of Missouri. In 1891, he became associated with the Blavatskian school of Theosophy. He spent several years in a utopian commune in Sinaloa, Mexico.

=== Socialist activism ===
Garver was a delegate to the 1912 national convention of the Socialist Party of America, held May 12–18 in Indianapolis. In that capacity was responsible for an amendment to the party constitution prohibiting from membership anyone advocating “sabotage” as a tool in the class struggle, replacing language which would have called for expulsion of any party member who "advocates crime against the person or other methods of violence" with a more general ban on those advocating "crime, sabotage, or other methods of violence." Later ratified by referendum of the membership of the entire party, this "Article II, Section 6" would serve as the convenient rationale for the removal of controversial labor radical William D. Haywood from the party's governing National Executive Committee and spurring a split of party members with dual membership in the Industrial Workers of the World.

=== Architecture ===
In Fulton, he met and came to work for architect Morris Frederick Bell. He was the assistant architect and superintendent of construction for David R. Francis Quadrangle and Jesse Hall on the University of Missouri campus. Garver designed schools, civil buildings, homes, and business buildings around Missouri, eventually moving to Chillicothe.

=== Written works ===
His longest and most popular work, Brother of the Third Degree, was first published in 1894, and later translated and published in several languages. His advocacy of socialism included articles such as "Free Socialism", "Socialism in Brief", and "Abolish Rent". He was an advocate of free public higher education.
