= John Baptiste O'Meara =

Irish-American politician and businessman (1850–1926)

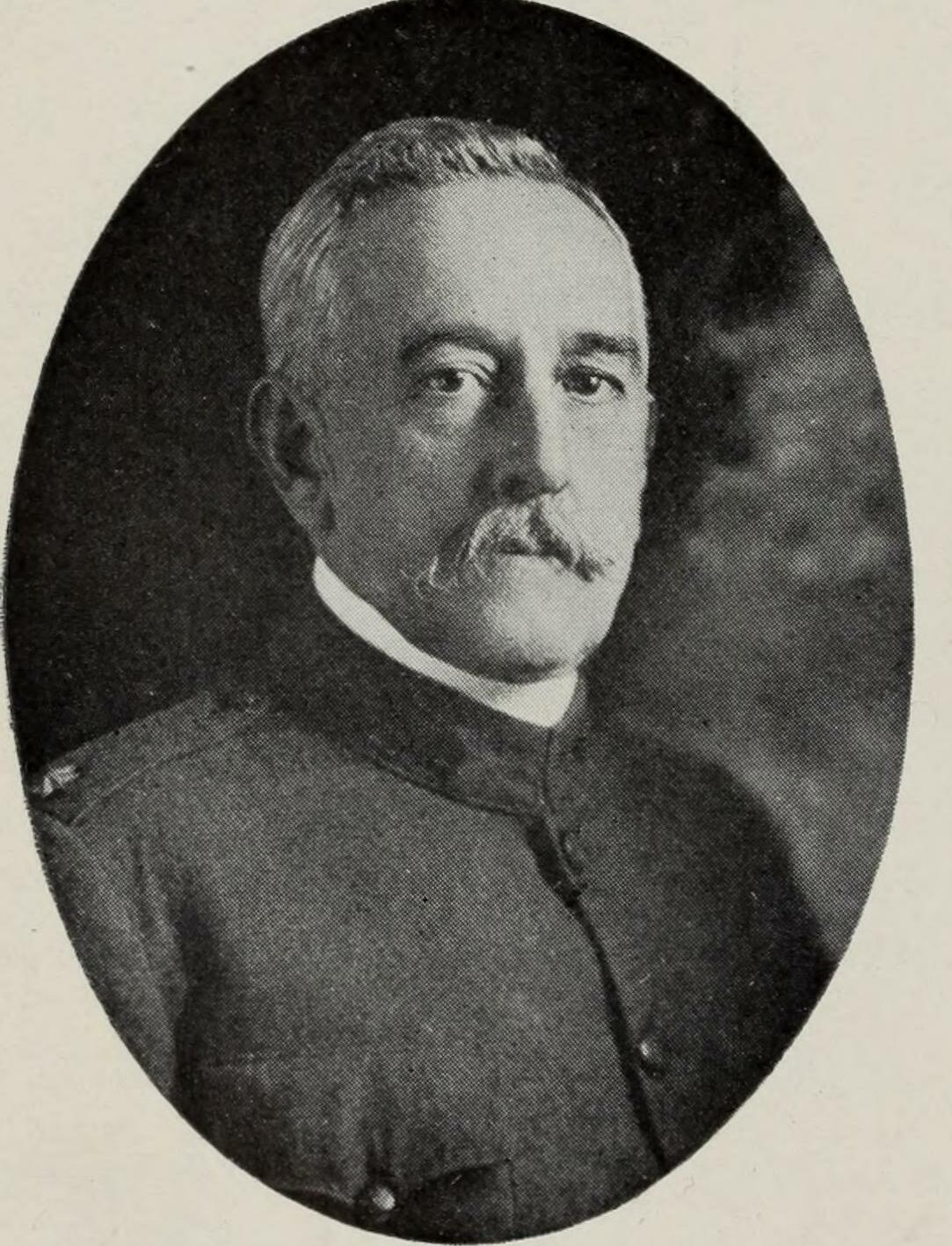
Image of O'Meara from the Journal of the American-Irish Historical Society, 1913.

John Baptiste O'Meara (born St. Louis, Missouri, June 4, 1850; died July 22, 1926) was an Irish-American politician, soldier, and businessman. Elected as a Democrat, he served as the Lieutenant Governor of Missouri from 1893 to 1897.

== Early life ==
O'Meara's parents, Patrick (1808–1876) and Mary (Dunn) O'Meara (d. 1895), came to Missouri from Ireland in 1835. O'Meara was educated in the St. Louis public schools and at St. Louis University, where he earned a B.A. He later got a degree in accounting at Jones Commercial College in St. Louis.

== Business career ==
O'Meara started his career as a bank teller and then worked for a stock and bond firm, P. F. Kelleher & Co. In 1880 he joined his late father's quarrying and construction firm. His firm became Hill-O'Meara Construction after the addition of Scottish immigrant John Hill. Their firm built many roads in the St. Louis area and a number of Missouri buildings, including the Second Presbyterian Church in St. Louis, the Missouri Supreme Court building in Jefferson City, and the Palace of Mines and Metallurgy for the Louisiana Purchase Exposition of 1904. Hill-O'Meara built many buildings for architect Theodore Link. The firm also operated at least three limestone quarries in the area.

== Other activities ==
O'Meara in 1870 joined the first company of Missouri Militia organized after the Civil War and rose through the ranks to serve as adjutant general of the Missouri National Guard. He was prominent in encouraging Congress to pass the National Defense Act of 1916, which among other provisions included the first federal grants for improving state guards.

Without holding previous political office, O'Meara was nominated for lieutenant governor as a Democrat in 1892, on a ticket with former Congressman William J. Stone. He served from 1893 to 1897.

O'Meara was a member of the original organizing committee for the Louisiana Purchase Exposition and helped organize financial contributions from fellow contractors.

O'Meara served as a vice-president of the American-Irish Historical Society.

== Family ==
O'Meara married Sallie Helm Ford in 1874; she was a granddaughter of Kentucky governor John L. Helm. He is buried in Calvary Cemetery in St. Louis.

Party political offices
Preceded by Stephen Hugh Claycomb	Democratic nominee for Lieutenant Governor of Missouri; 1892	Succeeded by August Bolte
