= August Bolte =

Missouri lieutenant governor (1854–1920)

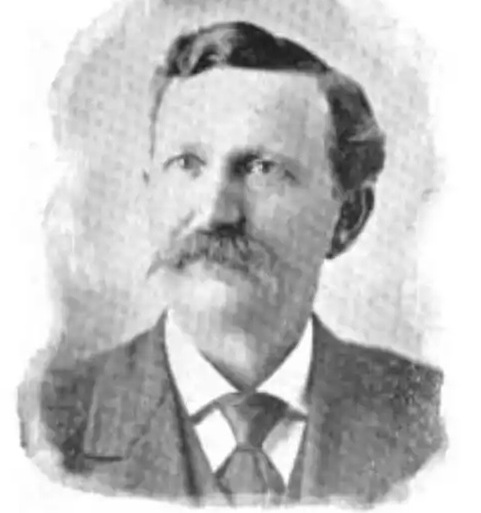

23rd Lieutenant Governor of Missouri
- In office January 11, 1897 – January 14, 1901
- Governor: Lawrence Vest Stephens
- Preceded by: John Baptiste O'Meara
- Succeeded by: John Adams Lee

Personal details
- Born: August Henry Bolte; September 3, 1854 Franklin County, Missouri, U.S.
- Died: June 24, 1920 (aged 65) St. Louis, Missouri, U.S.
- Resting place: Immanuel Lutheran Cemetery, Washington, Missouri
- Party: Democratic
- Spouse: Christina Arand (m. 1882)
- Education: University of Missouri
- Occupation: Lawyer, judge

August Henry Bolte (September 3, 1854 – June 24, 1920) (Note: The Missouri Secretary of State's official listing of lieutenant governors and the 1888 county history give his birth date as September 3, 1854. The Political Graveyard and his gravestone give September 23, 1854.) was an American lawyer and politician from Missouri. A member of the Democratic Party, he practiced law and served as a probate judge in Franklin County before his election as the 23rd lieutenant governor of Missouri, an office he held from 1897 to 1901 under Governor Lawrence Vest Stephens. In 1900 he was the Democratic nominee for the U.S. House of Representatives from Missouri's 10th congressional district, losing to Republican incumbent Richard Bartholdt.

== Early life ==
Bolte was born in Franklin County, Missouri, on September 3, 1854, the son of William Henry Bolte and Charlotte Wilhelmina (Haase) Bolte, German immigrants who farmed in the county. His father served as public administrator of Franklin County from 1862 to 1866. Bolte attended local common schools and a private high school in St. Louis, studied at Northwestern College in Watertown, Wisconsin, from 1871 to 1873, and graduated from the law department of the University of Missouri in 1875. He read law in the office of James Halligan at Union until Halligan's death in 1879.

Bolte was elected probate judge of Franklin County as a Democrat in 1880 and was re-elected in 1882 and 1886, holding the office until 1894. He then served as the Franklin County prosecuting attorney in 1895. He married Christina Arand in 1882 and was a member of the Evangelical Lutheran church.

== Political career ==
In 1896, Bolte was elected lieutenant governor of Missouri on the Democratic ticket with Lawrence Vest Stephens, and he took office on January 11, 1897. During his term he won the Democratic nomination for the U.S. House of Representatives from Missouri's 10th congressional district. He lost the 1900 general election to the Republican incumbent, Richard Bartholdt, who had served in the House since 1893.

== Later life and death ==
Bolte's term as lieutenant governor ended on January 14, 1901. In 1916 he was an alternate delegate to the 1916 Democratic National Convention. He died in St. Louis on June 24, 1920, and was buried at Immanuel Lutheran Cemetery in Washington, Missouri.

== Notes ==
Political offices
Preceded by John Baptiste O'Meara	Lieutenant Governor of Missouri; 1897–1901	Succeeded by John Adams Lee
