= Henry Clay Brockmeyer =

German-American poet, philosopher, and politician (1826–1906)

Henry Clay Brockmeyer (born Heinrich Conrad Brokmeyer, August 12, 1826 near Petershagen, Prussia – July 26, 1906 in St. Louis, Missouri) was a German-American poet, philosopher, and politician.

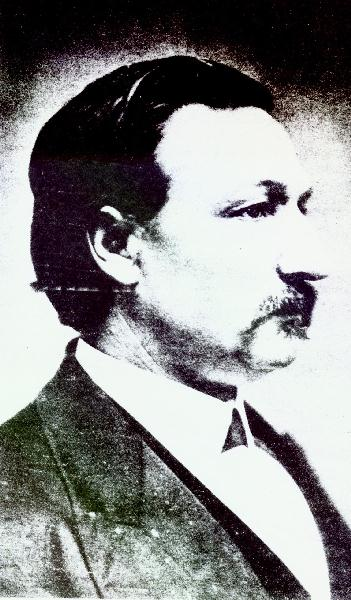
Henry Clay Brockmeyer

== Early life ==
Brockmeyer was born Heinrich Conrad Brokmeyer in Westphalia, near Petershagen, to a well-to-do family. On his mother's side he was a nephew of Friedrich Wilhelm von Bismarck, a Napoleonic-era general and diplomat in Württemberg. He emigrated to the United States at the age of sixteen, reputedly after his religious mother burned his copy of Goethe's poems. Brockmeyer arrived in St. Louis around age 20 and worked in a tannery and in other trades. He built a prosperous shoe-making business in Oktibbeha County, Mississippi and sold it when his health declined. He attended classes at Kentucky's Georgetown College for two years, but was threatened with expulsion over religious differences and withdrew, attending next Brown University, where he again attended classes for several years, contentiously, without completing a degree. He did manage to make the acquaintance of several literary notables, including Edgar Allan Poe and Sarah Helen Whitman.

== Philosophy ==
Returning to St. Louis, Brockmeyer left the city and lived in a cabin in rural Warren County for three years, continuing his studies while living off the land. In 1856 he started work on a translation of Hegel's Science of Logic. He returned to St. Louis to work in several iron foundries there, and met William Torrey Harris, then beginning a promising career in education. Harris was impressed with Brockmeyer's thought and knowledge of Hegel and invited him to teach Harris and a group of friends. These sessions marked the beginning of the St. Louis Hegelians. After a return to his cabin in Warren County, Brockmeyer became ill and with Harris' assistance returned to St. Louis to recover his health. There he completed his translation, which Harris started to publish in 1867 in his Journal of Speculative Philosophy.

== Politics ==
At the beginning of the Civil War Brockmeyer, a strong Union man, enlisted in the militia and helped organize a regiment, but, in the confusion of the time, was accused of disloyalty, arrested and imprisoned briefly. A short time later he was elected to the state house of representatives from Warren County; as a representative he led a committee investigating rebel efforts to control local Missouri governments and militia regiments. After his term of office he moved to St. Louis to practice law, having been admitted to the bar in Warren County.

In 1866 Brockmeyer was elected alderman in St. Louis, and in 1870 was elected to the state senate. In 1874 he was elected as a delegate to the constitutional convention of 1875. The following year he was elected lieutenant governor under the new constitution, and briefly served as acting governor during an illness of governor John Smith Phelps.

Brockmeyer was a strong booster of St. Louis and a believer in the "Great St. Louis Illusion"; he reportedly suffered greatly from the growing ascendancy of Chicago in the 1870s and 1880s. After retiring from public life in 1890, Brockmeyer may have spent time living in the Oklahoma Territory. He continued to work on his translations. Most of them were never published, but were read in manuscript by the St. Louis Hegelians.

== Legacy ==
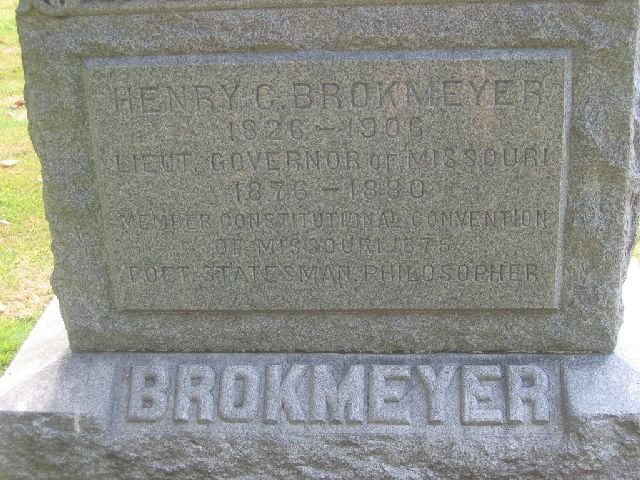
Grave at Bellefontaine Cemetery, St. Louis

Brockmeyer's personality and thought had a strong impact on all who met him. Writer Lilian Whiting wrote that his "strange personality dominated everyone", despite the fact that he "had no converse with social amenities." Brockmeyer openly heckled Bronson Alcott when he spoke in St. Louis. Denton Jacques Snider called Brockmeyer "a genuine original elemental poet" and said that "Without this poetic power he could not have barbed his weighty philosophy with flashes of lightning which would pierce and illumine for a moment at least the dullest and darkest brainpan." Harris acknowledged Brockmeyer's teaching and translations in his 1890 work "Hegel's Logic: A Critical Exposition". Another historian of this group called Brockmeyer "the inspirer, the Socrates of this movement, as Dr. Harris was the propagator, its Plato."

== Family ==
Brockmeyer married Elizabeth Robertson in 1861; she died in 1864 leaving him with three small children. He remarried in 1867, to Julia Kienlen (1845-1924), the daughter of German immigrant Christian Frederich Kienlen and Marie Louise Moreau, a St. Louis native of French-colonial descent. He had two children with Julia, Eugene Brokmeyer (b. 1870) and Julia Louise Walsh (1875-1940).

== Works ==
- A Foggy Night in Newport (play) - 1860
- Speech of Hon. H.C. Brockmeyer, delivered in the Senate of Missouri, February 8, 1872, upon the bill to repeal the usury law, and remove all restrictions upon the rate of interest to be charged for the use of money - 1872
- New constitution: reasons why a constitutional convention should be called: defects of the present organic law of Missouri: speech of Hon. H.C. Brockmeyer at the Temple, Oct. 24, 1874
- The Errand Boy: A Comedy in Five Acts (play) - 1904
- A Mechanic's Diary (semi-autobiographical novel) - 1910.

Party political offices
Preceded by Norman Jay Coleman	Democratic nominee for Lieutenant Governor of Missouri; 1876	Succeeded by Robert Alexander Campbell
Political offices
Preceded by Norman Jay Coleman	Lieutenant Governor of Missouri; 1877–1881	Succeeded by Robert Alexander Campbell
