= Claude C. Williams =

American Presbyterian minister and activist

- Born: 1895; Weakley County, Tennessee
- Died: June 29, 1979 (aged 84); Birmingham, Alabama
- Education: Bethel College, Vanderbilt School of Religion
- Occupation: Presbyterian minister
- Years active: 1927–1979
- Known for: Civil rights work, labor advocacy
- Spouse: Joyce King Williams

Claude Clossey Williams (1895–1979) was a Presbyterian minister active for more than 50 years in civil rights, race relations, and labor advocacy. He worked with the Southern Tenant Farmers Union, founded the People's Institute for Applied Religion, and served as the national vice president of the American Federation of Teachers. He was also the director of Commonwealth College in Mena, Arkansas, from 1937–1939.

As a young fundamentalist preacher in the rural South, Williams' initial motivation was the spiritual salvation of his parishioners, or in his words, to “save their never-dying, ever-precious souls from the devil’s hell eternal.” This motivation later evolved into a quest for social justice for the poor throughout society, leading to confrontations with white supremacists and lifelong charges of Communist activities. As Williams put it, “I’ve been run out of the best communities, fired from the best churches, and flogged by the best citizens of the South.”

== Early life ==
Williams was born in rural Weakley County, Tennessee. His parents, Jess and Minnie Bell Williams, were sharecroppers and members of the fundamentalist Cumberland Presbyterian Church. Williams enlisted in the army in 1916. He became a drill sergeant and trainer of draftees, re-enlisting in 1919. After leaving the army in 1921 he entered Bethel College, a small Cumberland Presbyterian seminary. While studying for the ministry he became an accomplished evangelical preacher. At Bethel he met Joyce King, a missionary student from Mississippi, whom he married in 1922. After graduating from Bethel in 1924, Williams gained his first pastorate at a Presbyterian church in Auburntown, Tennessee.

== Career Transition ==
In 1927, Williams read Harry Emerson Fosdick's Modern Use of the Bible. Fosdick interpreted the Bible as a militant social text, de-emphasizing a literalist interpretation and advocating societal progress and change. Williams credited this book as a turning point in his life. Williams was also influenced by seminars held by Dr. Alva W. Taylor at the Vanderbilt School of Religion. Taylor was a noted social activist and proponent of the Social Gospel, a movement that applied Christian ethics to social problems. At Vanderbilt the concept of Jesus as the “Son of Man” made a profound impression on Williams. Referring to Dr. Taylor, Williams said, “He cleared the debris of theological crap and let Him rise among us as a challenging human leader.”

In 1930, the Presbytery assigned Williams to a small church located in Paris, Arkansas. The church community consisted of poor miners, sharecroppers, and a few black families. Williams was determined to organize local miners, and through his efforts the congregation grew rapidly. However, church and community leaders were opposed to the influx of impoverished workers from surrounding areas, and were shocked by the prospect of mixed race services. As a result, the Presbytery removed Williams from the church.

In 1935, Williams was assigned to a church in Fort Smith, Arkansas. Here Williams and eight others were arrested for organizing a hunger march for unemployed workers. He was fined one hundred dollars, served ninety days in jail, and was tried for heresy by the Presbytery.

After his release from prison, Williams went to Little Rock, Arkansas where he trained sharecroppers and other workers as grassroots organizers. In 1936 Williams founded the New Era School for Social Action and Prophetic Religion. He also worked with the Southern Tenant Farmers Union to raise funds and promote schools. During this time Williams also served as vice-president of the American Federation of Teachers.

In June 1936, while traveling to Memphis to prepare the funeral for a black sharecropper who had been beaten to death, Williams was stopped by five sheriff's deputies and was himself severely beaten. Afterward he was forced to sign a statement that he hadn't been hurt, and was not allowed to continue to Memphis.

In 1937, Williams was appointed director of Commonwealth College in Mena, Arkansas. He remained in that position for two years, resigning in 1939 after accusations of Communist sympathies.

== The PIAR and Detroit ==
In 1940, Williams reorganized his New Era school as the People's Institute of Applied Religion (PIAR). The PIAR organized rural farmers and industrial workers, using Williams' skills as a minister to reach workers through their religious beliefs. The organization worked closely with the sharecropper movement and supported CIO activism in the South. The PIAR received support from Reinhold Niebuhr and Harry Ward, the Methodist Federation for Social Action, the Church League for Industrial Democracy, and the National Religion and Labor Foundation.

Williams attempted to blend religious piety with social activism. As he noted in later years:

“We were realistic, or at least we tried to be. We discovered that the fact that people believed in the Bible literally could be used to an advantage….Being so-called fundamentalists, accepting the Bible verbatim, had nothing whatsoever to do with a person’s understanding of the issues that related to bread and meat, raiment, shelter, jobs and civil liberties. Therefore, our approach was not an attempt to supplant their present mindset, but to supplement it with a more horizontal frame of reference. And we found that supplementing and supplanting turned out to be the same thing.”

The message of the PIAR was spread by a network of black and white preachers using visual aid charts and sermon outlines, presenting biblically-based aspects of social justice in simple terms.

In 1942, the Detroit Presbytery asked Williams to become an “industrial chaplain” ministering to the needs of southerners who had come north to work in the auto plants. Williams brought his PIAR organization along, and spent three years working with laborers, unions, and the black community. Accused by Gerald L. K. Smith and others of Communist activities, Williams was fired by the Presbytery in 1945.

== Later career ==
In 1946, Williams returned south to Birmingham, Alabama, where he established a Bible training program and continued his work with the PIAR. In 1953 Williams was again accused of being a Communist, this time by the House Un-American Activities Committee. A subsequent trial by the Detroit Presbytery did not address the issue of Communism but did find Williams guilty of heresy. He was defrocked as a minister and not reinstated until 1965.

== Final Years ==
During the 1950s and 1960s, Williams was active in the civil rights movement, working to register black voters, organize protests against police brutality, and help black farmers keep their land. Living with his wife in their trailer home near the rural community of Alabaster south of Birmingham, Williams’ financial support came from funds raised by the Claude Williams Committee. Williams' wife died in 1976. He continued work until his own death in 1979.
