= 1900 Danish local elections =

Regional elections were held in Denmark in December 1900. A total of 435 municipal council members were elected. In addition, 1,817 members of various parish (Danish, sogn) councils (Danish, sogneråd) were selected by the middle class, and 2,535 parish council members by the upper class.
