= Frank H. Farris =

American politician (1867–1926)

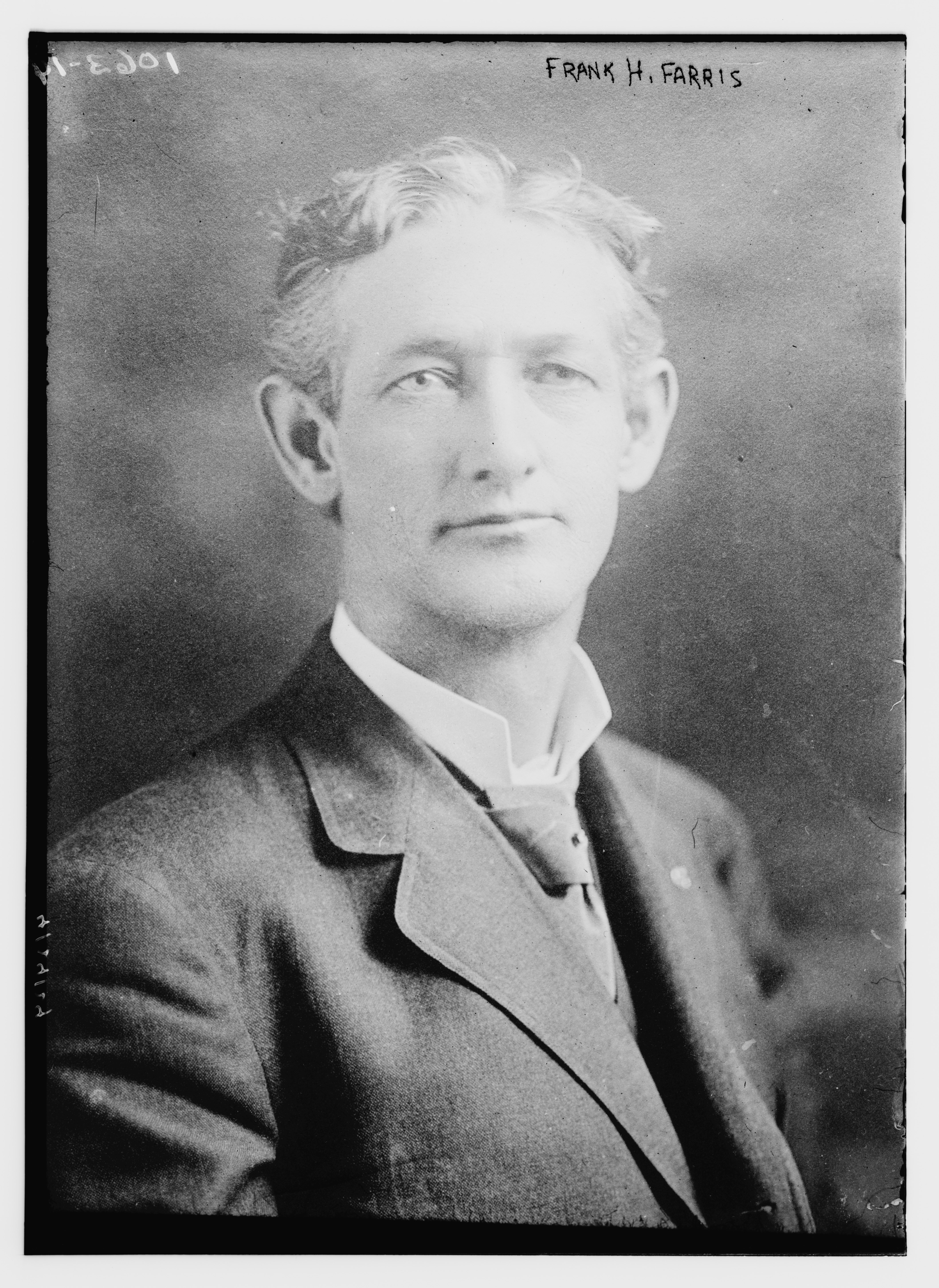

Personal details
- Born: August 8, 1867; Lebanon, Missouri
- Died: September 1, 1927 (aged 59–60); Rolla, Missouri

Frank H. Farris (August 8, 1867 – September 1, 1926) was a Missouri attorney who became a member of both the state's Senate and its House of Representatives.

Frank H. Farris, center rear, during a discussion of the Susan B. Anthony Amendment, with other legislators and a constituent. Drawing by Marguerite Martyn for the St. Louis Post-Dispatch, February 9, 1913

== Personal life ==
Farris was born on August 8, 1867, in Lebanon, Missouri. He was the son of J.W. or J.T. Farris. He was educated in Lebanon and Marionville, Missouri.

His marriage certificate to his first wife, Emma Miller, was issued in Greenfield, Missouri, on May 14, 1884, when he was under age. Emma died in April 1905 or 1906, leaving him with three children. He married again, to Cora Shanks of St. Louis, in Idaho Springs, Colorado, in August 1906. They divorced in 1922, the same year he married Bertha Dent, 22, his stenographer.

He died of cancer at the age of 59 on September 1, 1926, in Rolla.

The funeral was held late Sunday evening, September 5, 1926, on the lawn of his home in Rolla at his request. Officiating was the Reverend Calvin R. Dobson of St. Louis. Seven incumbent state senators attended.

He was a Mason and a member of the Knights of Pythias. He was survived by grown daughters Mrs. Arch Grubb of Rolla, Missouri; Mrs. R.L. Johnson of Allen, Oklahoma; Mrs. L.O. Williams of Palm Beach, Florida, and infant daughter Mary Susan Farris.

== Professional life ==
As a schoolboy, he was a page in the Missouri House of Representatives, of which his father was the speaker. Farris became a lawyer and he was elected to the State Senate in Crawford County, Missouri, in 1898 and reelected in 1902. He moved to Phelps County, Missouri, and he was elected to the Missouri House of Representatives in 1914, 1916, and 1918. He ran for the Democratic nomination for governor in 1920 and was elected to the State Senate again in 1922.

He was an attorney for the Frisco Railroad.

In 1903 Ferris was indicted on a bribery charge related to a bill that prohibited the sale of baking powder containing alum. However, he was acquitted after two trials. Farris was indicted in 1919 on a charge of "unlawfully conspiring and confederating" to get votes for a St. Louis police salary increase. A judge quashed the indictment.
