= John Adams Lee =

American grocer and politician

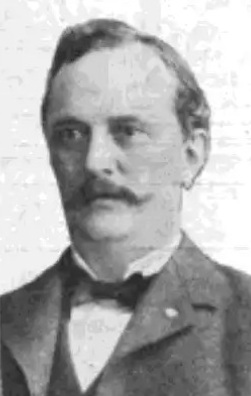

Lieutenant Governor of Missouri
- In office 1901 – April 25, 1903

Personal details
- Born: June 28, 1851 Flemingsburg, Kentucky
- Died: October 10, 1928 (aged 77)
- Party: Democratic

John Adams Lee (born Flemingsburg, Kentucky, June 28, 1851; died Chicago, Illinois, October 10, 1928) was an American grocer and politician. He served as the Democratic Lieutenant Governor of Missouri from 1901 to April 25, 1903, when he resigned over his part in the Baking Powder Scandal.

== Early life ==
John Adams Lee's father, James A. Lee, could trace his ancestry back to colonial Virginia. Born in Kentucky, John Adams Lee's family moved to St. Louis when he was six, returning to Kentucky in 1861 at the onset of the Civil War. After being educated in the public schools in Kentucky, Lee went to work in Louisville, Kentucky and ended up in the grocery business as a traveling merchant.

== Missouri political career ==
By 1881 Lee had returned to St. Louis. In 1891 he was involved with a trade journal called The Inter-State Grocer. In 1893 he was appointed Police Commissioner of St. Louis by Democratic Governor William J. Stone, serving until 1897.

In 1896, Lee ran unsuccessfully for lieutenant governor. In 1900, Lee was elected Lieutenant governor of Missouri on the Democratic ticket with Alexander Monroe Dockery. He resigned his office on April 25, 1903, as a result of the Baking Powder Scandal.

== Baking Powder Scandal ==
The introduction of an alum-based baking powder by the Calumet Baking Powder Company in 1888 lead the Royal Baking Powder Company, the chief seller of cream of tartar-based baking powder, to conduct a campaign of marketing, disinformation, and legal actions against alum baking powder - the "baking powder wars". In 1899 Royal persuaded Missouri to pass a law banning the sale of alum baking powder on safety grounds. However, the law became a political issue, with grocers and others pressuring the legislature to repeal the law.

Adams, who served as president of the Senate as part of his position as lieutenant governor, solicited and received bribes from Royal to keep the alum ban in place, some of which he passed on to Frank H. Farris and other senators. Adams used his vote as presiding officer to break a tie and defeat the repeal effort. After the scheme became public, Adams briefly fled the state before returning and testifying to a grand jury, which lead to unsuccessful efforts to prosecute Farris and the officers of the Royal Baking Powder Company.

== Family ==
Lee married Virginia Gathwright in 1880 in Louisville, Kentucky. They had four children - Virginia Dorcas (born 1881), Minnie Deming (b. 1884), James Owen (b. 1886), and Eva Gathwright (b. 1889).

Virginia Dorcas Lee married millionaire newspaper publisher and Boy Scouts of America founder William D. Boyce in 1910; after they had a daughter named Virginia in 1911, they were divorced in 1912 and Virginia Dorcas, her daughter and her parents all moved to Santa Barbara, California.

Lee later moved to Chicago and self-published a book How to Buy and Sell Canned Foods (1926). He died in 1928 and is buried in the Acacia Park Cemetery in Norwood Park Township to the northwest of Chicago.

Party political offices
Preceded by August Bolte	Democratic nominee for Lieutenant Governor of Missouri; 1900	Succeeded by Thomas L. Rubey
