= Robert Alexander Campbell =

American politician

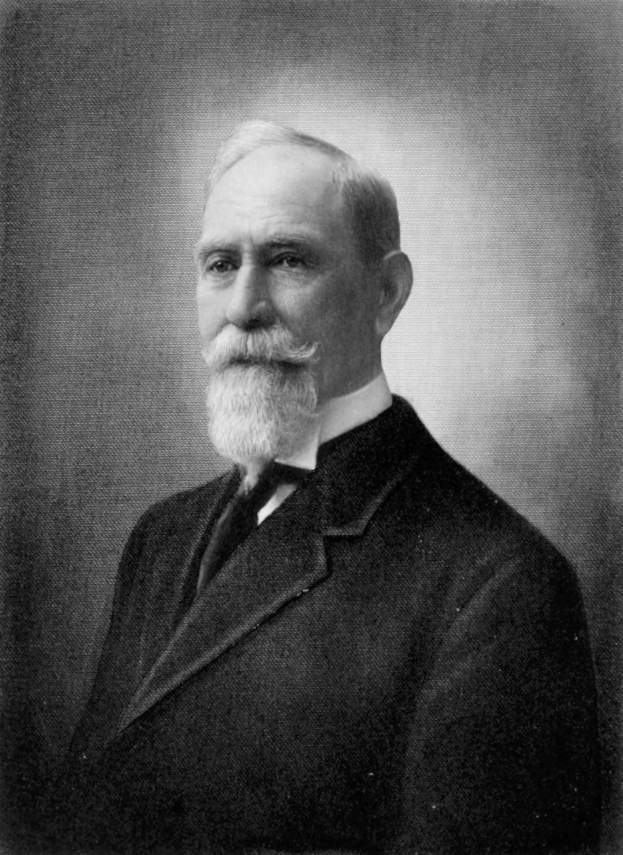

19th Lieutenant Governor of Missouri
- In office 1881–1885
- Governor: Thomas Theodore Crittenden
- Preceded by: Henry Clay Brockmeyer
- Succeeded by: Albert P. Morehouse

Personal details
- Born: September 2, 1832; Bowling Green, Missouri, US
- Died: April 2, 1926 (aged 93); St. Louis, Missouri, US
- Political party: Democratic
- Profession: Politician, lawyer, businessman

Robert Alexander Campbell (September 2, 1832 – April 2, 1926) was a nineteenth-century politician, lawyer and businessman from Missouri. He was Lieutenant Governor of Missouri from 1881 to 1885.

== Biography ==
Campbell was born in Bowling Green, Missouri on September 2, 1832. He studied three years of college at Illinois College in Jacksonville, Illinois, and left in his senior year in 1852, though the college awarded him a degree much later in his life in 1908. After teaching school for one term he went to California with his father and worked in ranching and mining for two years. He returned to Missouri in 1854, and eventually studied law and was admitted to the bar in 1860. He fought in the Civil War and then returned to law practice until 1869, when he moved into railroads through 1877. He served in the Missouri general assembly starting in 1869, and was eventually named speaker pro tem. He was elected lieutenant governor in 1880. In 1885 he was elected comptroller of St. Louis, serving until 1889, when he was then appointed to be a criminal court judge in St. Louis. After that position, he retired.

He died in St. Louis, Missouri on April 2, 1926.

Party political offices
Preceded by Henry Clay Brockmeyer	Democratic nominee for Lieutenant Governor of Missouri; 1880	Succeeded by Albert P. Morehouse
Political offices
Preceded by Henry Clay Brockmeyer	Lieutenant Governor of Missouri; 1881–1885	Succeeded by Albert P. Morehouse
