= 1900 Wisconsin lieutenant gubernatorial election =

- November 6, 1900
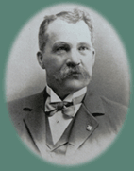

Nominee	Jesse Stone	Thomas H. Patterson
Party	Republican	Democratic
Popular vote	263,993	160,044
Percentage	59.83%	36.27%
Lieutenant Governor before election
Jesse Stone
Republican
Elected Lieutenant Governor
Jesse Stone
Republican

The 1900 Wisconsin lieutenant gubernatorial election was held on November 6, 1900, in order to elect the lieutenant governor of Wisconsin. Incumbent Republican lieutenant governor Jesse Stone defeated Democratic nominee Thomas H. Patterson, Prohibition nominee Thorvild Thorvilson and Social Democratic nominee George Dicke.

== General election ==
On election day, November 6, 1900, incumbent Republican lieutenant governor Jesse Stone won re-election by a margin of 103,949 votes against his foremost opponent Democratic nominee Thomas H. Patterson, thereby retaining Republican control over the office of lieutenant governor. Stone was sworn in for his second term on January 7, 1901.

=== Results ===
Wisconsin lieutenant gubernatorial election, 1900
Party	Candidate	Votes	%
Republican	Jesse Stone (incumbent)	263,993	59.83
Democratic	Thomas H. Patterson	160,044	36.27
Prohibition	Thorvild Thorvilson	9,892	2.24
Social Democratic	George Dicke	6,679	1.51
	Scattering	597	0.15
Total votes		441,205	100.00
Republican hold			
