= Stephen Hugh Claycomb =

American politician

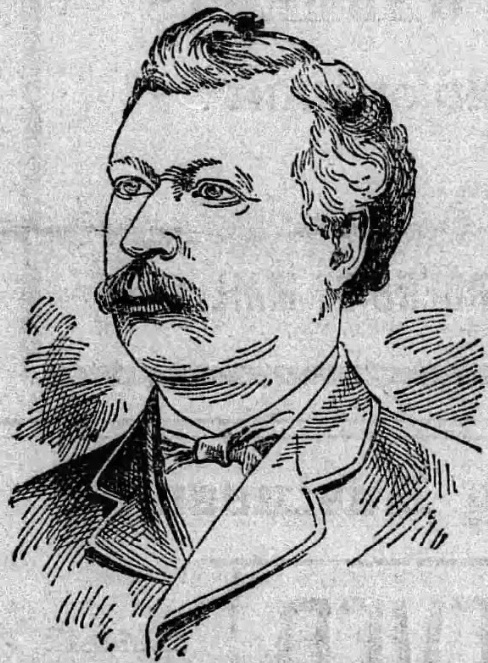

21st Lieutenant Governor of Missouri
- In office 1889–1893
- Governor: David R. Francis
- Preceded by: Albert P. Morehouse
- Succeeded by: John Baptiste O'Meara

Personal details
- Born: August 11, 1847 Waverly, Missouri, U.S.
- Died: June 6, 1930 (aged 82) Joplin, Missouri, U.S.
- Party: Democratic
- Profession: Attorney, Politician

Stephen Hugh Claycomb (August 11, 1847 – June 6, 1930) was a nineteenth-century politician and attorney from Missouri. He was Lieutenant Governor of Missouri from 1889 to 1893.

== Biography ==
Claycomb was born in Waverly, Missouri on August 11, 1847. He attended college in Illinois and Michigan. He then graduated from the University of Virginia School of Law (then the "law department") in 1869, and was admitted to the Saline County, Missouri bar. In 1873 he was admitted to the Jasper County, Missouri bar and practiced in Joplin.

Claycomb was elected to the state legislature from Jasper County, becoming a state representative in 1884, and a state senator in 1886. In 1888 he was elected Lieutenant Governor of Missouri, serving under Governor David R. Francis from January 1889 to January 1893. Claycomb was among those considered in 1892 by the Missouri Democratic Party to run for governor, but William J. Stone, who was from the same area of the state, won the nomination instead.

In 1910, Claycomb was ejected from his Baptist church in Joplin for advocating against Prohibition, arguing that the Bible supports drinking alcohol and that drinking coffee was more harmful than liquor.

Claycomb died in Joplin, Missouri on June 6, 1930.

He married Sallie Elizabeth Hayden in 1874 in Nevada, Missouri.

Party political offices
Preceded by Albert P. Morehouse	Democratic nominee for Lieutenant Governor of Missouri; 1888	Succeeded by John Baptiste O'Meara
Political offices
Preceded by Albert P. Morehouse	Lieutenant Governor of Missouri; 1889–1893	Succeeded by John Baptiste O'Meara
