= 1900 Connecticut lieutenant gubernatorial election =

- November 6, 1900
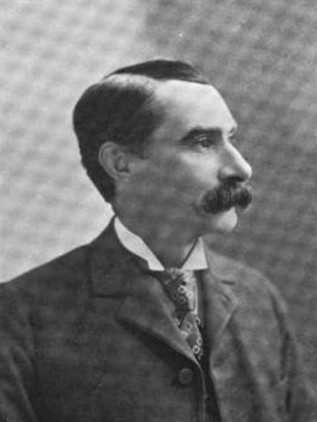

Nominee	Edwin O. Keeler	Cyrus G. Beckwith
Party	Republican	Democratic
Popular vote	100,302	77,223
Percentage	56.50%	43.50%
Lieutenant Governor before election
Lyman A. Mills
Republican
Elected Lieutenant Governor
Edwin O. Keeler
Republican

The 1900 Connecticut lieutenant gubernatorial election was held on November 6, 1900, to elect the lieutenant governor of Connecticut. Republican nominee and incumbent member of the Connecticut Senate Edwin O. Keeler won the election against Democratic nominee and former member of the Connecticut Senate Cyrus G. Beckwith.

== General election ==
On election day, November 6, 1900, Republican nominee Edwin O. Keeler won the election with 56.50% of the vote, thereby retaining Republican control over the office of lieutenant governor. Keeler was sworn in as the 69th lieutenant governor of Connecticut on January 9, 1901.

=== Results ===
Connecticut lieutenant gubernatorial election, 1900
Party	Candidate	Votes	%
Republican	Edwin O. Keeler	100,302	56.50
Democratic	Cyrus G. Beckwith	77,223	43.50
Total votes		177,525	100.00
Republican hold			
