= List of lieutenant governors of Missouri =

Lieutenant Governor of Missouri
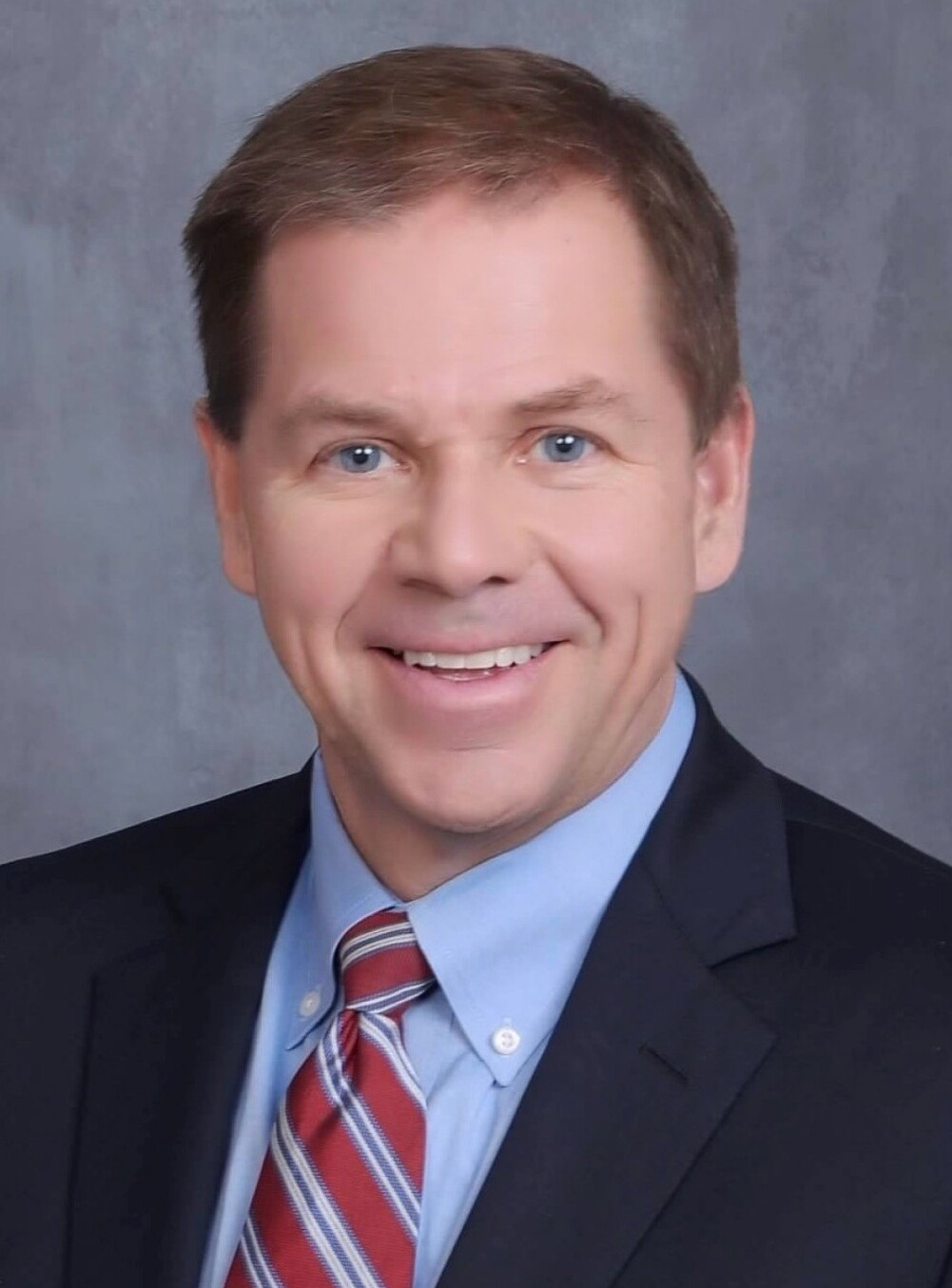
- Incumbent; David Wasinger since January 13, 2025
- Appointer: Popular election / Governor of Missouri
- Term length: Four years, no term limits
- Inaugural holder: William Henry Ashley
- Formation: 1820
- Succession: First
- Salary: $86,484 (2017)

Number of lieutenant governors of Missouri by party affiliation
Party	Governors
Democratic	32
Republican	13
Democratic-Republican	2
Liberal Republican	2

The lieutenant governor of Missouri is the first person in the order of succession of the U.S. state of Missouri's executive branch, thus serving as governor in the event of the death, resignation, removal, impeachment, absence from the state, or incapacity due to illness of the governor of Missouri. The lieutenant governor also serves, ex officio, as president of the Missouri Senate. The lieutenant governor is elected separately from the governor, and therefore may be of a different party than the governor.

The current lieutenant governor is David Wasinger, since January 13, 2025.

== List ==
Democratic-Republican (2) Democratic (32) Republican (13) Liberal Republican (2)

#	Lieutenant Governor	Took office	Left office	Party	Governor	Terms^{[A]}
1	William Henry Ashley	Sep 18, 1820	Nov 15, 1824	Democratic-Republican	Alexander McNair	1
2	Benjamin Harrison Reeves	Nov 15, 1824	July 1825	Democratic-Republican	Frederick Bates	1/2^{[B]}
Vacant		July 1825	Nov 17, 1828		Frederick Bates	1/2^{[C]}
Vacant		July 1825	Nov 17, 1828		Abraham J. Williams	1/2^{[C]}
Vacant		July 1825	Nov 17, 1828		John Miller	1/2^{[C]}
3	Daniel Dunklin	Nov 17, 1828	Nov 19, 1832	Democratic	John Miller	1
4	Lilburn Boggs	Nov 19, 1832	Sep 30, 1836	Democratic	Daniel Dunklin	1/2
Vacant		Sep 30, 1836	Nov 21, 1836		Lilburn Boggs	1/2^{[D]}
5	Franklin Cannon	Nov 21, 1836	Nov 16, 1840	Democratic	Lilburn Boggs	1
6	Meredith Miles Marmaduke	Nov 16, 1840	Feb 9, 1844	Democratic	Thomas Reynolds	1/2
Vacant		Feb 9, 1844	Nov 20, 1844		Meredith Miles Marmaduke	1/2^{[D]}
7	James Young	Nov 20, 1844	Nov 20, 1848	Democratic	John C. Edwards	1
8	Thomas Lawson Price	Nov 20, 1848	Jan 3, 1853	Democratic	Austin Augustus King	1
9	Wilson Brown	Jan 3, 1853	Aug 27, 1855	Democratic	Sterling Price	1/2^{[E]}
Vacant		Aug 27, 1855	Jan 5, 1857		Sterling Price	1/2^{[F]}
10	Hancock Lee Jackson	Jan 5, 1857	Feb 27, 1857	Democratic	Trusten Polk	1/12
Vacant		Feb 27, 1857	Oct 22, 1857		Hancock Lee Jackson	1/6^{[G]}
10	Hancock Lee Jackson	Oct 22, 1857	Jan 3, 1861	Democratic	Robert Marcellus Stewart	3/4
11	Thomas Caute Reynolds	Jan 3, 1861	Jul 23, 1861	Democratic	Claiborne Fox Jackson	1/6^{[H]}
12	Willard Preble Hall	Jul 31, 1861	Jan 31, 1864	Republican	Hamilton Rowan Gamble	2/3^{[I]}
Vacant		Jan 31, 1864	Jan 2, 1865		Willard Preble Hall	1/4^{[D]}
13	George Smith	Jan 2, 1865	Jan 12, 1869	Republican	Thomas Clement Fletcher	1
14	Edwin Obed Stanard	Jan 12, 1869	Jan 4, 1871	Republican	Joseph W. McClurg	1
15	Joseph J. Gravely	Jan 4, 1871	Apr 28, 1872	Liberal Republican	B. Gratz Brown	1/2^{[E]}
Vacant		Apr 28, 1872	Jan 3, 1873		B. Gratz Brown	1/2^{[F]}
16	Charles Phillip Johnson	Jan 3, 1873	Jan 12, 1875	Liberal Republican	Silas Woodson	1
17	Norman Jay Colman	Jan 12, 1875	Jan 8, 1877	Democratic	Charles Henry Hardin	1
18	Henry Clay Brockmeyer	Jan 8, 1877	Jan 10, 1881	Democratic	John Smith Phelps	1
19	Robert Alexander Campbell	Jan 10, 1881	Jan 12, 1885	Democratic	Thomas Theodore Crittenden	1
20	Albert P. Morehouse	Jan 12, 1885	Dec 28, 1887	Democratic	John S. Marmaduke	1/2
Vacant		Dec 28, 1887	Jan 14, 1889		Albert P. Morehouse	1/2^{[D]}
21	Stephen Hugh Claycomb	Jan 14, 1889	Jan 9, 1893	Democratic	David R. Francis	1
22	John Baptiste O'Meara	Jan 9, 1893	Jan 11, 1897	Democratic	William Joel Stone	1
23	August Bolte	Jan 11, 1897	Jan 14, 1901	Democratic	Lawrence Vest Stephens	1
24	John Adams Lee	Jan 14, 1901	Apr 25, 1903	Democratic	Alexander Monroe Dockery	1/2^{[B]}
25	Thomas Lewis Rubey	Apr 25, 1903	Jan 9, 1905	Democratic	Alexander Monroe Dockery	1/2^{[J]}
26	John C. McKinley	Jan 9, 1905	Jan 11, 1909	Republican	Joseph W. Folk	1
27	Jacob Friedrich Gmelich	Jan 11, 1909	Jan 13, 1913	Republican	Herbert S. Hadley	1
28	William Rock Painter	Jan 13, 1913	Jan 8, 1917	Democratic	Elliot Woolfolk Major	1
29	Wallace Crossley	Jan 8, 1917	Jan 10, 1921	Democratic	Frederick D. Gardner	1
30	Hiram Lloyd	Jan 10, 1921	Jan 12, 1925	Republican	Arthur M. Hyde	1
31	Philip Allen Bennett	Jan 12, 1925	Jan 14, 1929	Republican	Samuel Aaron Baker	1
32	Edward Henry Winter	Jan 14, 1929	Jan 9, 1933	Republican	Henry S. Caulfield	1
33	Frank Gaines Harris	Jan 9, 1933	Dec 30, 1944	Democratic	Guy Brasfield Park	2 1/2^{[E]}
33	Frank Gaines Harris	Jan 9, 1933	Dec 30, 1944	Democratic	Lloyd C. Stark	2 1/2^{[E]}
33	Frank Gaines Harris	Jan 9, 1933	Dec 30, 1944	Democratic	Forrest C. Donnell	2 1/2^{[E]}
Vacant		Dec 30, 1944	Jan 8, 1945		Forrest C. Donnell	1/2^{[F]}
34	Walter Naylor Davis	Jan 8, 1945	Jan 10, 1949	Democratic	Phil M. Donnelly	1
35	James T. Blair Jr.	Jan 10, 1949	Jan 14, 1957	Democratic	Forrest Smith	2
35	James T. Blair Jr.	Jan 10, 1949	Jan 14, 1957	Democratic	Phil M. Donnelly	2
36	Edward V. Long	Jan 14, 1957	Sep 23, 1960	Democratic	James T. Blair Jr.	1/2^{[K]}
Vacant		Sep 23, 1960	Jan 9, 1961		James T. Blair Jr.	1/2^{[C]}
37	Hilary A. Bush	Jan 9, 1961	Jan 11, 1965	Democratic	John M. Dalton	1
38	Thomas Eagleton	Jan 11, 1965	Dec 27, 1968	Democratic	Warren E. Hearnes	1
Vacant		Dec 27, 1968	Jan 13, 1969		Warren E. Hearnes	1/48 ^{[c]}
39	William S. Morris	Jan 13, 1969	Jan 8, 1973	Democratic	Warren E. Hearnes	1
40	William C. Phelps	Jan 8, 1973	Jan 12, 1981	Republican	Kit Bond	2
40	William C. Phelps	Jan 8, 1973	Jan 12, 1981	Republican	Joseph P. Teasdale	2
41	Kenneth Rothman	Jan 12, 1981	Jan 14, 1985	Democratic	Kit Bond	1
42	Harriett Woods	Jan 14, 1985	Jan 9, 1989	Democratic	John Ashcroft	1
43	Mel Carnahan	Jan 9, 1989	Jan 11, 1993	Democratic	John Ashcroft	1
44	Roger B. Wilson	Jan 11, 1993	Oct 16, 2000	Democratic	Mel Carnahan	1/3
Vacant		Oct 16, 2000	Nov 15, 2000		Roger B. Wilson	1/3^{[D]}
45	Joe Maxwell	Nov 15, 2000	Jan 10, 2005	Democratic	Roger B. Wilson	1 1/3^{[L]}
45	Joe Maxwell	Nov 15, 2000	Jan 10, 2005	Democratic	Bob Holden	1 1/3^{[L]}
46	Peter Kinder	Jan 10, 2005	Jan 9, 2017	Republican	Matt Blunt	3
46	Peter Kinder	Jan 10, 2005	Jan 9, 2017	Republican	Jay Nixon	3
47	Mike Parson	Jan 9, 2017	Jun 1, 2018	Republican	Eric Greitens	1/3
48	Mike Kehoe	Jun 18, 2018	Jan 13, 2025	Republican	Mike Parson	1 2/3
49	David Wasinger	Jan 13, 2025	Incumbent	Republican	Mike Kehoe	

=== Notes ===
- A. The fractional terms of some lieutenant governors are not to be understood absolutely literally; rather, they are meant to show single terms during which multiple lieutenant governors served, due to resignations, deaths and the like.
- B. ^{a} ^{b} Resigned from office.
- C. ^{a} ^{b} Vacant due to resignation of lieutenant governor.
- D. ^{a} ^{b} ^{c} ^{d} ^{e} Vacant due to lieutenant governor becoming governor for remainder of unexpired term.
- E. ^{a} ^{b} ^{c} Died in office.
- F. ^{a} ^{b} ^{c} Vacant due to death of lieutenant governor.
- G. Vacant due to lieutenant governor acting as governor.
- H. The Missouri state convention declared the executive department of the state had expatriated itself and their offices vacant. Reynolds had fled the capital and aligned himself with the Confederacy.
- I. Hall was elected the provisional governor of Missouri by the state convention.
- J. Appointed lieutenant governor following the resignation of Lee.
- K. Resigned from office to take an appointed seat in the United States Senate.
- L. Wilson appointed lieutenant governor-elect Maxwell to fill vacancy until his official inauguration.
