= Leon Greenbaum =

American politician (1866–1925)

- Leon Greenbaum in 1901 edition of the Missouri Socialist
- Born: Leon Greenebaum; 25 May 1866; Philadelphia, PA
- Died: 9 June 1925 (aged 59); Los Angeles, CA
- Known for: First National Executive Secretary of the Socialist Party of America
- Spouse: Nettie Steinberg

Leon Greenbaum (born Greenebaum; 25 May 1866 – 9 June 1925) was an American socialist official, writer, lecturer, union organizer and political candidate from Missouri. He is best remembered as the first National Executive Secretary of the Socialist Party of America, serving in that capacity from 1901 to 1902.

== Biography ==
=== Early years ===
Greenbaum was born in Philadelphia into a German-Jewish family, the son of Marcus Greenebaum and Fannie Bachrach from Bavaria. He took a variety of jobs as a youth and a young man, working successively as an office boy, retail clerk, stenographer, and traveling salesman. Greenbaum had little formal education, but was a voracious reader and followed the path of self-education.

Greenbaum moved to the city of St. Louis, Missouri in 1891 to take a job in a mill. A resident of St. Louis, Greenbaum married Nettie Steinberg in that city in April 1894.

=== Political career ===
In 1896, while on a business trip, Greenbaum read the popular populist propaganda tract Coin's Financial School, by W. H. Harvey, later meeting the author. Greenbaum later attributed his attraction to radical politics to the experience.

Greenbaum became active in progressive reform politics during the last years of the 1890s, joining an effort to bring the system of initiative and referendum to Missouri in 1899. By 1900 he had joined the Social Democratic Party of America, for which he was active as a public speaker. He wrote an "economical romance" called Last Days of the Nineteenth Century.

He also became involved in the trade union movement, gaining election as the Secretary-Treasurer of the St. Louis Central Trades and Labor Union in July 1900.

Greenbaum was a multi-time candidate of the short-lived Social Democratic Party of America; in 1900, he was the nominee for Lieutenant Governor and in 1901 for mayor of St. Louis. Upon the formation of the Socialist Party of America in 1901, party headquarters were located in St. Louis and Greenbaum was the party's first Executive Secretary. During this time, he was also an organizer for the American Federation of Labor.

During his time as Executive Secretary, Greenbaum oversaw the difficult task of merging 23 loosely affiliated state parties into a national organization. For example, the Social-Democratic Party of Wisconsin refused to apply for a national charter and remained in the party "with all of the privileges but none of the obligations". There was also often conflict in deciding how to engage with the existing trade union and labor party movements.

Greenbaum was removed from office by a vote of 16-6 following his encouragement of the Socialist Party of California's fusion with the Union Labor Party in the 1902 local and state elections.

He died in 1925 in Los Angeles, aged 59.

=== Religious activity ===
In September 1915, Greenbaum left the The First Church of Christ, Scientist and started a short-lived offshoot which he called "The Primitive Church of Christ, Scientist," writing numerous pamphlets on behalf of his new church. As was common with many offshoots of the denomination, he continued to use the term "Christian Science" despite no longer being a part of the religion. He later disbanded his organization and became involved with the Church of Divine Science, a New Thought religious movement, and by 1918 was co-pastoring a congregation in St. Louis with his wife Nettie.

== Works ==
- Last Days of the Nineteenth Century. [c. 1900]. —Novel.
- The Trade Union Movement and the Socialist Party: A Comparative Study. St. Louis: Greeley Printery, 1903.
- Follow Christ. St. Louis: Primitive Publishing Co., 1916.
- The Spirit of a New-Old Religion. St. Louis: Primitive Publishing Co., 1916.
- Primitive Christianity. St. Louis: Primitive Publishing Co., 1916.
- The Two Churches. St. Louis: Primitive Publishing Co., 1916.
- Church Manual. St. Louis: Primitive Publishing Co., 1916.
- The Signs Following; or, Spiritual Law and Material Evidences. St. Louis: Primitive Publishing Co., 1917.
- How Christian Science Heals the Sick. St. Louis: Primitive Publishing Co., 1917.
- Mind and Money: A Text-book on Spiritual Economics; or, The Cosmic Laws of Wealth and Success. Los Angeles: Open Vision School of Truth, 1923.
