= Kate Richards O'Hare =

American politician (1876 – 1948)

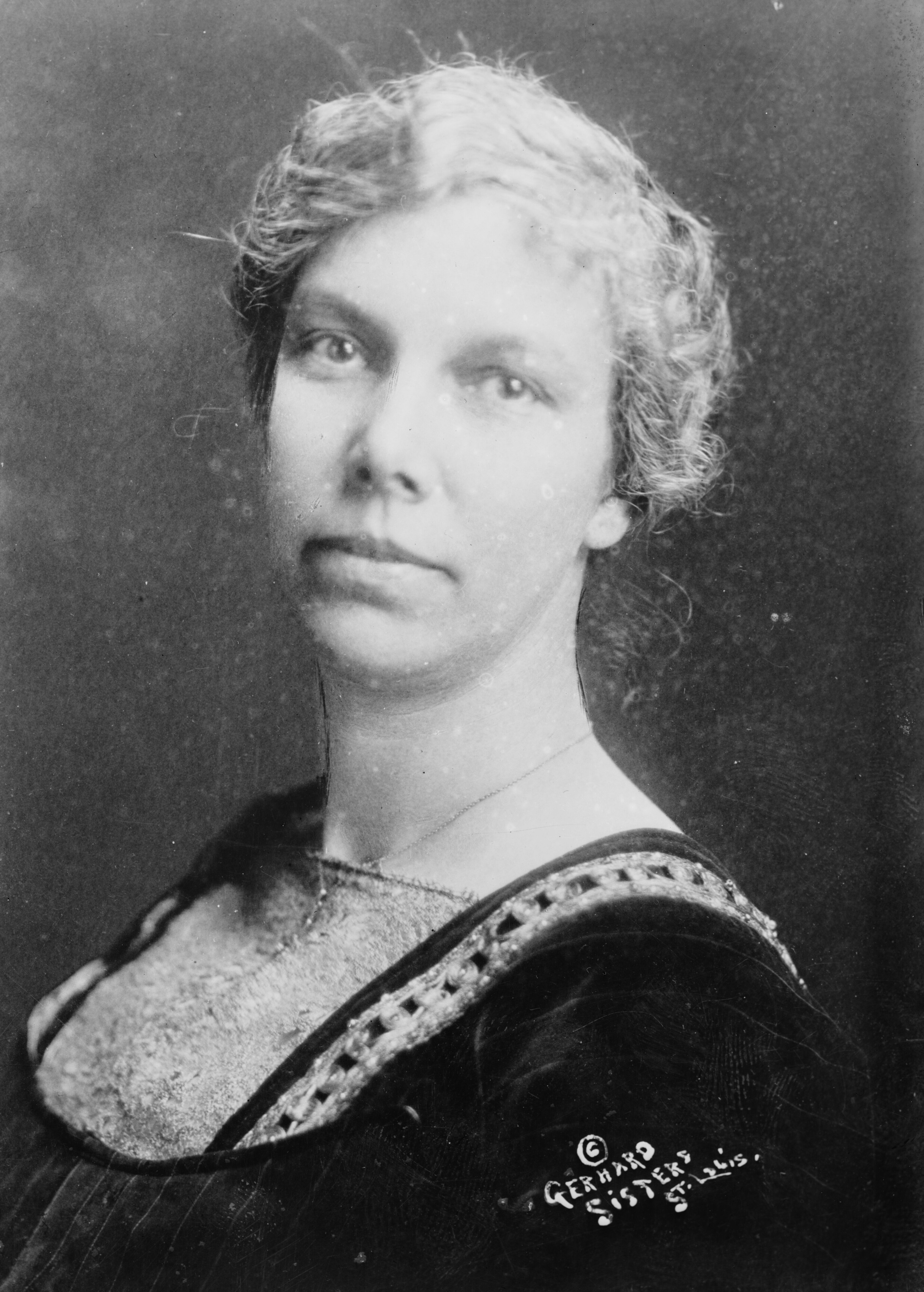
- Portrait by Gerhard Sisters c. 1915–1920
- Born: Carrie Katherine Richards; March 26, 1876; Ottawa County, Kansas, U.S.
- Died: January 10, 1948 (aged 71); Benicia, California, U.S.
- Known for: Imprisonment under the Espionage Act of 1917
- Political party: Socialist (before 1934); Democratic (after 1934)
- Spouse(s): Frank P. O'Hare (m. 1902; div. 1928) Charles C. Cunningham (m. 1928)

Carrie Katherine "Kate" Richards O'Hare (March 26, 1876 – January 10, 1948) was an American socialist, editor, and orator best known for her controversial imprisonment during World War I. O'Hare was a longtime member of the Socialist Party of America.

== Biography ==
=== Early years ===
Kate O'Hare was born Carrie Katherine Richards on March 26, 1876, in Ottawa County, Kansas. O'Hare's father, Andrew Richards (c. 1846–1916), was born to slaveowners but grew to hate the institution, and, at the outbreak of the American Civil War in 1861, enlisted as a bugler and drummer boy in the Union Army. After the war, Andrew Richards married his childhood sweetheart, Lucy, and the couple settled on the western Kansas frontier, where they raised Kate and her four siblings as socialists.

O'Hare attended Pawnee City Academy in Pawnee City, Nebraska graduating in 1894. O'Hare briefly worked as a teacher in Nebraska before becoming a secretary for, and later part owner of, her father's machinist shop in Kansas City. There she joined the International Association of Machinists and became involved in socialist politics. In 1901, she moved to Girard, Kansas to attend the International School of Social Economy where she met her future husband Frank P. O'Hare. The couple married in 1902 and moved to Chandler, Oklahoma. After moving to Oklahoma, O'Hare began organizing women for the Socialist Party of Oklahoma. In 1907, she was the party's nominee for Oklahoma Commissioner of Charities and Corrections. In 1909, the O'Hares returned to Kansas City.

=== Political career ===
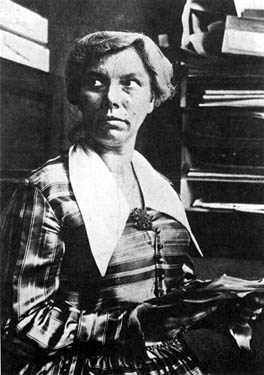
O'Hare c. 1913

She unsuccessfully ran as a candidate for the United States Congress in Kansas on the Socialist ticket in 1910.

In the pages of the National Rip-Saw, a St. Louis-based socialist journal in the 1910s, O'Hare championed reforms in favor of the working class and toured the country as an orator. In 1916 the Socialist Party of Missouri named O'Hare its candidate for U.S. Senate, heading the Socialist ticket in the state.

After America's entry into World War I in 1917, O'Hare led the Socialist Party's Committee on War and Militarism. For giving an anti-war speech in Bowman, North Dakota, O'Hare was convicted and sent to prison by federal authorities for violating the Espionage Act of 1917, an act criminalizing interference with recruitment and enlistment of military personnel. In this speech, to a small group of mainly women and children, O'Hare railed against the war, primarily focusing on how war benefited capitalism, but this part of the speech is not what she was arrested for, as the government prosecuted her over her allegedly saying that American mothers were "brood sows" and American soldiers "Fertilizer". O'Hare denied ever saying this, as she said she had given this same address hundreds of times, including in front of Justice Department officials. She instead said that what she said was "When the governments of Europe and the clergy of Europe demanded of the women that they give themselves in marriage, or out, in order that men might 'breed before they die,' that was not the crime of maddened passion, it was the cold blooded crime of brutal selfishness, and by that crime the women of Europe were reduced to the status of breeding animals on a stock farm." O'Hare's case was presided over by Judge Martin J.Wade, who was a committed anti-socialist. O'Hare was found guilty by the jury, and Wade handed down a harsh sentence of 5 years in prison when compared to the average sentence for violating the Espionage Act of 6 months. Judge Wade handed down the sentence with a 26-page speech where he railed against Socialism, calling it an un-American ideal, as well as arguing that O'Hare had attacked the family by attacking patriotic motherhood. O'Hare and her defenders argued that the trial was partisan and that it was an attempt to discredit the leader of the Nonpartisan League, which had sponsored her visit. With no federal penitentiaries for women existing at the time, she was delivered to Missouri State Penitentiary on a five-year sentence in 1919, but was pardoned by Calvin Coolidge in 1920 after a nationwide campaign to secure her release. In prison, O'Hare met the anarchists Emma Goldman and Gabriella Segata Antolini, and worked with them to improve prison conditions.

After her release and the war's end, support for the Amnesty movement waned. In April 1922, to free America's "Political Prisoners" she led the "Children’s Crusade", a cross country march, to prod President Harding to release others convicted of the same 1917 Espionage act she had been convicted. With support of the fledgling ACLU, the women and children stood at the gates of the White House for almost two months before Harding met with them, ultimately releasing many of the prisoners of conscience.

Unlike Socialist Party leader Eugene V. Debs and other prominent socialists at the time, O'Hare did not believe African Americans were equal to white Americans. She did not work toward racial equality, and was concerned about African-American men working in close contact with white American women. However, she was sympathetic to the plight of Native Americans, even though she felt that their sociocultural evolution was too slow for them to thrive in the US. She considered Jewish people to be largely equal to whites, and she occasionally participated in Jewish holiday celebrations with her friends.

=== Later years ===
Kate and Frank O'Hare were divorced in June 1928. In November of the same year, O'Hare married Charles C. Cunningham, an engineer and businessman, in California. Despite her continued involvement in politics, much of O'Hare's prominence gradually faded. O'Hare worked on behalf of Upton Sinclair's End Poverty in California campaign in the 1934 California gubernatorial election, and briefly served on the staff of Wisconsin Progressive Party politician Thomas R. Amlie from 1937 to 1938. Recognized as a penal reform advocate, she served as an assistant director of the California Department of Penology from 1939 to 1940.

=== Death and legacy ===
O'Hare died in Benicia, California, on January 10, 1948.

== Electoral history ==
1907 Oklahoma Commissioner of Charities and Corrections election
Party	Candidate	Votes	%	±%
Democratic	Kate Barnard	134,300	55.2	New
Republican	Haxel Tomlinson	98,960	40.7	New
Socialist	Kate Richards O'Hare	9,615	3.9	New
Democratic gain from		Swing	N/A	

== See also ==
- List of people pardoned or granted clemency by the president of the United States

== Works ==
- Americanism and Bolshevism. St. Louis, MO: F. P. O’Hare, 1919.
- "How I Became a Socialist Agitator," Socialist Woman [Girard, KS], October 1908, pp. 4–5.
- In Prison. New York: A.A. Knopf, 1923. (Internet Archive, )
- "Nigger" Equality. St. Louis, MO: National Rip-Saw, 1912.
- The Sorrows of Cupid. St. Louis, MO: National Rip-Saw, 1912.
- Socialism and the World War. St. Louis, MO: Frank P. O’Hare, 1919.
