= Frank P. O'Hare =

American socialist political activist (1877–1960)

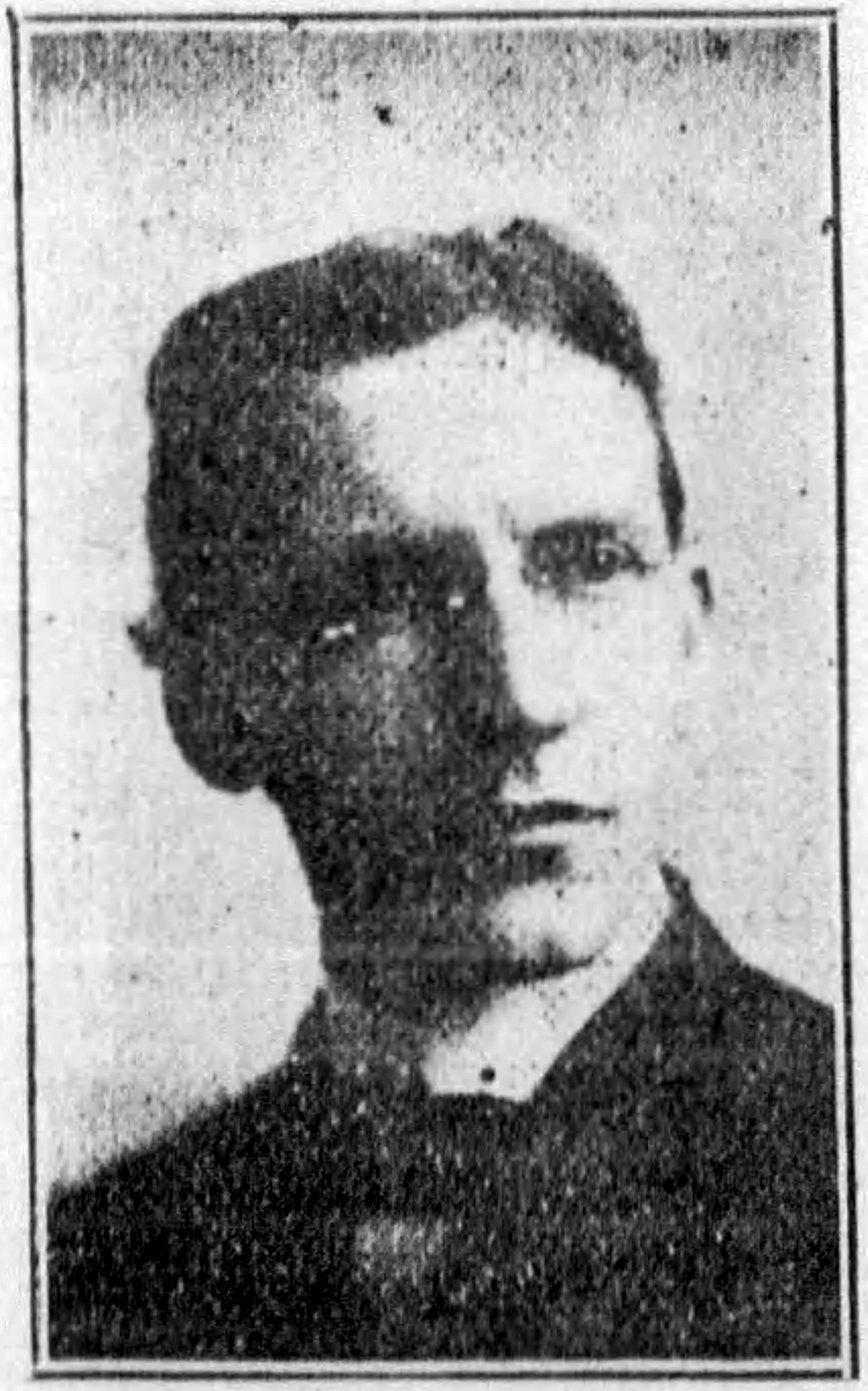
- O'Hare c. 1907
- Born: Francis Peter "Frank" O'Hare; April 23, 1877; New Hampton, Iowa, United States
- Died: 1960 (aged 82–83)
- Occupations: Socialist political activist, journalist, newspaper editor
- Spouse: Kate Richards (m. 1902; div. 1928)
- Parents: Peter Paul O'Hare (father); Elizabeth Weijers Petzold O'Hare (mother)

Francis Peter O'Hare (1877–1960), was an American socialist political activist, journalist, and newspaper editor. O'Hare is best remembered as the husband and helpmate of Kate Richards O'Hare, one of the preeminent female socialists of the first quarter of the 20th century, and as co-editor with her of National Rip-Saw, a St. Louis socialist weekly. Following the couple's 1928 divorce, Frank O'Hare made a career as a writer and columnist for the St. Louis Post-Dispatch.

== Biography ==
=== Early years ===
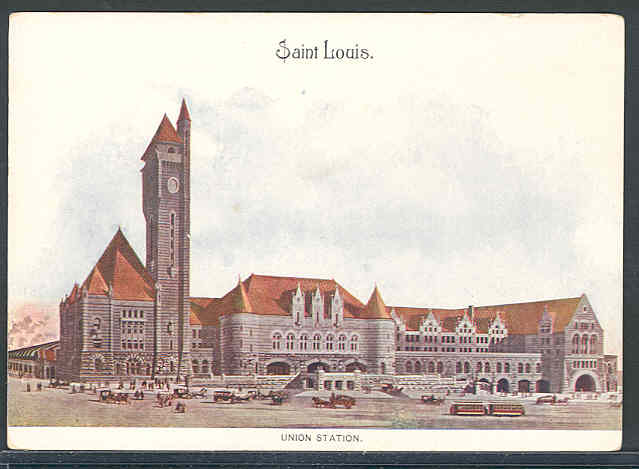
Frank O'Hare entered the work force in 1893 as a timekeeper and engineers' assistant helping in the construction of Union Station in St. Louis.

Francis Peter "Frank" O'Hare was born April 23, 1877, in New Hampton, Iowa, the son of Peter Paul O'Hare, an Irish-born itinerant laborer, miner, and adventurer, and the Dutch-born Elizabeth Weijers Petzold O'Hare, a widowed storekeeper. His father abandoned the family when Frank was a young boy, providing only minimal financial support for his wife and her four children over the years. Frank's mother was forced to take up sewing for sympathetic neighbors while his older half-brother entered the work force at an early age to help the family make ends meet.

In 1881 Frank's mother moved the family to St. Louis, Missouri, and it was there that the boy spent his formative years. The family lived in poverty in a small house, with the children raised to be devout Roman Catholics. Frank began attending public school in St. Louis in 1885 at the age of 8 and began working as a newspaper delivery boy just two years later. His newspaper route, delivering to 200 subscribers, brought Frank not only significant income, but helped introduce him to the newspaper business and political affairs at a very early age.

Frank's mother, who had raised him as a single parent, died in 1891 and the 14-year-old boy moved into a small apartment with his two older brothers, with his sister leaving the state to live with relatives. He managed to stay in school and work part-time for two more years but finally dropped out of high school to work full-time at the age of 16. Although the nation was then mired in the Panic of 1893, O'Hare managed to find temporary work as an engineers' assistant working for the Union Switch and Signal Company, a company which had been contracted to help with the construction of St. Louis's Union Station.

Following a quarrel with one of his brothers, Frank set off on his own, landing a job with a hardware wholesale company. It was while working in this capacity that O'Hare's religious upbringing was challenged for the first time by his supervisor, a university-educated intellectual of decidedly socialist inclinations, who introduced O'Hare to the writings of Herbert Spencer, John Stuart Mill, John Ruskin, Edward Bellamy, and Karl Marx.

"The whole Catholic fabrication fell away like an iceberg shattering in the gulf stream," O'Hare later recalled.

=== Entering the socialist movement ===
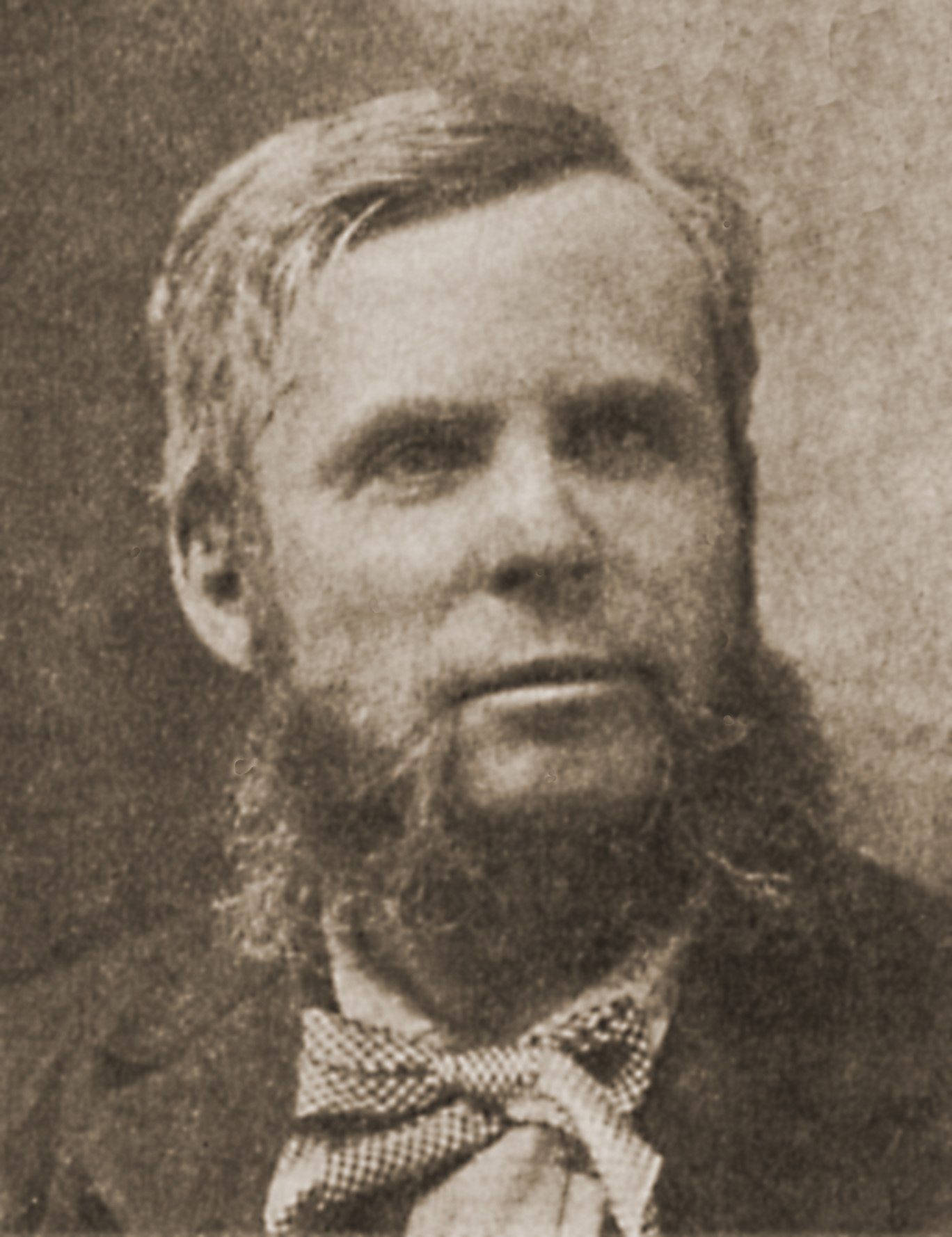
Walter Thomas Mills, whom Frank O'Hare joined in Kansas in 1901 to teach at a new Socialist Party training school.

O'Hare began to read extensively on his own at the St. Louis Public Library, took a class on economics, and attended public lectures addressing various social and political issues. During this process of self-directed inquiry O'Hare became acquainted with the writings of George D. Herron, a prominent Christian socialist and advocate of the Social Democratic Party of America (SDP), an organization which O'Hare joined in 1900. Additional socialist information was garnered from a correspondence course provided by Walter Thomas Mills.

O'Hare was fired from his job in 1901 for attempting to aid the Machinists' Union in their organizing efforts, a termination which brought him to a new wholesale position working for Western Electric. The new position put O'Hare into contact with union and non-union electrical workers, many of whom were disgruntled with the economic system and receptive to O'Hare's appeals to buy copies of the Appeal to Reason, a folksy mass-circulation socialist weekly published in Southeastern Kansas.

A St. Louis speech by SDP nominee Eugene V. Debs during the 1900 Presidential campaign further fortified O'Hare's commitment to that fledgling political organization. In the summer of 1901 the SDP united with a faction of the Socialist Labor Party of America to form the Socialist Party of America (SPA). O'Hare would remain an active member of that organization for the next thirty years.

In August 1901 Walter Thomas Mills came to St. Louis to invite O'Hare to enroll in the International School of Socialist Economy, a socialist training school to be launched in Girard, Kansas with the financial backing of Julius Wayland, publisher of the successful Appeal to Reason. Graduates of the 12 week program, which emphasized public speaking, debate, grammar, and parliamentary procedure, were expected to be tapped as national organizers for the newly founded SPA.

Another of the first 24 students at the new school that fall was Kate Richards, the daughter of a veteran Midwestern religious and political radical. The pair met in a classroom on October 9, 1901, and decided to marry just four days later, Frank O'Hare later recalled. The school's term ended on December 30, 1901 and the couple were married on New Year's Day 1902 in the Girard home of Appeal publisher Wayland, with Mills himself officiating the ceremony.

Following a brief honeymoon the O'Hares went to work as touring organizers for the SPA, traveling from town to town throughout the Midwest and delivering public speeches in an effort to build public awareness and launch locals of the new party. The couple made their first home in Kansas City, Kansas. Frank worked at Mills' training school as an instructor and a party organizer while his wife began work as a journalist in support of the socialist cause.

== Works ==
=== Written ===
- World Peace: A Spectacle Drama in Three Acts. With Kate Richards O'Hare. St. Louis, MO: National Rip-Saw Publishing Co., 1915.
- "Kate O'Hare Visits Debs in Atlanta," The New Day [Chicago], vol. 1, no. 5 (July 10, 1920), pp. 1, 3.

=== Edited ===
- Kate O'Hare, Americanism and Bolshevism. St. Louis, MO: Frank P. O'Hare, 1919.
- Kate O'Hare, Kate O'Hare's Prison Letters. Girard, KS: Appeal to Reason, 1919.
- Kate O'Hare, Socialism and the World War. St. Louis, MO: Frank P. O'Hare, 1919.
- Kate O'Hare, The Truth About the O'Hare Case. St. Louis, MO: Frank P. O'Hare, 1919.

== See also ==
- Socialist Party of Missouri
