= 1868 United States presidential election in Missouri =

- November 3, 1868
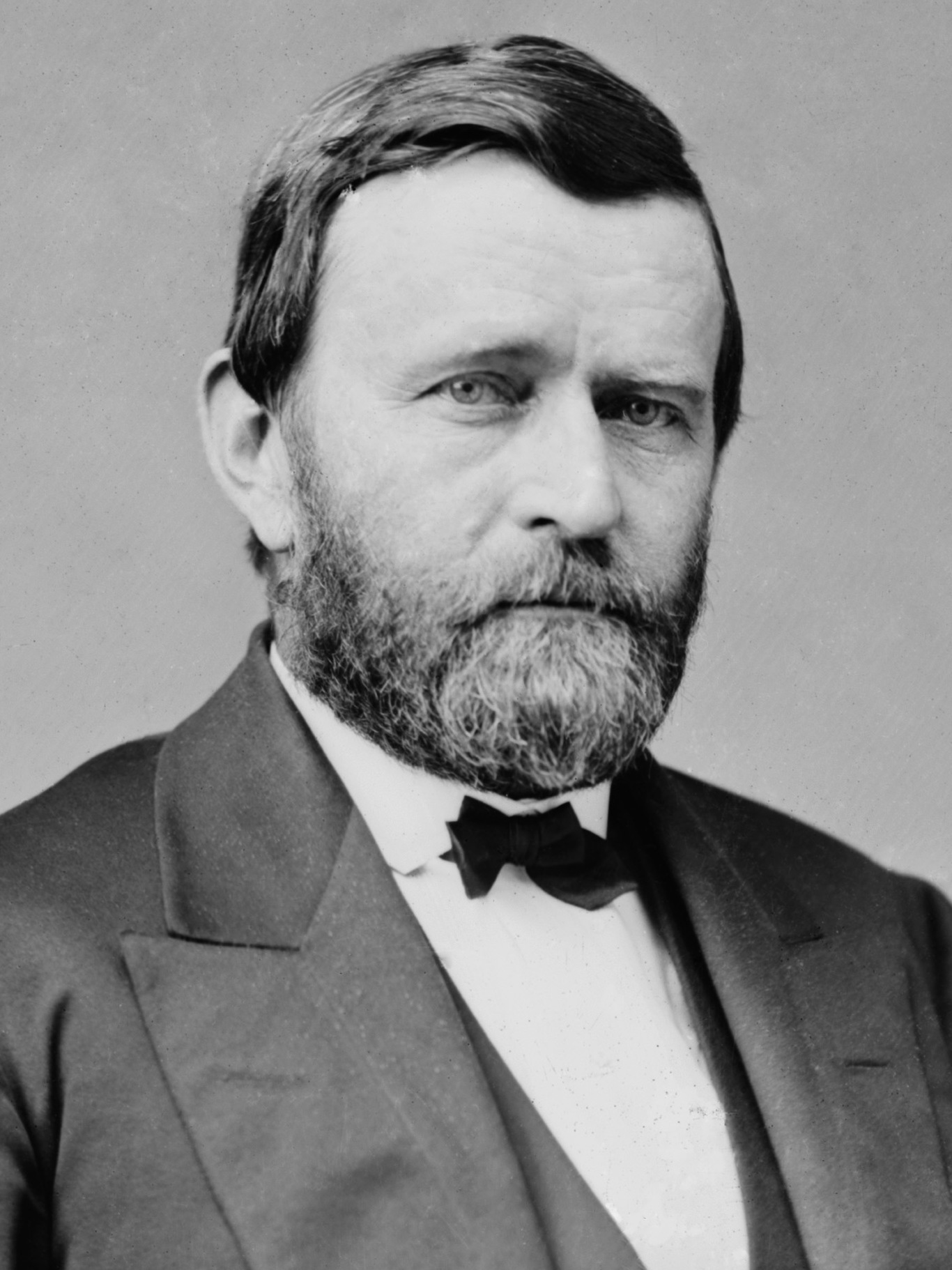

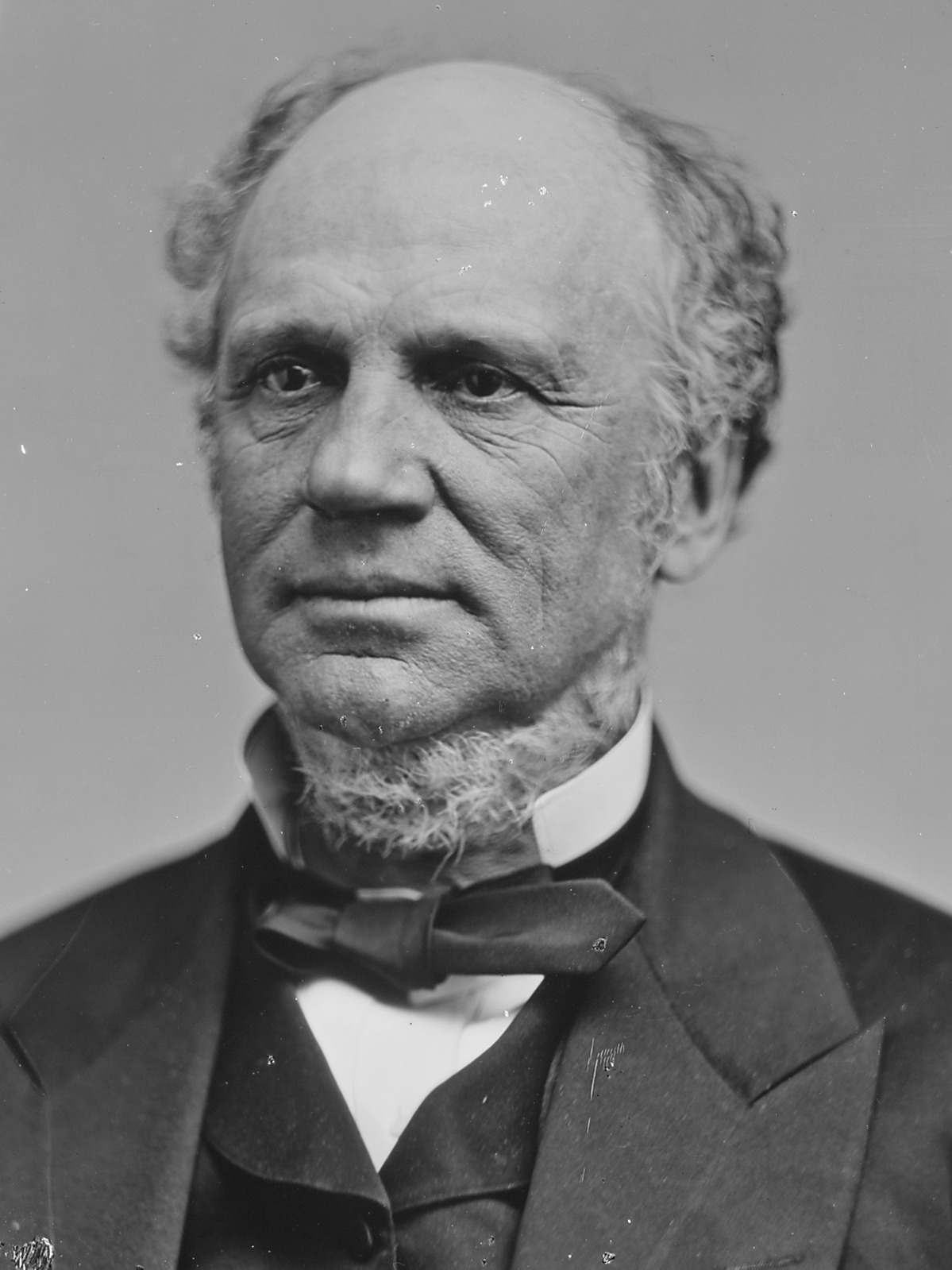
Nominee	Ulysses S. Grant	Horatio Seymour
Party	Republican	Democratic
Home state	Ohio	New York
Running mate	Schuyler Colfax	Francis Preston Blair Jr.
Electoral vote	11	0
Popular vote	86,860	65,628
Percentage	56.96%	43.04%
County results
Grant
50–60%
60–70%
70–80%
80–90%
90–100%
Seymour
50–60%
60–70%
70–80%
80–90%
90–100%
President before election
Andrew Johnson
Democratic
Elected President
Ulysses S. Grant
Republican

The 1868 United States presidential election in Missouri took place on November 3, 1868, as part of the 1868 United States presidential election. Voters chose 11 representatives, or electors, to the Electoral College, who voted for president and vice president.

Missouri was won by Ulysses S. Grant, formerly the 6th Commanding General of the United States Army (R-Ohio), running with Speaker of the House Schuyler Colfax, with 56.96% of the popular vote, against the 18th governor of New York, Horatio Seymour (D–New York), running with former Senator Francis Preston Blair Jr., with 43.04% of the vote.

Grant's victory in Missouri made him the second Republican presidential candidate to win the state, but the first to do so exclusively on the Republican ticket, as President Abraham Lincoln had won the state on the National Union ticket in 1864. Schuyler Colfax became the first Republican vice presidential candidate to win the state, as Lincoln's running mate on the National Union ticket in 1864 was Democrat Andrew Johnson. Grant would also be the last Republican to carry the state until Theodore Roosevelt won it in 1904.

== Results ==
1868 United States presidential election in Missouri
Party	Candidate	Votes	%
Republican	Ulysses S. Grant	86,860	56.96%
Democratic	Horatio Seymour	65,628	43.04%
Total votes		152,488	100%

=== Results by county ===
1868 United States Presidential Election in Missouri (by county)
County	Ulysses S. Grant Republican		Horatio Seymour Democratic		Total votes cast
County	#	%	#	%	Total votes cast
Adair	930	76.35%	288	23.65%	1,218
Andrew	1,412	73.27%	515	26.73%	1,927
Atchison	781	81.02%	183	18.98%	964
Audrain	312	52.79%	279	47.21%	591
Barry	371	53.54%	322	46.46%	693
Barton	277	54.74%	229	45.26%	506
Bates	782	55.78%	620	44.22%	1,402
Benton	705	68.18%	329	31.82%	1,034
Bollinger	331	80.73%	79	19.27%	410
Boone	177	50.86%	171	49.14%	348
Buchanan	1,971	58.98%	1,371	41.02%	3,342
Caldwell	844	69.29%	374	30.71%	1,218
Callaway	202	34.59%	382	65.41%	584
Camden	406	75.46%	132	24.54%	538
Cape Girardeau	1,009	54.72%	835	45.28%	1,844
Carroll	967	54.42%	810	45.58%	1,777
Carter	33	45.21%	40	54.79%	73
Cass	1,010	46.54%	1,160	53.46%	2,170
Cedar	630	68.18%	294	31.82%	924
Chariton	799	48.93%	834	51.07%	1,633
Christian	573	82.09%	125	17.91%	698
Clark	1,080	78.15%	302	21.85%	1,382
Clay	293	48.27%	314	51.73%	607
Clinton	585	47.60%	644	52.40%	1,229
Cole	861	53.38%	752	46.62%	1,613
Cooper	972	66.67%	486	33.33%	1,458
Crawford	385	47.18%	431	52.82%	816
Dade	734	83.60%	144	16.40%	878
Dallas	620	75.70%	199	24.30%	819
Daviess	1,089	60.77%	703	39.23%	1,792
DeKalb	597	69.91%	257	30.09%	854
Dent	214	57.07%	161	42.93%	375
Douglas	445	95.09%	23	4.91%	468
Franklin	1,624	58.63%	1,146	41.37%	2,770
Gasconade	1,074	88.83%	135	11.17%	1,209
Gentry	769	63.45%	443	36.55%	1,212
Greene	1,304	63.80%	740	36.20%	2,044
Grundy	1,082	77.95%	306	22.05%	1,388
Harrison	1,428	75.04%	475	24.96%	1,903
Henry	980	57.99%	710	42.01%	1,690
Hickory	479	81.05%	112	18.95%	591
Holt	1,080	88.74%	137	11.26%	1,217
Howard	171	11.98%	1,256	88.02%	1,427
Howell	170	88.54%	22	11.46%	192
Iron	308	59.57%	209	40.43%	517
Jackson	1,441	32.07%	3,052	67.93%	4,493
Jasper	1,099	71.22%	444	28.78%	1,543
Jefferson	796	48.86%	833	51.14%	1,629
Johnson	1,512	63.72%	861	36.28%	2,373
Knox	759	68.94%	342	31.06%	1,101
Laclede	400	51.81%	372	48.19%	772
Lafayette	709	58.50%	503	41.50%	1,212
Lawrence	850	68.16%	397	31.84%	1,247
Lewis	830	50.15%	825	49.85%	1,655
Lincoln	459	53.87%	393	46.13%	852
Linn	1,216	65.17%	650	34.83%	1,866
Livingston	1,127	58.85%	788	41.15%	1,915
Macon	1,221	52.29%	1,114	47.71%	2,335
Madison	217	57.41%	161	42.59%	378
Maries	145	31.52%	315	68.48%	460
Marion	973	58.05%	703	41.95%	1,676
McDonald	193	82.48%	41	17.52%	234
Mercer	1,082	74.06%	379	25.94%	1,461
Miller	573	78.49%	157	21.51%	730
Mississippi	20	5.75%	328	94.25%	348
Moniteau	781	69.12%	349	30.88%	1,130
Monroe	174	11.79%	1,302	88.21%	1,476
Montgomery	703	59.38%	481	40.62%	1,184
Morgan	586	60.79%	378	39.21%	964
New Madrid	10	2.84%	342	97.16%	352
Newton	778	78.90%	208	21.10%	986
Nodaway	1,104	65.25%	588	34.75%	1,692
Oregon	5	2.14%	229	97.86%	234
Osage	634	48.84%	664	51.16%	1,298
Ozark	156	73.58%	56	26.42%	212
Pemiscot	3	2.00%	147	98.00%	150
Perry	602	51.37%	570	48.63%	1,172
Pettis	1,022	56.18%	797	43.82%	1,819
Phelps	530	56.68%	405	43.32%	935
Pike	1,008	38.37%	1,619	61.63%	2,627
Platte	567	42.79%	758	57.21%	1,325
Polk	892	68.35%	413	31.65%	1,305
Pulaski	176	61.75%	109	38.25%	285
Putnam	1,255	83.50%	248	16.50%	1,503
Ralls	225	53.70%	194	46.30%	419
Randolph	223	13.64%	1,412	86.36%	1,635
Ray	769	59.02%	534	40.98%	1,303
Reynolds	53	27.75%	138	72.25%	191
Ripley	45	29.41%	108	70.59%	153
Saline	602	61.49%	377	38.51%	979
Schuyler	509	67.96%	240	32.04%	749
Scotland	775	52.29%	707	47.71%	1,482
Scott	247	51.78%	230	48.22%	477
Shannon	4	3.27%	172	97.73%	176
Shelby	579	65.50%	305	35.50%	884
St. Charles	1,542	58.39%	1,099	41.61%	2,641
St. Clair	570	64.41%	315	35.59%	885
St. Francois	254	40.25%	377	59.75%	631
St. Louis	16,182	54.53%	13,491	45.47%	29,673
Ste. Genevieve	246	28.84%	607	71.16%	853
Stoddard	222	65.49%	117	34.51%	339
Stone	177	63.21%	103	36.79%	280
Sullivan	926	61.98%	568	38.02%	1,494
Taney	208	80.00%	52	20.00%	260
Texas	202	67.11%	99	32.89%	301
Vernon	341	36.98%	581	63.02%	922
Warren	851	69.87%	367	30.13%	1,218
Washington	419	36.72%	722	63.28%	1,141
Webster	548	62.13%	334	37.87%	882
Worth	369	51.39%	349	48.61%	718
Wright	298	74.87%	100	25.13%	398
Totals	86,860	56.96%	65,628	43.04%	152,488

== See also ==
- United States presidential elections in Missouri
