= 1840 United States presidential election in Missouri =

- November 2, 1840
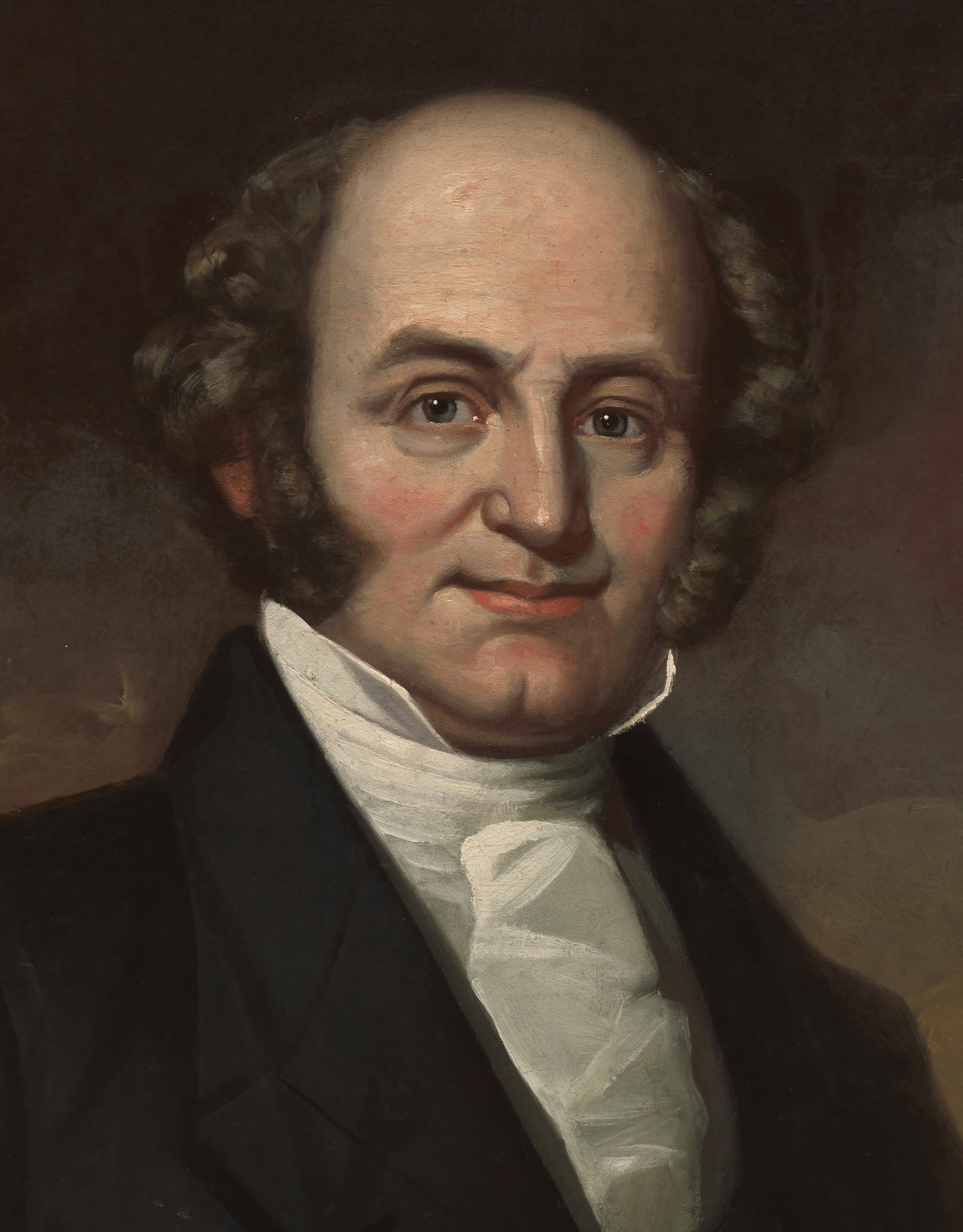

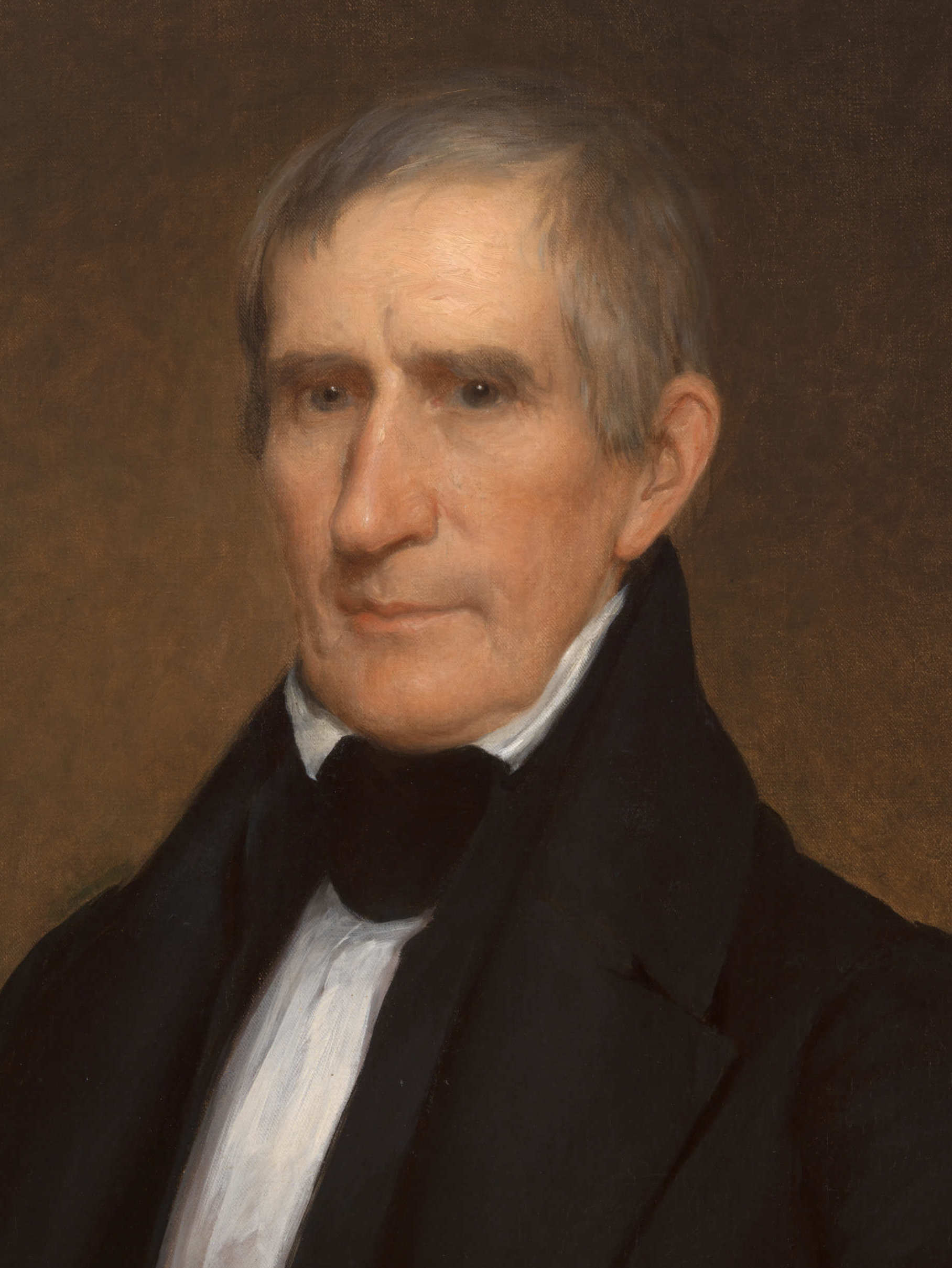
Nominee	Martin Van Buren	William Henry Harrison
Party	Democratic	Whig
Home state	New York	Ohio
Running mate	none	John Tyler
Electoral vote	4	0
Popular vote	29,969	22,954
Percentage	56.63%	43.37%
County results
Van Buren
50–60%
60–70%
70–80%
80–90%
90–100%
Harrison
50–60%
60–70%
Unknown/No vote
President before election
Martin Van Buren
Democratic
Elected President
William Henry Harrison
Whig

A presidential election was held in Missouri on November 2, 1840 as part of the 1840 United States presidential election. Voters chose four representatives, or electors to the Electoral College, who voted for President and Vice President.

Missouri voted for the Democratic candidate, Martin Van Buren, over Whig candidate William Henry Harrison. Van Buren won Missouri by a margin of 13.26%.

== Results ==
1840 United States presidential election in Missouri
Party	Candidate	Votes	%
Democratic	Martin Van Buren	29,969	56.63%
Whig	William Henry Harrison	22,954	43.37%
Total votes		52,923	100%

=== Results by county ===
1840 United States presidential election in Missouri (by county)
County	Martin Van Buren Democratic		William Henry Harrison Whig		Total Votes Cast
County	#	%	#	%	Total Votes Cast
Audrain	122	48.03%	132	51.97%	254
Barry	436	81.65%	98	18.35%	534
Benton	501	76.96%	150	23.04%	651
Boone	500	31.02%	1,112	68.98%	1,612
Buchanan	1,128	76.84%	340	23.16%	1,468
Caldwell	154	54.66%	133	46.34%	287
Callaway	626	41.54%	881	58.46%	1,507
Cape Girardeau	764	62.67%	455	37.33%	1,219
Carroll	182	61.90%	112	38.10%	294
Chariton	391	61.38%	246	38.62%	637
Clark	264	52.38%	240	47.62%	504
Clay	457	41.32%	649	58.68%	1,106
Clinton	268	66.17%	137	33.83%	405
Cole	962	73.44%	348	26.56%	1,310
Cooper	694	47.15%	778	52.85%	1,472
Crawford	264	52.38%	240	47.62%	504
Daviess	264	60.83%	170	39.17%	434
Franklin	552	60.86%	355	39.14%	907
Gasconade	636	82.38%	136	17.62%	772
Greene	432	71.64%	171	28.36%	603
Howard	901	54.47%	753	45.53%	1,654
Jackson	711	62.48%	427	37.52%	1,138
Jefferson	321	51.86%	298	48.14%	619
Johnson	374	62.44%	225	37.56%	599
Lafayette	475	48.72%	500	51.28%	975
Lewis	602	52.62%	542	47.38%	1,144
Lincoln	543	54.03%	462	45.97%	1,005
Linn	235	71.65%	93	28.35%	328
Livingston	487	66.17%	249	33.83%	736
Macon	500	57.21%	374	42.79%	874
Madison	275	64.40%	152	35.60%	427
Marion	534	39.24%	827	60.76%	1,361
Miller	317	93.79%	21	6.21%	338
Monroe	618	43.13%	815	56.87%	1,433
Montgomery	262	43.23%	344	56.77%	606
Morgan	404	70.51%	169	29.49%	573
New Madrid	194	34.83%	363	65.17%	557
Newton	630	77.97%	178	22.03%	808
Perry	339	51.52%	319	48.48%	658
Pettis	262	62.53%	157	37.47%	419
Pike	746	50.47%	732	49.53%	1,478
Platte	960	68.04%	451	31.96%	1,411
Polk	860	78.11%	241	21.89%	1,101
Pulaski	729	78.81%	196	21.19%	925
Ralls	335	45.58%	400	54.42%	735
Randolph	405	44.02%	515	55.98%	920
Ray	563	56.58%	432	43.42%	995
Ripley	325	95.59%	15	4.41%	340
Rives	421	58.47%	299	41.53%	720
Saline	322	46.20%	375	53.80%	697
Scott	500	63.78%	284	36.22%	784
Shelby	226	49.24%	233	50.76%	459
St. Charles	459	43.92%	586	56.08%	1,045
St. Francois	199	47.38%	221	52.62%	420
St. Louis	1,874	42.70%	2,515	57.30%	4,389
Ste. Genevieve	222	56.63%	170	43.37%	392
Stoddard	308	81.70%	69	18.30%	377
Taney (Note: 41 votes were cast for the Whig presidential candidate, but because of an error by the county clerk, no list of Whig electors was provided, and therefore these votes were not counted.)	258	100.00%	0	0.00%	258
Van Buren	360	63.38%	208	36.62%	568
Warren	348	50.43%	342	49.57%	690
Washington	514	51.76%	479	48.24%	993
Wayne	211	78.73%	57	21.27%	268
Totals	29,668	56.36%	22,971	43.64%	52,639

== See also ==
- United States presidential elections in Missouri
