= 1856 United States presidential election in Missouri =

- November 4, 1856
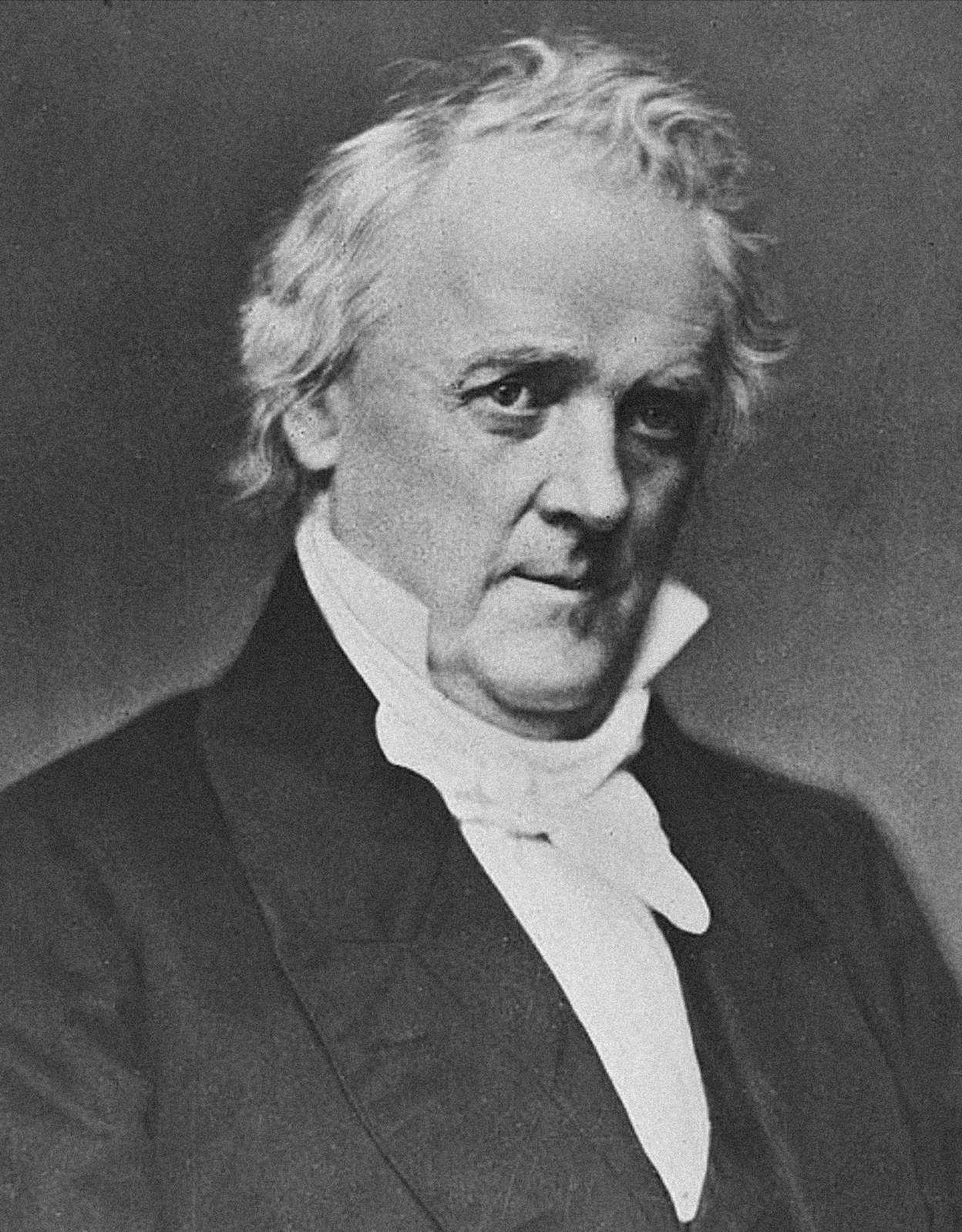

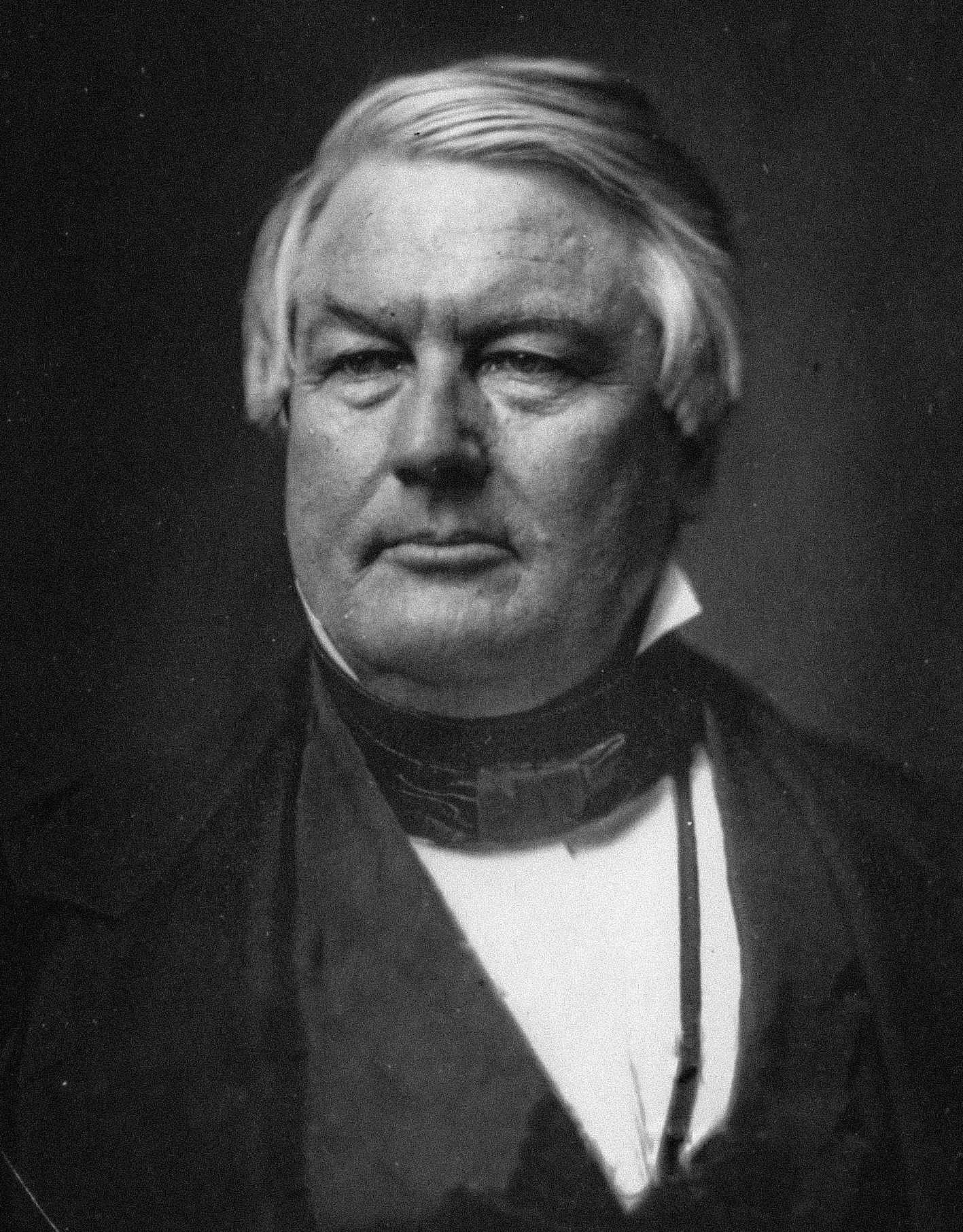
Nominee	James Buchanan	Millard Fillmore
Party	Democratic	Know Nothing
Home state	Pennsylvania	New York
Running mate	John C. Breckinridge	Andrew J. Donelson
Electoral vote	9	0
Popular vote	57,964	48,522
Percentage	54.43%	45.57%
County results
Buchanan
50–60%
60–70%
70–80%
80–90%
90–100%
Fillmore
50–60%
60–70%
Unknown/No vote
President before election
Franklin Pierce
Democratic
Elected President
James Buchanan
Democratic

The 1856 United States presidential election in Missouri was held on November 4, 1856. Voters chose nine electors to represent the state in the Electoral College, which chose the president and vice president.

Missouri voted for the Democratic nominee James Buchanan, who received 54% of the vote.

Republican Party nominee John C. Frémont was not on the ballot.

As of the 2024 United States presidential election, this is the last time Gasconade County voted for a Democratic presidential candidate, which, as of 2025, makes it the longest Republican winning streak in presidential elections in the nation.

== Results ==
1856 United States presidential election in Missouri
Party	Candidate	Votes	%
Democratic	James Buchanan	57,964	54.43%
Know Nothing	Millard Fillmore	48,522	45.57%
Total votes		106,486	100%

=== Results by county ===
1856 United States Presidential Election in Missouri (By County)
County	James Buchanan Democratic		Millard Fillmore Know Nothing		Total votes cast
County	#	%	#	%	Total votes cast
Adair	410	59.16%	283	40.84%	693
Andrew	889	67.50%	428	32.50%	1,317
Atchison	345	72.33%	132	27.67%	477
Audrain	521	47.97%	565	52.03%	1,086
Barry	488	76.73%	148	23.27%	636
Barton	64	54.70%	53	45.30%	117
Bates	409	61.60%	255	38.40%	664
Benton	467	74.60%	159	25.40%	626
Bollinger	413	67.48%	199	32.52%	612
Boone	958	41.89%	1,329	58.11%	2,287
Buchanan	1,036	57.43%	768	42.57%	1,804
Butler	143	80.79%	34	19.21%	177
Caldwell	295	55.45%	237	44.55%	532
Callaway	805	42.37%	1,095	57.63%	1,900
Camden	269	56.16%	210	43.84%	479
Cape Girardeau	898	57.49%	664	42.51%	1,562
Carroll	659	62.29%	399	37.71%	1,058
Cass	561	48.49%	596	51.51%	1,157
Cedar	391	70.58%	163	29.42%	554
Chariton	559	55.96%	440	44.04%	999
Clark	587	44.88%	721	55.12%	1,308
Clay	675	47.17%	756	52.83%	1,431
Clinton	397	49.44%	406	50.56%	803
Cole	552	68.06%	259	31.94%	811
Cooper	778	49.71%	787	50.29%	1,565
Crawford	434	48.55%	460	51.45%	894
Dade	418	55.66%	333	44.34%	751
Dallas	454	77.47%	132	22.53%	586
Daviess	572	60.08%	380	39.92%	952
DeKalb	336	66.14%	172	33.86%	508
Dent	396	83.72%	77	16.28%	473
Dunklin	147	59.27%	101	40.73%	248
Franklin	846	61.44%	531	38.56%	1,377
Gasconade	403	64.69%	220	35.31%	623
Gentry	757	65.65%	396	34.35%	1,153
Greene	1,029	50.64%	1,003	49.36%	2,032
Grundy	335	48.91%	350	51.09%	685
Harrison	495	60.89%	318	39.11%	813
Henry	369	47.86%	402	52.14%	771
Hickory	333	76.38%	103	23.62%	436
Holt	409	63.02%	240	36.98%	649
Howard	867	52.19%	798	47.93%	1,665
Jackson	1,168	56.64%	894	43.36%	2,062
Jasper	398	57.43%	294	42.42%	692
Jefferson	387	42.53%	523	57.47%	910
Johnson	540	39.02%	844	60.98%	1,384
Knox	471	54.64%	391	45.36%	862
Laclede	821	78.49%	225	21.51%	1,046
Lafayette	654	33.59%	1,293	66.41%	1,947
Lawrence	574	61.59%	358	38.41%	932
Lewis	761	54.24%	642	45.76%	1,403
Lincoln	846	59.66%	572	40.34%	1,418
Linn	400	51.09%	383	48.91%	783
Livingston	501	53.81%	430	46.19%	931
Macon	934	68.22%	435	31.78%	1,369
Madison	418	54.08%	355	45.92%	773
Maries	246	78.59%	67	21.41%	313
Marion	727	35.50%	1,321	64.50%	2,048
McDonald	299	83.06%	61	16.94%	360
Mercer	450	51.90%	417	48.10%	867
Miller	224	67.47%	108	32.53%	332
Mississippi	327	50.78%	317	49.22%	644
Moniteau	427	52.46%	387	47.54%	814
Monroe	762	42.95%	1,012	57.05%	1,774
Montgomery	365	37.71%	603	62.29%	968
Morgan	403	63.97%	227	36.03%	630
New Madrid	234	44.23%	295	55.77%	529
Newton	528	69.11%	236	30.89%	764
Nodaway	438	70.53%	183	29.47%	621
Oregon	324	63.91%	183	36.09%	507
Osage	412	65.29%	219	34.71%	631
Ozark	49	49.00%	51	51.00%	100
Pemiscot	119	51.74%	111	48.26%	230
Perry	586	73.90%	207	26.10%	793
Pettis	319	42.48%	432	57.52%	751
Pike	1,113	49.60%	1,131	50.40%	2,244
Platte	1,263	54.84%	1,040	45.16%	2,303
Polk	662	61.64%	412	38.36%	1,074
Pulaski	268	79.76%	68	20.24%	336
Putnam	488	65.50%	257	34.50%	745
Ralls	369	40.86%	534	59.14%	903
Randolph	595	49.54%	606	50.46%	1,201
Ray	874	54.02%	744	45.98%	1,618
Reynolds	114	58.16%	82	41.84%	196
Ripley	306	88.18%	41	11.82%	347
Saline	599	41.25%	853	58.75%	1,452
Schuyler	472	62.19%	287	37.81%	759
Scotland	632	64.23%	352	35.77%	984
Scott	222	39.15%	345	60.85%	567
Shannon	40	74.07%	14	25.93%	54
Shelby	373	46.34%	432	53.66%	805
St. Charles	772	56.97%	583	43.03%	1,355
St. Clair	347	62.30%	210	37.70%	557
St. Francois	541	57.43%	401	42.57%	942
St. Louis	5,530	44.73%	6,834	55.27%	12,364
Ste. Genevieve	356	53.61%	308	46.39%	664
Stoddard	315	67.60%	151	32.40%	466
Stone	137	97.86%	3	2.14%	140
Sullivan	553	68.02%	260	31.98%	813
Taney	388	91.94%	34	8.06%	422
Texas	479	84.04%	91	15.96%	570
Vernon	302	63.71%	172	36.29%	474
Warren	369	49.40%	378	50.60%	747
Washington	578	54.27%	487	45.73%	1,065
Wayne	287	74.16%	100	25.84%	387
Webster	468	71.23%	189	28.77%	657
Wright	267	80.66%	64	19.34%	331
Totals	58,360	54.62%	48,495	45.38%	106,855

== See also ==
- United States presidential elections in Missouri
