= 1828 United States presidential election in Missouri =

- October 31 – December 2, 1828

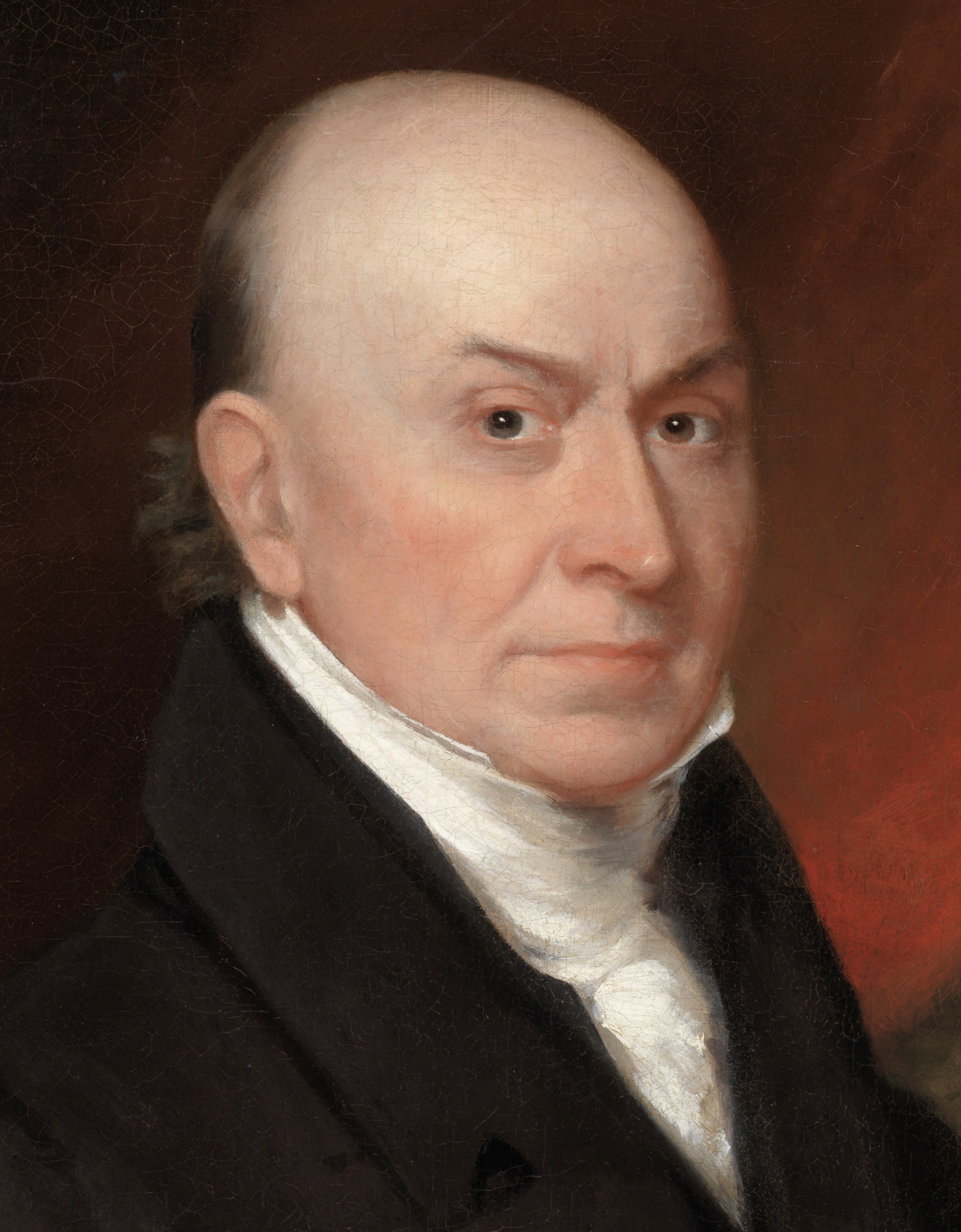
Nominee	Andrew Jackson	John Quincy Adams
Party	Democratic	National Republican
Home state	Tennessee	Massachusetts
Running mate	John C. Calhoun	Richard Rush
Electoral vote	3	0
Popular vote	8,232	3,422
Percentage	70.64%	29.36%
County results
Jackson
50–60%
60–70%
70–80%
80–90%
90–100%
Adams
50–60%
No data/vote

The 1828 United States presidential election in Missouri took place between October 31 and December 2, 1828, as part of the 1828 United States presidential election. Voters chose three representatives, or electors, to the Electoral College, who voted for president and vice president.

Missouri voted for the Democratic candidate, Andrew Jackson, over the National Republican candidate, John Quincy Adams. Jackson won Missouri by a margin of 41.28%. To date this is the best performance ever for a Democrat in Missouri.

== Results ==
1828 United States presidential election in Missouri
Party	Candidate	Votes	Percentage	Electoral votes
Democratic	Andrew Jackson	8,232	70.64%	3
National Republican	John Quincy Adams (incumbent)	3,422	29.36%	0
Totals		11,654	100.0%	3

=== Results by county ===
1828 United States presidential election in Missouri (by county)
County	Andrew Jackson Democratic		John Quincy Adams National Republican		Total votes cast
County	#	%	#	%	Total votes cast
Boone	520	63.73%	296	36.27%	816
Callaway	267	62.09%	163	37.91%	430
Cape Girardeau	457	75.54%	148	24.46%	605
Chariton	361	77.97%	102	22.03%	463
Clinton	364	74.44%	125	25.56%	489
Cole	331	87.80%	46	12.20%	377
Cooper	458	69.29%	203	30.71%	661
Franklin	267	89.60%	31	10.40%	298
Gasconade	205	97.16%	6	2.84%	211
Howard	658	64.96%	355	35.04%	1,013
Jackson	210	98.59%	3	1.41%	213
Jefferson	152	67.86%	72	32.14%	224
Lafayette	322	84.29%	60	15.71%	382
Lincoln	231	34.38%	441	65.63%	672
Madison	271	82.87%	56	17.13%	327
Marion	159	75.00%	53	25.00%	212
Montgomery	234	64.82%	127	35.18%	361
New Madrid	58	63.74%	33	36.26%	91
Perry	196	80.00%	49	20.00%	245
Pike	260	52.21%	238	47.79%	498
Ralls	117	70.06%	50	29.94%	167
Ray	186	89.86%	21	10.14%	207
Saline	150	83.33%	30	16.67%	180
Scott	66	74.16%	23	25.84%	89
St. Charles	218	65.27%	116	34.73%	334
St. Francois	189	67.99%	89	32.01%	278
St. Louis	699	61.21%	443	38.79%	1,142
Ste. Genevieve	112	70.00%	48	30.00%	160
Washington	150	83.33%	30	16.67%	180
Wayne	213	97.71%	5	2.29%	218
Totals	8,287	69.30%	3,672	30.70%	11,959

== See also ==
- United States presidential elections in Missouri
