= 1836 United States presidential election in Missouri =

- November 7, 1836
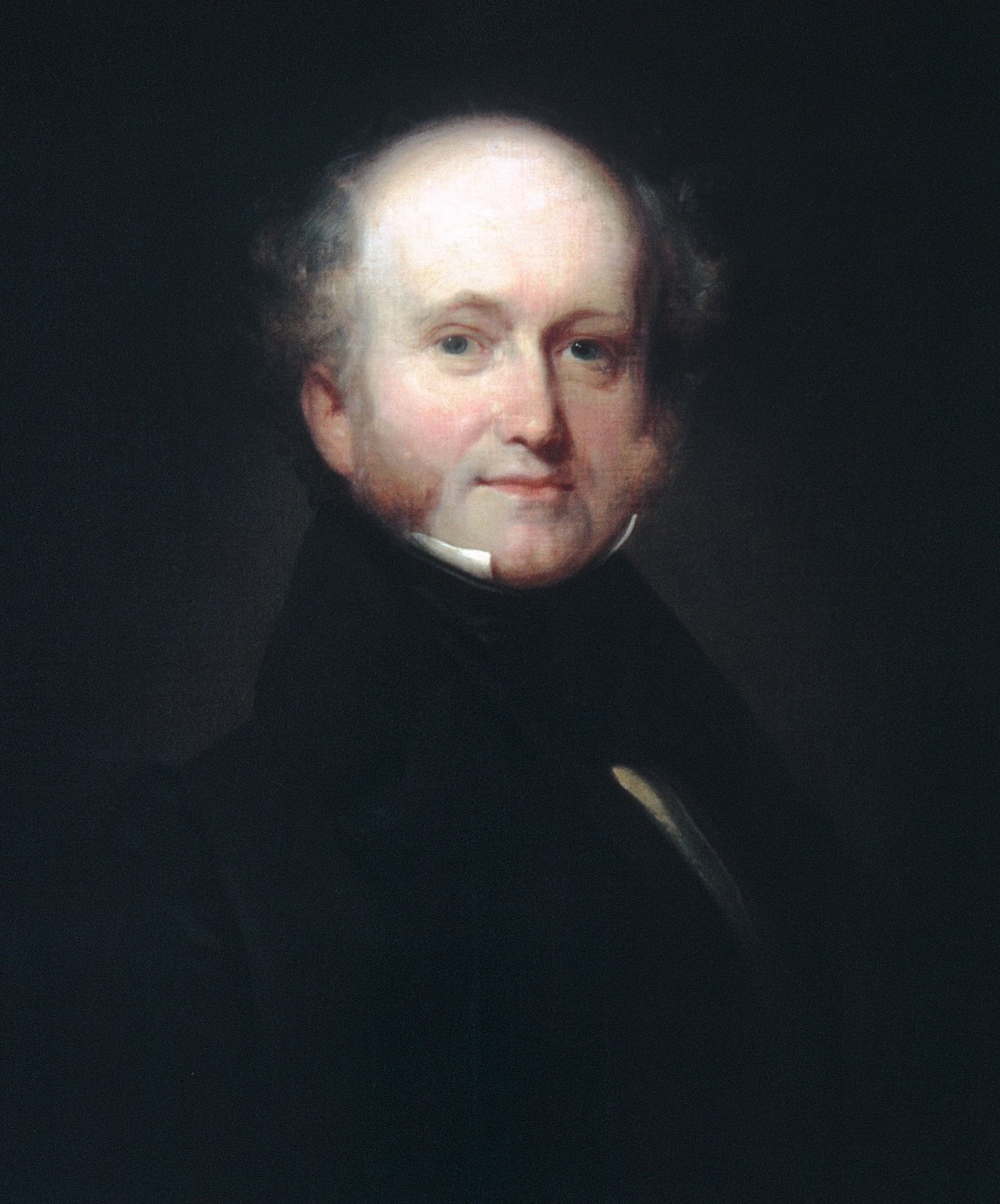

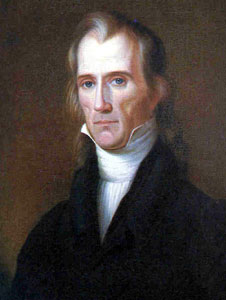
Nominee	Martin Van Buren	Hugh Lawson White
Party	Democratic	Whig
Home state	New York	Tennessee
Running mate	Richard Mentor Johnson	John Tyler
Electoral vote	4	0
Popular vote	10,995	7,337
Percentage	59.98%	40.02%
County results
Van Buren
50–60%
60–70%
70–80%
80–90%
90–100%
White
50–60%
60–70%
No Data/Vote

A presidential election was held in Missouri on November 7, 1836, as part of the 1836 United States presidential election. Voters chose four representatives, or electors to the Electoral College, who voted for President and Vice President.

Missouri voted for the Democratic nominee, Martin Van Buren, over Whig nominee Hugh Lawson White. Van Buren won Missouri by a margin of 19.96%.

== Results ==
1836 United States presidential election in Missouri
Party	Candidate	Votes	Percentage	Electoral votes
Democratic	Martin Van Buren	10,995	59.98%	4
Whig	Hugh Lawson White	7,337	40.02%	0
Totals		18,332	100.0%	4

=== Results by county ===
1836 United States presidential election in Missouri (by county) (Note: No returns from Cooper, New Madrid, Scott, Van Buren, or Wayne have been located.)
County	Martin Van Buren Democratic		Hugh Lawson White Whig		Total votes cast
County	#	%	#	%	Total votes cast
Barry	55	100.00%	0	0.00%	55
Benton	75	94.94%	4	5.06%	79
Boone	567	44.26%	714	55.74%	1,281
Callaway	616	58.00%	446	42.00%	1,062
Cape Girardeau	435	74.49%	149	25.51%	584
Carroll	142	81.14%	33	18.86%	175
Chariton	188	69.12%	84	30.88%	272
Clay	347	55.17%	282	44.83%	629
Clinton	129	73.30%	47	26.70%	176
Cole	576	88.75%	73	11.25%	649
Crawford	86	59.31%	59	40.69%	145
Franklin	238	64.15%	133	35.85%	371
Gasconade	115	58.67%	81	41.33%	196
Greene	140	92.72%	11	7.28%	151
Howard	619	63.62%	354	36.38%	973
Jackson	489	72.77%	183	27.23%	672
Jefferson	138	60.79%	89	39.21%	227
Johnson	240	75.47%	78	24.53%	318
Lafayette	294	64.05%	165	35.95%	459
Lewis	298	60.20%	197	39.80%	495
Lincoln	236	46.18%	275	53.82%	511
Madison	109	66.46%	55	33.54%	164
Marion	338	49.63%	343	50.37%	681
Monroe	317	53.10%	280	46.90%	597
Montgomery	92	35.25%	169	64.75%	261
Morgan	216	80.90%	51	19.10%	267
Perry	173	91.05%	17	8.95%	190
Pettis	161	71.56%	64	28.44%	225
Pike	415	50.61%	405	49.39%	820
Polk	80	55.17%	65	44.83%	145
Pulaski	230	82.44%	49	17.56%	279
Ralls	151	55.31%	122	44.69%	273
Randolph	399	67.17%	195	32.83%	594
Ray	221	48.79%	232	51.21%	453
Ripley	70	97.22%	2	2.78%	72
Rives	108	72.97%	40	27.03%	148
Saline	178	56.87%	135	43.13%	313
Shelby	63	67.02%	31	32.98%	94
St. Charles	237	45.66%	282	54.34%	519
St. Francois	137	48.75%	144	51.25%	281
St. Louis	681	44.69%	843	55.31%	1,524
Ste. Genevieve	97	67.36%	47	32.64%	144
Stoddard	70	80.46%	17	19.54%	87
Warren	76	33.63%	150	66.37%	226
Washington	311	55.94%	245	44.06%	556
Totals	10,953	59.55%	7,440	40.45%	18,393

== See also ==
- United States presidential elections in Missouri
