= 1824 United States presidential election in Missouri =

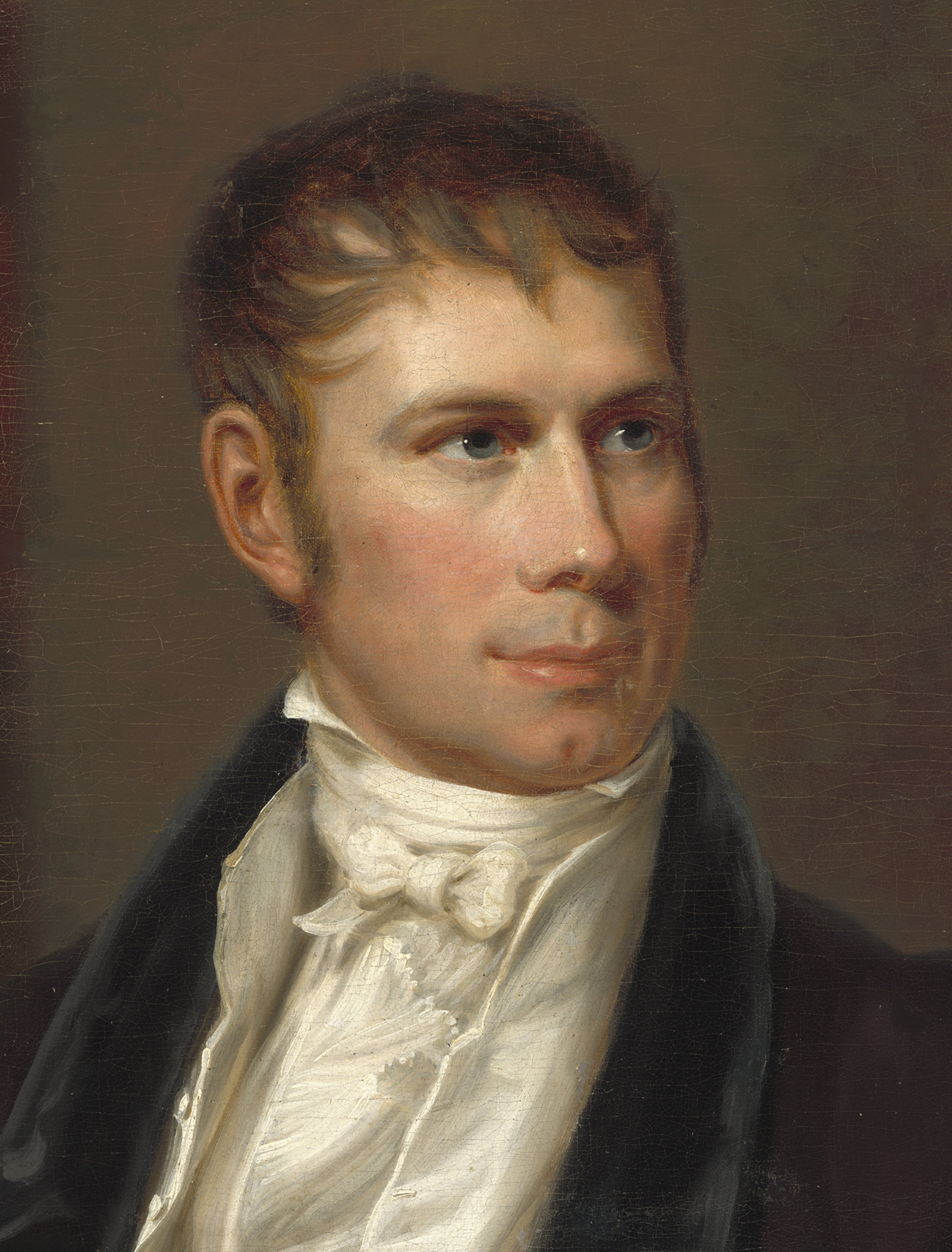

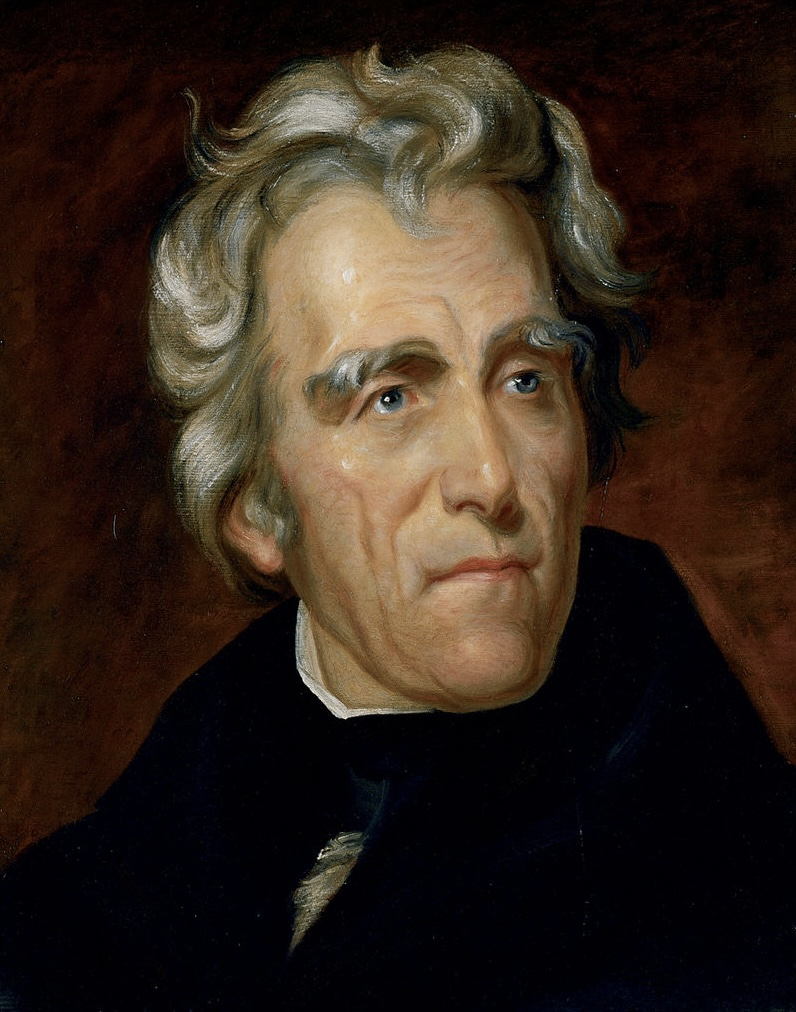

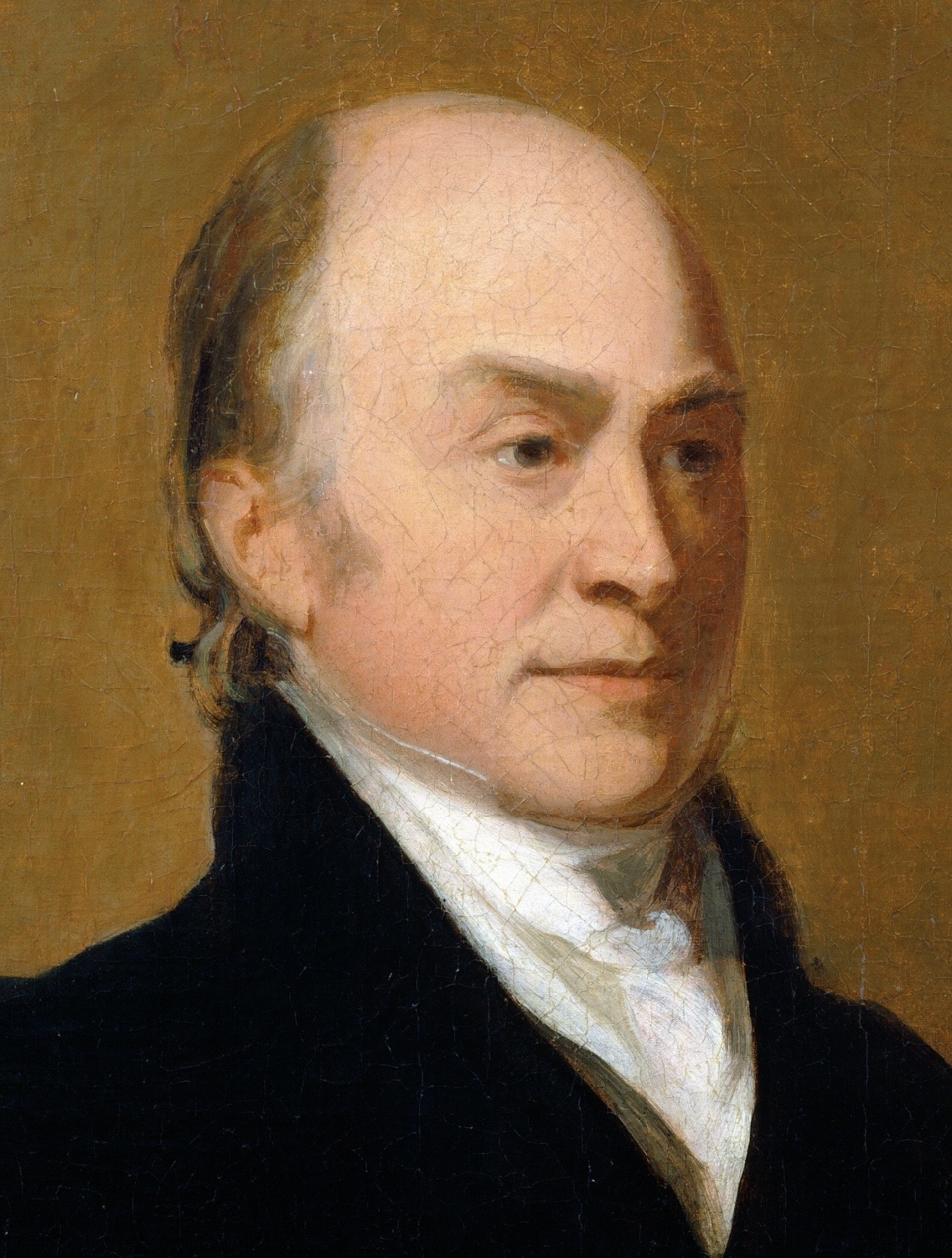
| Nominee | Henry Clay | Andrew Jackson | John Quincy Adams |
| Party | Democratic-Republican | Democratic-Republican | Democratic-Republican |
| Home state | Kentucky | Tennessee | Massachusetts |
| Running mate | Andrew Jackson | John C. Calhoun | John C. Calhoun |
| Electoral vote | 3 | 0 | 0 |
| Popular vote | 2,042 | 1,168 | 186 |
| Percentage | 59.39% | 33.97% | 5.41% |

Clay
30–40%
40–50%
50–60%
60–70%
70–80%
80–90%
90–100%
Jackson
50–60%
60–70%
70–80%
90–100%
President before election
James Monroe
Democratic-Republican
Elected President
John Quincy Adams
Democratic-Republican

In Missouri, the 1824 United States presidential election resulted in the state's electoral college votes going to Henry Clay, but then its vote in the House of Representatives contingent election going to the eventual winner, John Quincy Adams. In the 1824 presidential election, five major candidates emerged: Clay, Adams, Andrew Jackson, William H. Crawford, and John C. Calhoun, although Calhoun dropped out to run for the vice presidency. In the new state of Missouri, Crawford had little support, Clay was the popular favorite, Jackson was popular in rural areas, and Adams had some support in urban areas, particularly St. Louis. Clay won the popular vote, with Jackson second, Adams third, and Crawford fourth, and Clay received Missouri's three votes in the electoral college.

Nationwide, none of the candidates had received a majority of the electoral votes, so the top three finishers went to the House of Representatives for a final election. Clay, Missouri's choice, finished fourth nationwide and did not qualify for the House election. This left John Scott, Missouri's representative in the House, to decide who the state would vote for in the contingent election. Clay endorsed Adams, but Jackson had been much more popular in the state than Adams, so there was no clear choice for Scott. Of Missouri's two United States senators, David Barton advised Scott to vote for Adams, while Thomas Hart Benton backed Jackson.

Scott decided to vote for Adams, who won the overall election. Clay had performed some background maneuvering in favor of Adams, and received an appointment as secretary of state. Jackson, who had finished with the most electoral votes in the initial run, considered Adams' election a "corrupt bargain". Scott's decision to vote for Adams proved unpopular in Missouri, and he lost his bid for re-election in 1826. Jackson defeated Adams in the 1828 United States presidential election.

== Background ==
In the late 1810s and early 1820s, the United States was in a national political environment known as the Era of Good Feelings, and the two major parties – the Democratic-Republican Party and the Federalist Party – both supported James Monroe in the 1820 United States presidential election. However, there were still party divisions, with the partisan contests becoming mainline Democratic-Republicans opposing a mixed group of Federalists and dissatisfied Democratic-Republicans. The 1824 presidential election featured four major candidates: Andrew Jackson, John Quincy Adams, William H. Crawford, and Henry Clay. John C. Calhoun had also been an important candidate, but dropped out of the presidential race for the vice presidency. All five of those candidates laid claim to the political legacy of Thomas Jefferson. Crawford, who had the support of party elites, ran as a party traditionalist, while Jackson was a populist. Clay was a proponent of protective tariffs and internal improvements, and Calhoun positioned himself as a candidate that could appeal to both the northern and southern regions of the country. Adams was highly experienced, but in the words of historian Donald Ratcliffe, "was a humorless, stiff-necked, distant patrician".

The state of Missouri was a new one, having only joined the United States in 1821, and Missouri statehood was contentious due to national debates over the expansion or restriction of slavery, which was legal in Missouri. The disagreements were temporarily resolved by the Missouri Compromise, which allowed the admission of Missouri as a slave state. At this time, two of the major factions in Missouri politics were families who retained power developed during French rule of the area, and newer arrivals who had come after the United States took control. Power at the time was based in the city of St. Louis. The French faction and its American supporters were known as the "little junto", which was opposed by the "antijunto". A lack of party organization and fluid alliances meant that the division between the two factions was not a bright line.

In 1824, Missouri had a single representative in the United States House of Representatives, John Scott, and two United States Senators, Thomas Hart Benton and David Barton. Benton was initially aligned with the little junto, which Scott was also a member of, while Barton did not directly ally with either group. By 1824, Benton was shifting his political positions, and he and Barton had come into direct opposition, due to different political viewpoints and events such as the 1823 Barton–Rector duel. Benton, Barton, and Scott all backed Clay in the presidential election, although Benton did not fully support Clay's stances and had previously backed a ticket of Crawford as presidential candidate and Clay for the vice president. Benton also believed that supporting Clay would help his political transition away from the little junto, and he also wanted to prevent Jackson from taking the state, as Benton worried that Jacksonian ascendancy would end his political career.

== Campaign ==
Clay was the favorite candidate in Missouri. He was a Kentuckian, as were many settlers of Missouri, and he appealed to both urban and rural residents. Coming from what was then the Western United States, he appealed to rural residents, while urban voters backed his American System economic plan. Jackson was also popular in the rural areas, with historian Perry McCandless stating that Jackson "appealed to the spirit of voter unrest". Adams was associated with the northern United States and with the Federalists, which made him less popular in Missouri, although he did have some support in urban regions, particularly St. Louis. Crawford had no particular support in Missouri, and his campaign was affected when he had a stroke. Scott did not do much campaigning in the presidential election cycle, primarily just issuing a circular, while Benton campaigned the most. Historian Alan S. Weiner notes that it is possible that Barton only campaigned to offset the influence of Benton.

Official popular vote tallies in this era were often inaccurate. McCandless cites the final popular vote tallies for the state as 2,042 for Clay, 1,168 for Jackson, 186 for Adams, 37 for Crawford, and 5 as "scattered". Unofficial figures compiled by historian Phil Lampi show figures of 2,042 for Clay, 1,166 for Jackson, 191 for Adams, and 35 for Crawford. Weiner provides voting breakdowns by electoral district. For the district in the Boonslick region, Weiner has 1,111 for Clay to 610 for Jackson. The Second District was near St. Louis, and Weiner gives returns of 604 for Clay, 239 for Jackson, and 159 for Adams. Southeast Missouri voted 327 for Clay, 317 for Jackson, and 32 for Adams, according to Weiner. Duff Green, a Jackson supporter, claimed that Clay had only won the southeastern Missouri district by voter fraud on the part of a returning officer.

Nationally, Jackson received 99 electoral college votes, Adams 84, Crawford 41, and Clay 37. For vice president in the electoral college, Calhoun received 182 votes, while Jackson, Clay, Martin Van Buren, Nathan Sanford, and Nathaniel Macon combined for 78. Missouri's three electoral votes went to Clay for president and Jackson for vice president. As none of the candidates had received a majority of the votes, the presidential election had to be decided in the United States House of Representatives. Only the top three candidates were considered for the House of Representatives election, which meant that Clay was eliminated from contention. It was unclear which candidate Missouri's representative should vote for. Crawford's illness rendered him a non-factor, and due to his lack of support in Missouri would not have been a viable candidate for Scott's vote anyway.

Scott had pledged to vote for the candidate favored by the people of Missouri, but who was the favored candidate was not obvious. Clay, Missouri's selection in the popular vote, endorsed Adams in December, but Jackson had been much more popular in Missouri than Adams and had won the most electoral votes. Scott decided to ask the Missouri General Assembly for voting instructions. Before Clay's elimination had been announced as official, a resolution in the Missouri Senate to provide instructions for Scott to vote for Jackson had been defeated, and after the final three candidates were officially known, another resolution to tell Scott to vote for Crawford for unanimously voted down. The Missouri House of Representatives voted to postpone any final decision after a pro-Jackson resolution was introduced, and a pro-Adams resolution only received two of 45 votes, but resolutions introduced by Robert William Wells to officially not endorse any candidate were unsuccessful as well. The rounds of voting on the resolutions had not proved an endorsement for Jackson, but had also indicated the general lack of support for Adams and Crawford in the legislature.

Both Barton and Benton provided Scott with advice. Benton decided to back Jackson. He wished to continue to distance himself from the junta, who supported Adams, and he also recognized that Jackson was simply much more popular in the state than Adams. Benton's opponents in Missouri accused him of duplicity due to his prior support for Clay and later switch to Jackson after Clay's elimination. Barton argued that Scott should vote for Adams, who had the endorsement of Missouri's choice, Clay. This decision led to Barton being viewed by many Missourians as supporting federalism and northern interest.

By January 1825, Clay was directly pressuring Scott to back Adams. Daniel Cook had held discussions with Scott, and informed Adams on January 20 that in order to get Scott's vote, Adams would need to provide some favors to the Missourian. January 21 saw a meeting between Scott and Adams; Scott asked for a government printing contract in Missouri to be given via patronage to a pro-Scott publisher, and the Missourian also asked Adams if he, as president, would have Scott's brother (who had killed a man in a duel) removed from a judicial post in the Arkansas Territory. Having received assurances about the printing contract and that his brother would not be removed, Scott declared to Adams that he would vote for him, although the next day Scott decided that he did not want to commit himself and met with Adams again to soften his guarantee.

On February 5, Scott informed Benton that he intended to vote for Adams; Benton responded angrily three days later. Benton's letter was publicly printed, and McCandless speculates that Benton had intended its benefit to be more for the general public than for Scott specifically. The letter also included a threat of an end to the friendship between Benton and Scott. On February 9, Calhoun was declared the winner of the vice president election, and the House of Representatives balloted for the presidential election. Adams was declared the winner, having carried the delegations of 13 states, compared to 7 for Jackson and 4 for Crawford. Scott, and thus Missouri, had voted for Adams. Clay had performed some maneuvering that played a role in Adams gaining the election, and Adams appointed Clay as secretary of state. Jackson accused Clay of working with Adams to gain the secretary of state office, and referred to the election as a "corrupt bargain".

== Results ==
1824 United States presidential election in Missouri
| Party | Candidate | Votes | Percentage | Electoral votes |
|---|---|---|---|---|
| Democratic-Republican | Henry Clay | 2,042 | 59.39% | 3 |
| Democratic-Republican | Andrew Jackson | 1,168 | 33.97% | 0 |
| Democratic-Republican | John Q. Adams | 186 | 5.41% | 0 |
| Democratic-Republican | William H. Crawford | 37 | 1.08% | 0 |
| N/A | Others | 5 | 0.15% | 0 |
| Totals | | 3,438 | 100.0% | 3 |

=== Results by county ===
1824 United States presidential election in Missouri (by county)
| County | Henry Clay Democratic-Republican | | Andrew Jackson Democratic-Republican | | John Quincy Adams Democratic-Republican | | William H. Crawford Democratic-Republican | | Total votes cast |
| County | # | % | # | % | # | % | # | % | Total votes cast |
|---|---|---|---|---|---|---|---|---|---|
| Boone | 267 | 73.96% | 94 | 26.04% | 0 | 0.00% | 0 | 0.00% | 361 |
| Callaway | 109 | 63.74% | 62 | 36.26% | 0 | 0.00% | 0 | 0.00% | 171 |
| Cape Girardeau | 102 | 31.87% | 180 | 56.25% | 26 | 8.13% | 12 | 3.75% | 320 |
| Chariton | 67 | 38.07% | 109 | 61.93% | 0 | 0.00% | 0 | 0.00% | 176 |
| Clay | 74 | 65.49% | 39 | 34.51% | 0 | 0.00% | 0 | 0.00% | 113 |
| Cole | 20 | 64.52% | 11 | 35.48% | 0 | 0.00% | 0 | 0.00% | 31 |
| Cooper | 136 | 71.96% | 53 | 28.04% | 0 | 0.00% | 0 | 0.00% | 189 |
| Howard | 377 | 80.38% | 92 | 19.62% | 0 | 0.00% | 0 | 0.00% | 469 |
| Jefferson | 23 | 35.38% | 22 | 33.85% | 3 | 4.62% | 17 | 26.15% | 65 |
| Lillard | 38 | 28.79% | 94 | 71.21% | 0 | 0.00% | 0 | 0.00% | 132 |
| Lincoln | 83 | 88.30% | 6 | 6.38% | 4 | 4.26% | 1 | 1.06% | 94 |
| Montgomery | 62 | 88.57% | 6 | 8.57% | 2 | 2.86% | 0 | 0.00% | 70 |
| New Madrid | 10 | 90.91% | 1 | 9.09% | 0 | 0.00% | 0 | 0.00% | 11 |
| Pike | 81 | 63.78% | 33 | 25.98% | 12 | 9.45% | 1 | 0.79% | 127 |
| Ralls | 78 | 55.32% | 62 | 43.97% | 1 | 0.71% | 0 | 0.00% | 141 |
| Ray | 13 | 27.08% | 35 | 72.92% | 0 | 0.00% | 0 | 0.00% | 48 |
| Saline | 10 | 32.26% | 21 | 67.74% | 0 | 0.00% | 0 | 0.00% | 31 |
| Scott | 12 | 48.00% | 11 | 44.00% | 2 | 8.00% | 0 | 0.00% | 25 |
| St. Charles | 61 | 41.50% | 46 | 31.29% | 40 | 27.21% | 0 | 0.00% | 147 |
| St. Francois | 22 | 38.60% | 35 | 61.40% | 0 | 0.00% | 0 | 0.00% | 57 |
| St. Louis | 239 | 56.24% | 86 | 20.24% | 100 | 23.53% | 0 | 0.00% | 425 |
| Ste. Genevieve | 50 | 80.65% | 10 | 16.13% | 1 | 1.61% | 1 | 1.61% | 62 |
| Washington | 107 | 69.93% | 44 | 28.76% | 0 | 0.00% | 2 | 1.31% | 153 |
| Wayne | 1 | 6.67% | 14 | 93.33% | 0 | 0.00% | 0 | 0.00% | 15 |
| Total | 2,042 | 59.48% | 1,166 | 33.96% | 191 | 5.56% | 34 | 0.99% | 3,433 |

=== Results by electoral district ===
As given by Philip J. Lampi's A New Nation Votes

Results by District
| District | Henry Clay Democratic-Republican | | | Andrew Jackson Democratic-Republican | | | John Quincy Adams Democratic-Republican | | | William H. Crawford Democratic-Republican | | | Total votes cast |
| District | # | % | Electors | # | % | Electors | # | % | Electors | # | % | Electors | Total votes cast |
|---|---|---|---|---|---|---|---|---|---|---|---|---|---|
| 1 | 1,111 | 64.56% | 1 | 610 | 35.44% | 0 | 0 | 0.00% | 0 | 0 | 0.00% | 0 | 1,721 |
| 2 | 604 | 60.16% | 1 | 239 | 23.80% | 0 | 159 | 15.84% | 0 | 2 | 0.20% | 0 | 1,004 |
| 3 (Note: The Crawford vote in this district was split between two elector candidates.) | 327 | 46.12% | 1 | 317 | 44.71% | 0 | 32 | 4.51% | 0 | 33 | 4.65% | 0 | 709 |
| Total | 2,042 | 59.46% | 3 | 1,166 | 33.95% | 0 | 191 | 5.56% | 0 | 35 | 1.02% | 0 | 3,434 |

== Aftermath ==
At first, it appeared that Scott and Barton's political forces had defeated that of Benton, and federal patronage in Missouri would pass through Barton and Scott, although the press generally criticized Scott's decision to vote for Adams. The next test came with the 1825 Missouri gubernatorial special election, which was to fill the vacancy left by the death of incumbent Frederick Bates. In that four-candidate election, Benton backed John Miller, while Barton and Scott supported David Todd. Miller won, and Todd finished third, well behind the leader. In 1826, Scott ran for re-election, but his vote for Adams was a major factor against him in the election, and he was defeated by Edward Bates, who ran a nonfactional platform. Public opposition to the Adams vote had increased since the presidential election. That same year, Benton was easily re-elected as senator.

Jackson was nominated for the 1828 United States presidential election in 1825. Several proposed reforms to prevent another election from going to the House of Representatives were brought up in that body, but none were successful. Political currents from the 1824 election over time led to the development of the Whig Party. The forces of Crawford and Jackson combined before the 1828 election. The 1828 election saw Jackson easily defeat Adams, leading to the rise of Jacksonian democracy.

== See also ==
- United States presidential elections in Missouri

== Sources ==
- Callahan, David P. (2022). The Politics of Corruption: The Election of 1824 and the Making of Presidents in Jacksonian America. Charlottesville, Virginia: University of Virginia Press. ISBN 9780813948430.
- McCandless, Perry (1972). A History of Missouri. Vol. II: 1820 to 1860. Columbia, Missouri: University of Missouri Press. ISBN 0-8262-0124-5.
- Ratcliffe, Donald (2014). "Popular Preferences in the Presidential Election of 1824". Journal of the Early Republic. 34 (1): 45–77. doi:10.1353/jer.2014.0009. S2CID 155015965.
- Ratcliffe, Donald (2015). The One-Party Presidential Contest: Adams, Jackson, and 1824's Five-Horse Race. Lawrence, Kansas: University Press of Kansas. ISBN 978-0-7006-2159-0.
- Weiner, Alan S. (1966). "John Scott, Thomas Hart Benton, David Barton and the Presidential Election of 1824: A Study in Pressure Politics". Missouri Historical Review. 60 (4): 460–494.
