= 1844 United States presidential election in Missouri =

- November 4, 1844

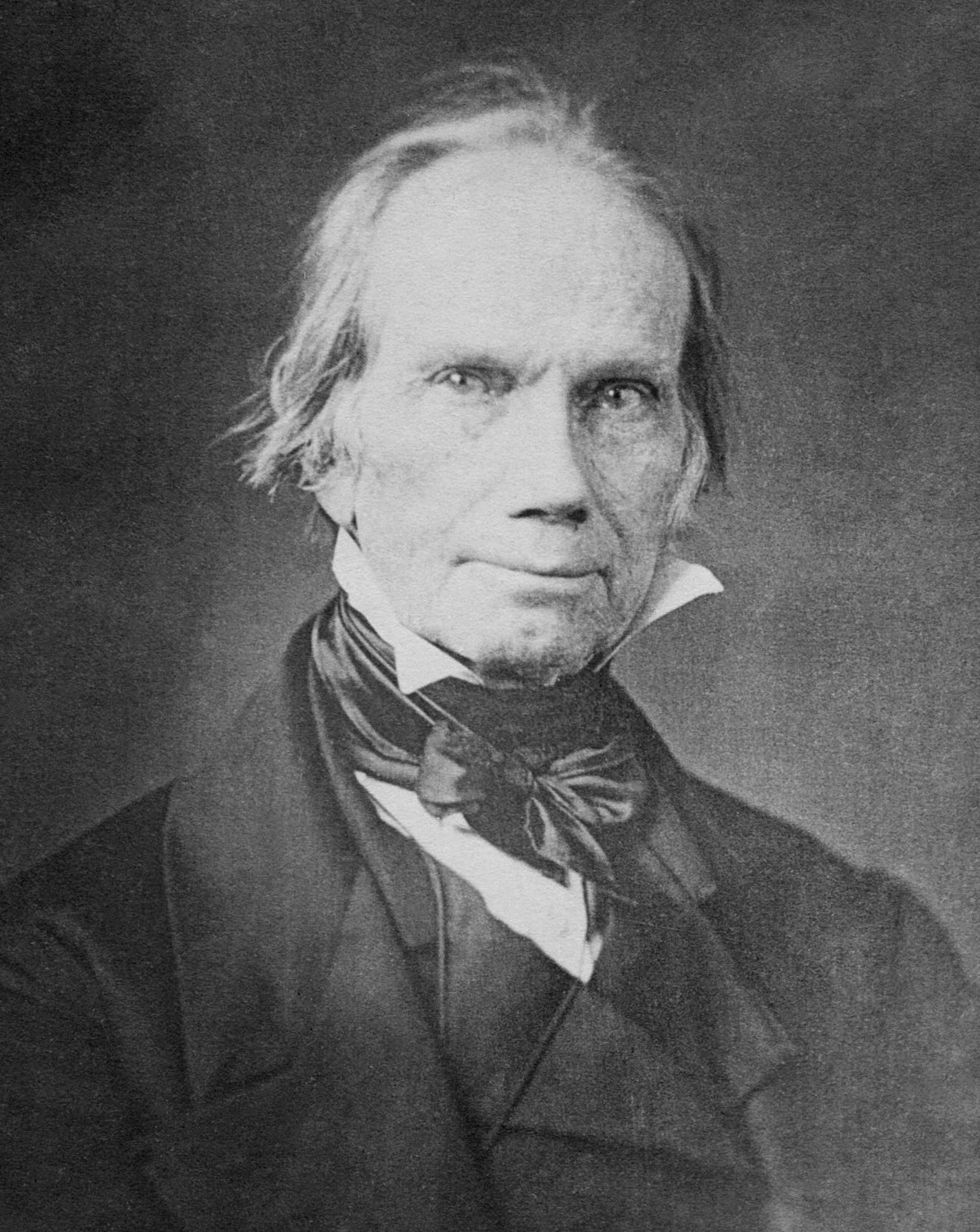
Nominee	James K. Polk	Henry Clay
Party	Democratic	Whig
Home state	Tennessee	Kentucky
Running mate	George M. Dallas	Theodore Frelinghuysen
Electoral vote	7	0
Popular vote	41,322	31,200
Percentage	56.98%	43.02%
County results
Polk
50–60%
60–70%
70–80%
80–90%
Clay
50–60%
60–70%
Unknown/no vote
President before election
John Tyler
Independent
Elected President
James K. Polk
Democratic

A presidential election was held in Missouri on November 4, 1844 as part of the 1844 United States presidential election. Voters chose seven representatives, or electors, to the Electoral College, who voted for president and vice president.

Missouri voted for the Democratic candidate, James K. Polk, over Whig candidate Henry Clay. Polk won Missouri by a margin of 13.96%.

== Results ==
1844 United States presidential election in Missouri
Party	Candidate	Votes	%
Democratic	James K. Polk	41,322	56.98%
Whig	Henry Clay	31,200	43.02%
Total votes		72,522	100%

=== Results by county ===
1844 United States presidential election in Missouri (by county)
County	James K. Polk Democratic		Henry Clay Whig		Total votes cast
County	#	%	#	%	Total votes cast
Adair	450	60.48%	294	39.52%	744
Andrew	941	71.02%	384	28.98%	1,325
Audrain	163	48.22%	175	51.78%	338
Barry	478	77.10%	142	22.90%	620
Bates	307	59.84%	206	40.16%	513
Benton	664	72.49%	252	27.51%	916
Boone	602	33.59%	1,190	66.41%	1,792
Buchanan	1,162	65.99%	599	34.01%	1,761
Caldwell	212	62.17%	129	37.83%	341
Callaway	793	45.76%	940	54.24%	1,733
Camden	247	77.92%	70	22.08%	317
Cape Girardeau	914	63.83%	518	36.17%	1,432
Carroll	311	56.24%	242	43.76%	553
Chariton	602	61.87%	371	38.13%	973
Clark	220	49.44%	225	50.56%	445
Clay	552	41.91%	765	58.09%	1,317
Clinton	567	64.65%	310	35.35%	877
Cole	1,122	72.86%	418	27.14%	1,540
Cooper	783	46.50%	901	53.50%	1,684
Crawford	367	60.76%	237	39.24%	604
Dade	690	73.02%	255	26.98%	945
Daviess	446	58.38%	318	41.62%	764
Decatur	208	78.49%	57	21.51%	265
Franklin	796	67.34%	386	32.66%	1,182
Gasconade	326	82.12%	71	17.88%	397
Greene	817	69.95%	351	30.05%	1,168
Grundy	365	51.34%	346	48.66%	711
Henry	283	50.27%	280	49.73%	563
Holt	378	67.14%	185	32.86%	563
Howard	969	48.89%	1,013	51.11%	1,982
Jackson	852	58.12%	614	41.88%	1,466
Jasper	242	67.79%	115	32.21%	357
Jefferson	349	51.63%	327	48.37%	676
Johnson	511	58.20%	367	41.80%	878
Lafayette	576	41.26%	820	58.74%	1,396
Lewis	403	51.47%	380	48.53%	783
Lincoln	683	54.16%	578	45.84%	1,261
Linn	494	64.74%	269	35.26%	763
Livingston	351	63.93%	198	36.07%	549
Macon	457	58.29%	327	41.71%	784
Madison	399	68.56%	183	31.44%	582
Marion	723	41.55%	1,017	58.45%	1,740
Miller	369	83.30%	74	16.70%	443
Monroe	578	42.19%	792	57.81%	1,370
Montgomery	232	39.26%	359	60.74%	591
Morgan	544	67.49%	262	32.51%	806
New Madrid	208	41.11%	298	58.89%	506
Newton	663	77.82%	189	22.18%	852
Niangua	345	81.95%	76	18.05%	421
Osage	434	78.34%	120	21.66%	554
Perry	463	54.60%	385	45.40%	848
Pettis	319	58.32%	228	41.68%	547
Pike	809	48.44%	861	51.56%	1,670
Platte	1,386	60.63%	900	39.37%	2,286
Polk	636	69.97%	273	30.03%	909
Pulaski	325	79.08%	86	20.92%	411
Ralls	322	43.28%	422	56.72%	744
Randolph	571	48.93%	596	51.07%	1,167
Ray	734	55.06%	599	44.94%	1,333
Ripley	266	89.56%	31	10.44%	297
Saline	446	43.01%	591	56.99%	1,037
Scotland	442	58.23%	317	41.77%	759
Scott	480	65.04%	258	34.96%	738
Shannon	271	82.62%	57	17.38%	328
Shelby	209	46.14%	244	53.86%	453
St. Charles	503	51.17%	480	48.83%	983
St. Clair	342	65.90%	177	34.10%	519
St. Francois	234	43.74%	301	56.26%	535
St. Louis	3,329	47.44%	3,688	52.56%	7,017
Ste. Genevieve	245	55.94%	193	44.06%	438
Stoddard	323	73.74%	115	26.26%	438
Taney	297	89.19%	36	10.81%	333
Van Buren	443	63.29%	257	36.71%	700
Warren	341	48.37%	364	51.63%	705
Washington	588	48.96%	613	51.04%	1,201
Wayne	366	80.97%	86	19.03%	452
Wright	486	83.36%	97	16.64%	583
Totals	41,324	56.94%	31,250	43.06%	72,574

== See also ==
- United States presidential elections in Missouri
