= 1852 United States presidential election in Missouri =

- November 2, 1852

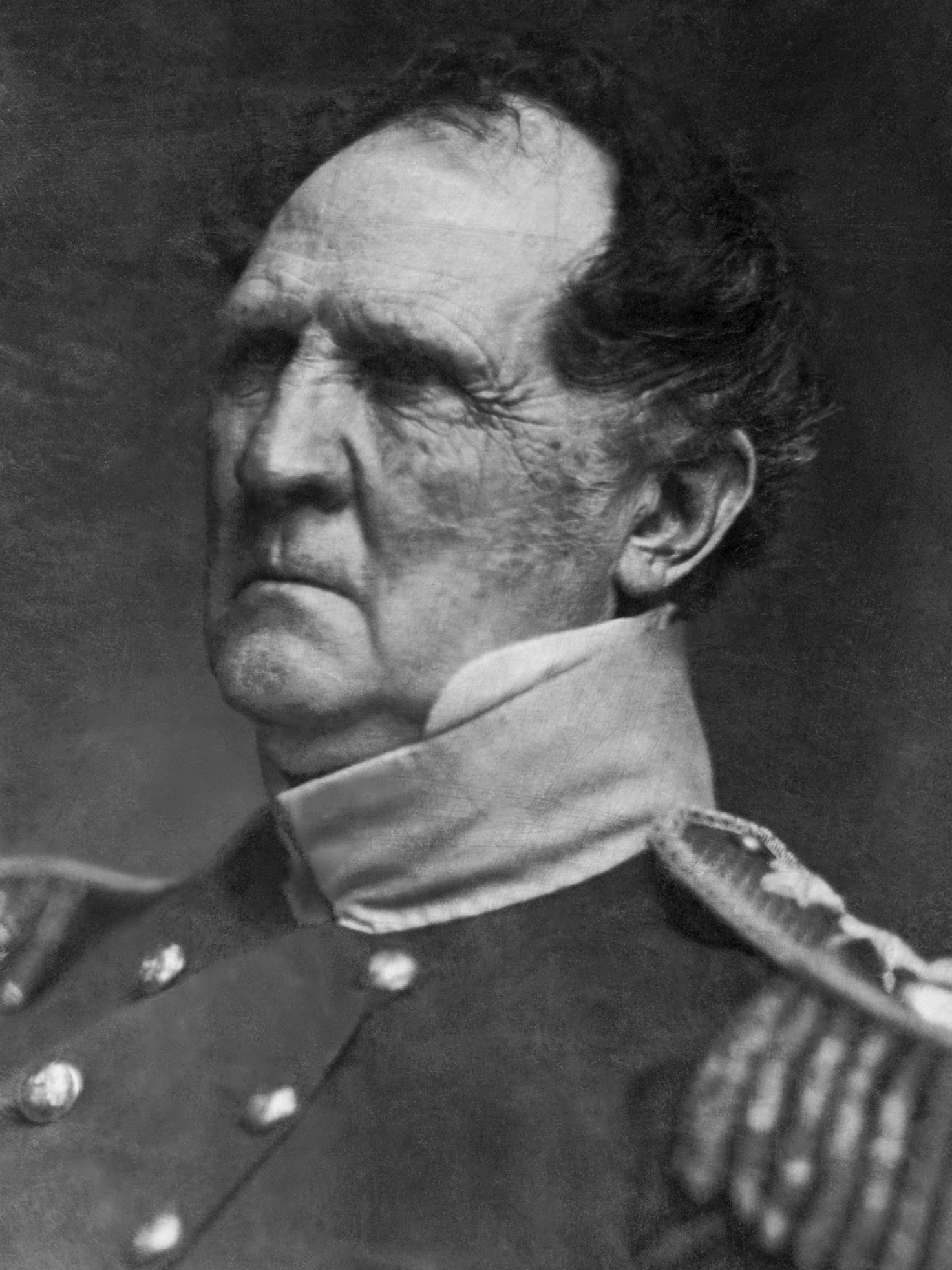
Nominee	Franklin Pierce	Winfield Scott
Party	Democratic	Whig
Home state	New Hampshire	New Jersey
Running mate	William R. King	William Alexander Graham
Electoral vote	9	0
Popular vote	38,817	29,984
Percentage	56.42%	43.58%
County results
Pierce
50–60%
60–70%
70–80%
80–90%
90–100%
Scott
50–60%
60–70%
70–80%
Tie
50%
No data/vote
President before election
Millard Fillmore
Whig
Elected President
Franklin Pierce
Democratic

The 1852 United States presidential election in Missouri took place on November 2, 1852, as part of the 1852 United States presidential election. Voters chose nine representatives, or electors, to the Electoral College, who voted for president and vice president.

Missouri voted for the Democratic candidate, Franklin Pierce, over Whig candidate Winfield Scott. Pierce won Missouri by a margin of 12.84%.

== Results ==
1852 United States presidential election in Missouri
Party	Candidate	Votes	%
Democratic	Franklin Pierce	38,817	56.42%
Whig	Winfield Scott	29,984	43.58%
Total votes		68,801	100%

=== Results by county ===
1852 United States presidential election in Missouri (by county) (Note: No legal election was held in Dunklin county.) (Note: No returns were located for this election for Shannon county.)
County	Franklin Pierce Democratic		Winfield Scott Whig		Total votes cast
County	#	%	#	%	Total votes cast
Adair	201	64.01%	113	35.99%	314
Andrew	784	62.72%	466	37.28%	1,250
Atchison	150	58.59%	106	41.41%	256
Audrain	160	43.24%	210	56.76%	370
Barry	253	77.85%	72	22.15%	325
Bates	116	52.73%	104	47.27%	220
Benton	328	66.26%	167	33.74%	495
Bollinger	112	80.00%	28	20.00%	140
Boone	613	35.54%	1,112	64.46%	1,725
Buchanan	857	54.62%	712	45.38%	1,569
Butler	26	61.90%	16	38.10%	42
Caldwell	209	57.10%	157	42.90%	366
Callaway	595	49.75%	601	50.25%	1,196
Camden	109	61.93%	67	38.07%	176
Cape Girardeau	487	59.75%	328	40.25%	815
Carroll	286	54.48%	239	45.52%	525
Cass	237	50.97%	228	49.03%	465
Cedar	162	71.37%	65	28.63%	227
Chariton	498	58.87%	348	41.13%	846
Clark	289	47.07%	325	52.93%	614
Clay	406	39.34%	626	60.66%	1,032
Clinton	290	50.61%	283	49.39%	573
Cole	463	68.19%	216	31.81%	679
Cooper	535	45.34%	645	54.66%	1,180
Crawford	278	53.67%	240	46.33%	518
Dade	276	61.20%	175	38.80%	451
Dallas	344	77.13%	102	22.87%	446
Daviess	351	54.25%	296	45.75%	647
DeKalb	167	71.67%	66	28.33%	233
Dent	69	54.33%	58	45.67%	127
Dodge	55	63.95%	31	36.05%	86
Franklin	619	69.08%	277	30.92%	896
Gasconade	304	77.35%	89	22.65%	393
Gentry	233	63.66%	133	36.34%	366
Greene	921	65.50%	485	34.50%	1,406
Grundy	184	46.12%	215	53.88%	399
Harrison	164	59.64%	111	40.36%	275
Henry	245	47.95%	266	52.05%	511
Hickory	194	72.12%	75	27.88%	269
Holt	291	60.62%	189	39.38%	480
Howard	762	53.03%	675	46.97%	1,437
Jackson	858	54.10%	728	45.90%	1,586
Jasper	355	67.75%	169	32.25%	524
Jefferson	210	54.97%	172	45.03%	382
Johnson	456	55.88%	360	44.12%	816
Knox	255	54.84%	210	45.16%	465
Laclede	184	71.88%	72	28.13%	256
Lafayette	532	39.85%	803	60.15%	1,335
Lawrence	390	70.65%	162	29.35%	552
Lewis	408	50.62%	398	49.38%	806
Lincoln	587	57.16%	440	42.84%	1,027
Linn	282	53.11%	249	46.89%	531
Livingston	321	56.12%	251	43.88%	572
Macon	473	57.13%	355	42.87%	828
Madison	259	68.88%	117	31.12%	376
Marion	751	45.65%	894	54.35%	1,645
McDonald	194	75.49%	63	24.51%	257
Mercer	186	50.00%	186	50.00%	372
Miller	279	81.82%	62	18.18%	341
Mississippi	168	58.95%	117	41.05%	285
Moniteau	453	70.56%	189	29.44%	642
Monroe	611	44.57%	760	55.43%	1,371
Montgomery	266	40.80%	386	59.20%	652
Morgan	290	68.72%	132	31.28%	422
New Madrid	32	25.60%	93	74.40%	125
Newton	323	75.12%	107	24.88%	430
Nodaway	111	64.53%	61	35.47%	172
Oregon	95	89.62%	11	10.38%	106
Osage	372	72.23%	143	27.77%	515
Ozark	58	64.44%	32	35.56%	90
Pemiscot	34	37.36%	57	62.64%	91
Perry	213	55.47%	171	44.53%	384
Pettis	301	55.13%	245	44.87%	546
Pike	758	48.56%	803	51.44%	1,561
Platte	1,060	53.67%	915	46.33%	1,975
Polk	504	65.97%	260	34.03%	764
Pulaski	169	81.25%	39	18.75%	208
Putnam	121	53.78%	104	46.22%	225
Ralls	278	44.91%	341	55.09%	619
Randolph	502	51.33%	476	48.67%	978
Ray	618	56.13%	483	43.87%	1,101
Reynolds	98	95.15%	5	4.85%	103
Ripley	83	83.84%	16	16.17%	99
Saline	443	46.29%	514	53.71%	957
Schuyler	222	55.64%	177	44.36%	399
Scotland	283	56.71%	216	43.29%	499
Scott	97	62.18%	59	37.82%	156
Shelby	328	61.54%	205	38.46%	533
St. Charles	595	61.15%	378	38.85%	973
St. Clair	225	60.16%	149	39.84%	374
St. Francois	328	56.75%	250	43.25%	578
St. Louis	5,826	57.55%	4,298	42.45%	10,124
Ste. Genevieve	165	57.49%	122	42.51%	287
Stoddard	177	60.41%	116	39.59%	293
Stone	94	84.68%	17	15.32%	111
Sullivan	274	68.33%	127	31.67%	401
Taney	168	93.85%	11	6.15%	179
Texas	167	63.74%	95	36.26%	262
Vernon	153	70.83%	63	29.17%	216
Warren	301	50.00%	301	50.00%	602
Washington	334	48.13%	360	51.87%	694
Wayne	144	78.26%	40	21.74%	184
Wright	165	63.46%	95	36.54%	260
Totals	38,610	56.32%	29,947	43.68%	68,557

== See also ==
- United States presidential elections in Missouri
