= United States presidential elections in Missouri =

Presidential elections in Missouri
- Number of elections: 52
- Voted Democratic: 30
- Voted Republican: 20
- Voted Democratic-Republican: 2
- Voted other: 0
- Voted for winning candidate: 38
- Voted for losing candidate: 14

The tables below list the United States presidential elections in Missouri, ordered by year. Since 1904, Missouri has voted for the eventual winner of the presidential election with only four exceptions: 1956, 2008, 2012, and 2020, although the popular vote winner failed to win the electoral vote in 2000 and 2016. Missouri was historically viewed as a bellwether state, but the consecutive votes against the winning candidate in 2008 and 2012 introduced doubts about its continued status as a bellwether, and an 18.5-point Republican victory in 2016 indicated that it had become a safe red state.

Winners of the state are in bold. The shading refers to the state winner, and not the national winner.

== Elections from 1864 to present ==
View source data.

| Year | Winner (nationally) | Votes | Percent | Runner-up (nationally) | Votes | Percent | Other national candidates (Note: For purposes of these lists, other national candidates are defined as those who won at least one electoral vote, or won at least ten percent of the vote in multiple states.) | Votes | Percent | Electoral votes | Notes |
|---|---|---|---|---|---|---|---|---|---|---|---|
| 2024 | **Donald Trump** | 1,751,986 | 58.49 | Kamala Harris | 1,200,599 | 40.08 | — | | | 10 | |
| 2020 | Joe Biden | 1,253,014 | 41.41 | **Donald Trump** | 1,718,736 | 56.80 | — | | | 10 | |
| 2016 | **Donald Trump** (Note: Won the electoral college while losing the popular vote) | 1,594,511 | 56.38 | Hillary Clinton | 1,071,068 | 37.87 | - | | | 10 | |
| 2012 | Barack Obama | 1,223,796 | 44.38 | **Mitt Romney** | 1,482,440 | 53.76 | - | | | 10 | |
| 2008 | Barack Obama | 1,441,911 | 49.29 | **John McCain** | 1,445,814 | 49.43 | - | | | 11 | |
| 2004 | **George W. Bush** | 1,455,713 | 53.30 | John Kerry | 1,259,171 | 46.1 | - | | | 11 | |
| 2000 | **George W. Bush** | 1,189,924 | 50.42 | Al Gore | 1,111,138 | 47.08 | - | | | 11 | |
| 1996 | **Bill Clinton** | 1,025,935 | 47.54 | Bob Dole | 890,016 | 41.24 | Ross Perot | 217,188 | 10.06 | 11 | |
| 1992 | **Bill Clinton** | 1,053,873 | 44.07 | George H. W. Bush | 811,159 | 33.92 | Ross Perot | 518,741 | 21.69 | 11 | |
| 1988 | **George H. W. Bush** | 1,084,953 | 51.83 | Michael Dukakis | 1,001,619 | 47.85 | - | | | 11 | |
| 1984 | **Ronald Reagan** | 1,274,188 | 60.02 | Walter Mondale | 848,583 | 39.98 | - | | | 11 | |
| 1980 | **Ronald Reagan** | 1,074,181 | 51.16 | Jimmy Carter | 931,182 | 44.35 | John B. Anderson | 77,920 | 3.71 | 12 | |
| 1976 | **Jimmy Carter** | 998,387 | 51.1 | Gerald Ford | 927,443 | 47.47 | - | | | 12 | |
| 1972 | **Richard Nixon** | 1,154,058 | 62.29 | George McGovern | 698,531 | 37.71 | - | | | 12 | |
| 1968 | **Richard Nixon** | 811,932 | 44.87 | Hubert Humphrey | 791,444 | 43.74 | George Wallace | 206,126 | 11.39 | 12 | |
| 1964 | **Lyndon B. Johnson** | 1,164,344 | 64.05 | Barry Goldwater | 653,535 | 35.95 | - | | | 12 | |
| 1960 | **John F. Kennedy** | 972,201 | 50.26 | Richard Nixon | 962,221 | 49.74 | - | | | 13 | |
| 1956 | Dwight D. Eisenhower | 914,289 | 49.89 | **Adlai Stevenson II** | 918,273 | 50.11 | T. Coleman Andrews/ Unpledged Electors (Note: Was allied with a slate of unpledged electors in Louisiana, Mississippi and South Carolina) | - | | 13 | |
| 1952 | **Dwight D. Eisenhower** | 959,429 | 50.71 | Adlai Stevenson II | 929,830 | 49.14 | - | | | 13 | |
| 1948 | **Harry S. Truman** | 917,315 | 58.11 | Thomas E. Dewey | 655,039 | 41.49 | Strom Thurmond | 42 | 0.003 | 15 | |
| 1944 | **Franklin D. Roosevelt** | 807,804 | 51.37 | Thomas E. Dewey | 761,524 | 48.43 | - | | | 15 | |
| 1940 | **Franklin D. Roosevelt** | 958,476 | 52.27 | Wendell Willkie | 871,009 | 47.5 | - | | | 15 | |
| 1936 | **Franklin D. Roosevelt** | 1,111,043 | 60.76 | Alf Landon | 697,891 | 38.16 | - | | | 15 | |
| 1932 | **Franklin D. Roosevelt** | 1,025,406 | 63.69 | Herbert Hoover | 564,713 | 35.08 | - | | | 15 | |
| 1928 | **Herbert Hoover** | 834,080 | 55.58 | Al Smith | 662,562 | 44.15 | - | | | 18 | |
| 1924 | **Calvin Coolidge** | 648,486 | 49.58 | John W. Davis | 572,753 | 43.79 | Robert M. La Follette | 84,160 | 6.43 | 18 | |
| 1920 | **Warren G. Harding** | 727,162 | 54.56 | James M. Cox | 574,799 | 43.13 | Parley P. Christensen | 3,291 | 0.25 | 18 | |
| 1916 | **Woodrow Wilson** | 398,032 | 50.59 | Charles E. Hughes | 369,339 | 46.94 | - | | | 18 | |
| 1912 | **Woodrow Wilson** | 330,746 | 47.35 | Theodore Roosevelt | 124,375 | 17.8 | William H. Taft | 207,821 | 29.75 | 18 | |
| 1908 | **William H. Taft** | 347,203 | 48.5 | William Jennings Bryan | 346,574 | 48.41 | - | | | 18 | |
| 1904 | **Theodore Roosevelt** | 321,449 | 49.93 | Alton B. Parker | 296,312 | 46.02 | - | | | 18 | |
| 1900 | William McKinley | 314,092 | 45.94 | **William Jennings Bryan** | 351,922 | 51.48 | - | | | 17 | |
| 1896 | William McKinley | 304,940 | 45.25 | **William Jennings Bryan** | 363,667 | 53.96 | - | | | 17 | |
| 1892 | **Grover Cleveland** | 268,400 | 49.56 | Benjamin Harrison | 227,646 | 42.03 | James B. Weaver | 41,204 | 7.61 | 17 | |
| 1888 | Benjamin Harrison | 236,252 | 45.31 | **Grover Cleveland** | 261,943 | 50.24 | - | | | 16 | |
| 1884 | **Grover Cleveland** | 236,023 | 53.49 | James G. Blaine | 203,081 | 46.02 | - | | | 16 | |
| 1880 | James A. Garfield | 153,647 | 38.67 | **Winfield S. Hancock** | 208,600 | 52.51 | James B. Weaver | 35,042 | 8.82 | 15 | |
| 1876 | Rutherford B. Hayes | 145,027 | 41.36 | **Samuel J. Tilden** | 202,086 | 57.64 | - | | | 15 | |
| 1872 | Ulysses S. Grant | 119,196 | 43.65 | **Horace Greeley** | 151,434 | 55.46 | - | | | 15 | |
| 1868 | **Ulysses S. Grant** | 86,860 | 57 | Horatio Seymour | 65,628 | 43 | - | | | 11 | |
| 1864 | **Abraham Lincoln** | 72,750 | 69.7 | George B. McClellan | 31,596 | 30.3 | - | | | 11 | |

== Election of 1860 ==
The election of 1860 was a complex realigning election in which the breakdown of the previous two-party alignment culminated in four parties each competing for influence in different parts of the country. The result of the election, with the victory of an ardent opponent of slavery, spurred the secession of eleven states and brought about the American Civil War.

| Year | Winner (nationally) | Votes | Percent | Runner-up (nationally) | Votes | Percent | Runner-up (nationally) | Votes | Percent | Runner-up (nationally) | Votes | Percent | Electoral votes |
|---|---|---|---|---|---|---|---|---|---|---|---|---|---|
| 1860 | Abraham Lincoln | 17,028 | 10.3 | **Stephen A. Douglas** | 58,801 | 35.5 | John C. Breckinridge | 31,362 | 18.9 | John Bell | 58,372 | 35.3 | 9 |

== Elections from 1828 to 1856 ==
| Year | Winner (nationally) | Votes | Percent | Runner-up (nationally) | Votes | Percent | Other national candidates | Votes | Percent | Electoral votes | Notes |
|---|---|---|---|---|---|---|---|---|---|---|---|
| 1856 | **James Buchanan** | 57,964 | 54.43 | John C. Frémont | no ballots | | Millard Fillmore | 48,522 | 45.57 | 9 | |
| 1852 | **Franklin Pierce** | 38,817 | 56.42 | Winfield Scott | 29,984 | 43.58 | John P. Hale | no ballots | | 9 | |
| 1848 | Zachary Taylor | 32,671 | 44.91 | **Lewis Cass** | 40,077 | 55.09 | Martin Van Buren | no ballots | | 7 | |
| 1844 | **James K. Polk** | 41,322 | 56.98 | Henry Clay | 31,200 | 43.02 | - | | | 7 | |
| 1840 | William Henry Harrison | 22,954 | 43.37 | **Martin Van Buren** | 29,969 | 56.63 | - | | | 4 | |
| 1836 | **Martin Van Buren** | 10,995 | 59.98 | Hugh Lawson White | 7,337 | 40.02 | various (Note: Three other candidates ran and received electoral votes nationally as part of the unsuccessful Whig strategy to defeat Martin Van Buren by running four candidates with local appeal in different regions of the country. The others were William Henry Harrison, Daniel Webster, and Willie Person Mangum. None of these candidates appeared on the ballot in Missouri.) | no ballots | - | 4 | |
| 1832 | **Andrew Jackson** | 5,192 | 100 | Henry Clay | no ballots | | William Wirt | no ballots | | 4 | |
| 1828 | **Andrew Jackson** | 8,232 | 70.64 | John Quincy Adams | 3,422 | 29.36 | - | | | 3 | |

== Election of 1824 ==
The election of 1824 was a complex realigning election following the collapse of the prevailing Democratic-Republican Party, resulting in four different candidates each claiming to carry the banner of the party, and competing for influence in different parts of the country. The election was the only one in history to be decided by the House of Representatives under the provisions of the Twelfth Amendment to the United States Constitution after no candidate secured a majority of the electoral vote. It was also the only presidential election in which the candidate who received a plurality of electoral votes (Andrew Jackson) did not become president, a source of great bitterness for Jackson and his supporters, who proclaimed the election of Adams a corrupt bargain.

| Year | Winner (nationally) | Votes | Percent | Runner-up (nationally) | Votes | Percent | Runner-up (nationally) | Votes | Percent | Runner-up (nationally) | Votes | Percent | Electoral votes |
|---|---|---|---|---|---|---|---|---|---|---|---|---|---|
| 1824 | Andrew Jackson | 1,166 | 33.97 | John Quincy Adams | 159 | 4.63 | **Henry Clay** | 2,042 | 59.50 | William H. Crawford | 32 | 0.93 | 3 |

== Election of 1820 ==
In the election of 1820, incumbent President James Monroe ran effectively unopposed, winning all electoral votes except one vote in New Hampshire. The popular vote was primarily directed to filling the office of vice president.

Missouri's participation in the election was a point of political dispute. On March 9, 1820, Congress had passed a law directing Missouri to hold a convention to form a constitution and a state government. This law stated that "the said state, when formed, shall be admitted into the Union, upon an equal footing with the original states, in all respects whatsoever." However, when Congress reconvened in November 1820, the admission of Missouri became an issue of contention. Proponents claimed that Missouri had fulfilled the conditions of the law and therefore was a state; detractors contended that certain provisions of the Missouri Constitution violated the United States Constitution.

By the time Congress was due to meet to count the electoral votes from the election, this dispute had lasted over two months. The counting raised a ticklish problem: if Congress counted Missouri's votes, that would count as recognition that Missouri was a state; on the other hand, if Congress failed to count Missouri's vote, it would count as recognition that Missouri was not a state. Knowing ahead of time that Monroe had won in a landslide and that Missouri's vote would therefore make no difference in the final result, the Senate passed a resolution on February 13, 1821, stating that if a protest were made, there would be no consideration of the matter unless the vote of Missouri would change who would become president. Instead, the President of the Senate would announce the final tally twice, once with Missouri included and once with it excluded.

The next day this resolution was introduced in the full House. After a lively debate, it was passed. Nonetheless, during the counting of the electoral votes on February 14, 1821, an objection was raised to the votes from Missouri by Representative Arthur Livermore of New Hampshire. He argued that since Missouri had not yet officially become a state, it had no right to cast any electoral votes. Immediately, Representative John Floyd of Virginia argued that Missouri's votes must be counted. Chaos ensued, and order was restored only with the counting of the vote as per the resolution and then adjournment for the day.

== Popular candidates ==
Excluding two-campaign two-term presidents, including candidates who eventually lost

- Franklin Roosevelt - 4 times (4 terms)
- Donald Trump - 3 times (2 terms)
- Grover Cleveland - 3 times (2 terms)
- Martin Van Buren - 2 times (1 term)
- William Jennings Bryan - 2 times (0 terms)

== See also ==
- Elections in Missouri
