= 1848 United States presidential election in Missouri =

- November 7, 1848
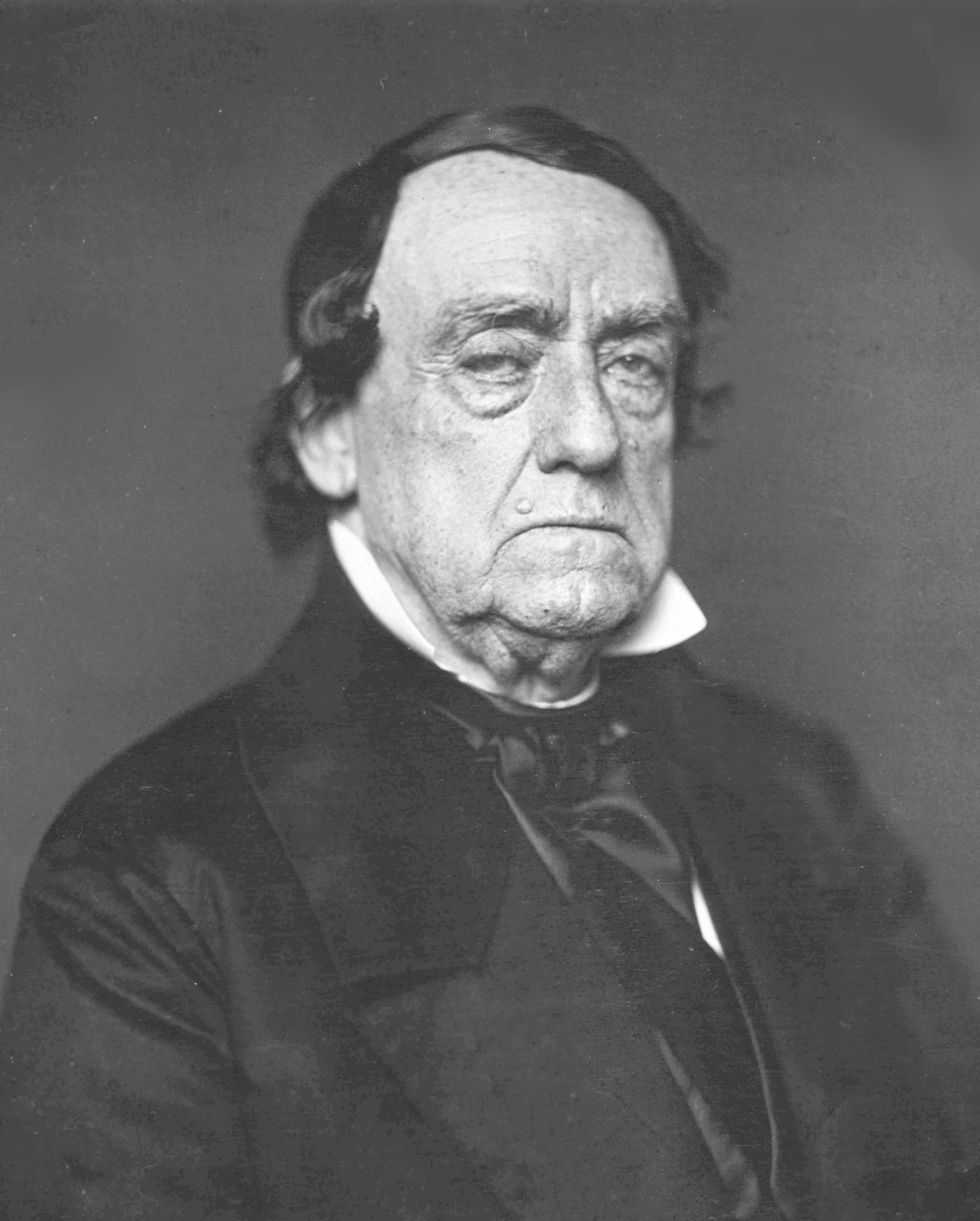

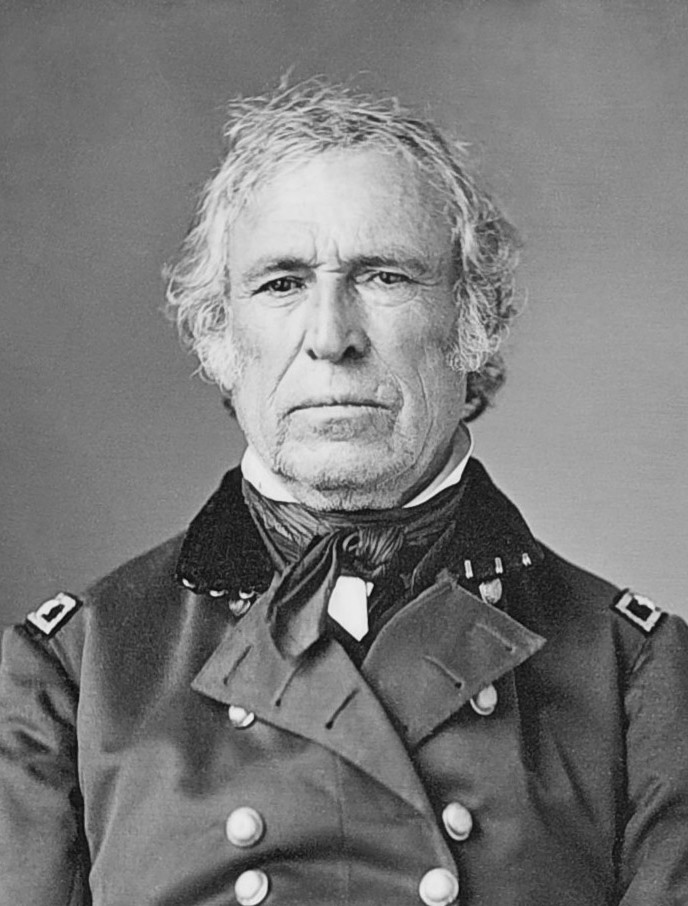
Nominee	Lewis Cass	Zachary Taylor
Party	Democratic	Whig
Home state	Michigan	Louisiana
Running mate	William O. Butler	Millard Fillmore
Electoral vote	7	0
Popular vote	40,077	32,671
Percentage	55.09%	44.91%
County results
Cass
50–60%
60–70%
70–80%
80–90%
90–100%
Taylor
50–60%
60–70%
Tie
50%
No data/vote
President before election
James K. Polk
Democratic
Elected President
Zachary Taylor
Whig

The 1848 United States presidential election in Missouri took place on November 7, as part of the 1848 United States presidential election. Voters chose seven representatives, or electors, to the Electoral College, who voted for president and vice president.

Missouri voted for the Democratic candidate, Lewis Cass, over Whig candidate Zachary Taylor. Cass won Missouri by a margin of 10.18%.

== Results ==
1848 United States presidential election in Missouri
Party	Candidate	Votes	%
Democratic	Lewis Cass	40,077	55.09%
Whig	Zachary Taylor	32,671	44.91%
Total votes		72,748	100%

=== Results by county ===
1848 United States presidential election in Missouri (by county)
County	Lewis Cass Democratic		Zachary Taylor Whig		Total votes cast
County	#	%	#	%	Total votes cast
Adair	200	64.52%	110	35.48%	310
Andrew	689	64.21%	384	35.79%	1,073
Atchison	136	63.85%	77	36.15%	213
Audrain	166	47.29%	185	52.71%	351
Barry	217	79.78%	55	20.22%	272
Bates	186	56.02%	146	43.98%	332
Benton	382	64.75%	208	35.25%	590
Boone	588	34.79%	1,102	65.21%	1,690
Buchanan	1,061	60.11%	704	39.89%	1,765
Caldwell	168	56.76%	128	43.24%	296
Callaway	631	42.64%	849	57.36%	1,480
Camden	282	64.53%	155	35.47%	437
Cape Girardeau	709	59.38%	485	40.62%	1,194
Carroll	298	52.84%	266	47.16%	564
Cedar	271	70.03%	116	29.97%	387
Chariton	577	58.22%	414	41.78%	991
Clark	242	46.01%	284	53.99%	526
Clay	418	40.04%	626	59.96%	1,044
Clinton	285	49.57%	290	50.43%	575
Cole	531	65.72%	277	34.28%	808
Cooper	633	43.78%	813	56.22%	1,446
Crawford	275	51.02%	264	48.98%	539
Dade	306	64.83%	166	35.17%	472
Dallas	283	72.94%	105	27.06%	388
Daviess	358	57.10%	269	42.90%	627
DeKalb	146	79.78%	37	20.22%	183
Dunklin	42	50.00%	42	50.00%	84
Franklin	680	66.73%	339	33.27%	1,019
Gasconade	349	80.05%	87	19.95%	436
Gentry	396	72.26%	152	27.74%	548
Greene	825	67.29%	401	32.71%	1,226
Grundy	187	45.39%	225	54.61%	412
Harrison	144	69.57%	63	30.43%	207
Henry	239	46.59%	274	53.41%	513
Hickory	224	69.57%	98	30.43%	322
Holt	248	62.63%	148	37.37%	396
Howard	888	52.58%	801	47.42%	1,689
Jackson	954	57.85%	695	42.15%	1,649
Jasper	294	64.62%	161	35.38%	455
Jefferson	311	55.83%	246	44.17%	557
Johnson	451	57.45%	334	42.55%	785
Knox	197	50.13%	196	49.87%	393
Lafayette	585	39.00%	915	61.00%	1,500
Lawrence	374	68.75%	170	31.25%	544
Lewis	479	50.00%	479	50.00%	958
Lincoln	696	55.59%	556	44.41%	1,252
Linn	297	56.36%	230	43.64%	527
Livingston	373	65.67%	195	34.33%	568
Macon	470	56.63%	360	43.37%	830
Madison	377	62.01%	231	37.99%	608
Marion	797	43.24%	1,046	56.76%	1,843
Mercer	183	55.96%	144	44.04%	327
Miller	373	83.07%	76	16.93%	449
Mississippi	181	56.74%	138	43.26%	319
Moniteau	466	74.32%	161	25.68%	627
Monroe	561	41.01%	807	58.99%	1,368
Montgomery	186	32.92%	379	67.08%	565
Morgan	342	67.19%	167	32.81%	509
New Madrid	168	34.22%	323	65.78%	491
Newton	461	74.12%	161	25.88%	622
Nodaway	148	77.49%	43	22.51%	191
Oregon	111	94.07%	7	5.93%	118
Osage	312	77.23%	92	22.77%	404
Ozark	113	74.34%	39	25.66%	152
Perry	389	54.71%	322	45.29%	711
Pettis	265	53.54%	230	46.46%	495
Pike	784	49.71%	793	50.29%	1,577
Platte	1,494	57.55%	1,102	42.45%	2,596
Polk	516	69.08%	231	30.92%	747
Pulaski	241	66.03%	124	33.97%	365
Putnam	120	61.86%	74	38.14%	194
Ralls	299	42.96%	397	57.04%	696
Randolph	508	45.56%	607	54.44%	1,115
Ray	626	55.15%	509	44.85%	1,135
Reynolds	148	87.57%	21	12.43%	169
Ripley	154	91.67%	14	8.33%	168
Saline	438	44.97%	536	55.03%	974
Schuyler	192	48.48%	204	51.52%	396
Scotland	240	64.69%	131	35.31%	371
Scott	217	59.62%	147	40.38%	364
Shannon	54	60.67%	35	39.33%	89
Shelby	263	60.05%	175	39.95%	438
St. Charles	569	54.40%	477	45.60%	1,046
St. Clair	263	63.99%	148	36.01%	411
St. Francois	274	49.02%	285	50.98%	559
St. Louis	4,778	49.74%	4,827	50.26%	9,605
Ste. Genevieve	168	54.19%	142	45.81%	310
Stoddard	196	66.89%	97	33.11%	293
Sullivan	250	61.88%	154	38.12%	404
Taney	325	85.75%	54	14.25%	379
Texas	185	69.55%	81	30.45%	266
Van Buren	420	60.87%	270	39.13%	690
Warren	336	48.91%	351	51.09%	687
Washington	423	47.21%	473	52.79%	896
Wayne	245	72.92%	91	27.08%	336
Wright	181	71.54%	72	28.46%	253
Totals	40,082	55.09%	32,670	44.91%	72,752

== See also ==
- United States presidential elections in Missouri
