= 1832 United States presidential election in Missouri =

- November 2 – December 5, 1832
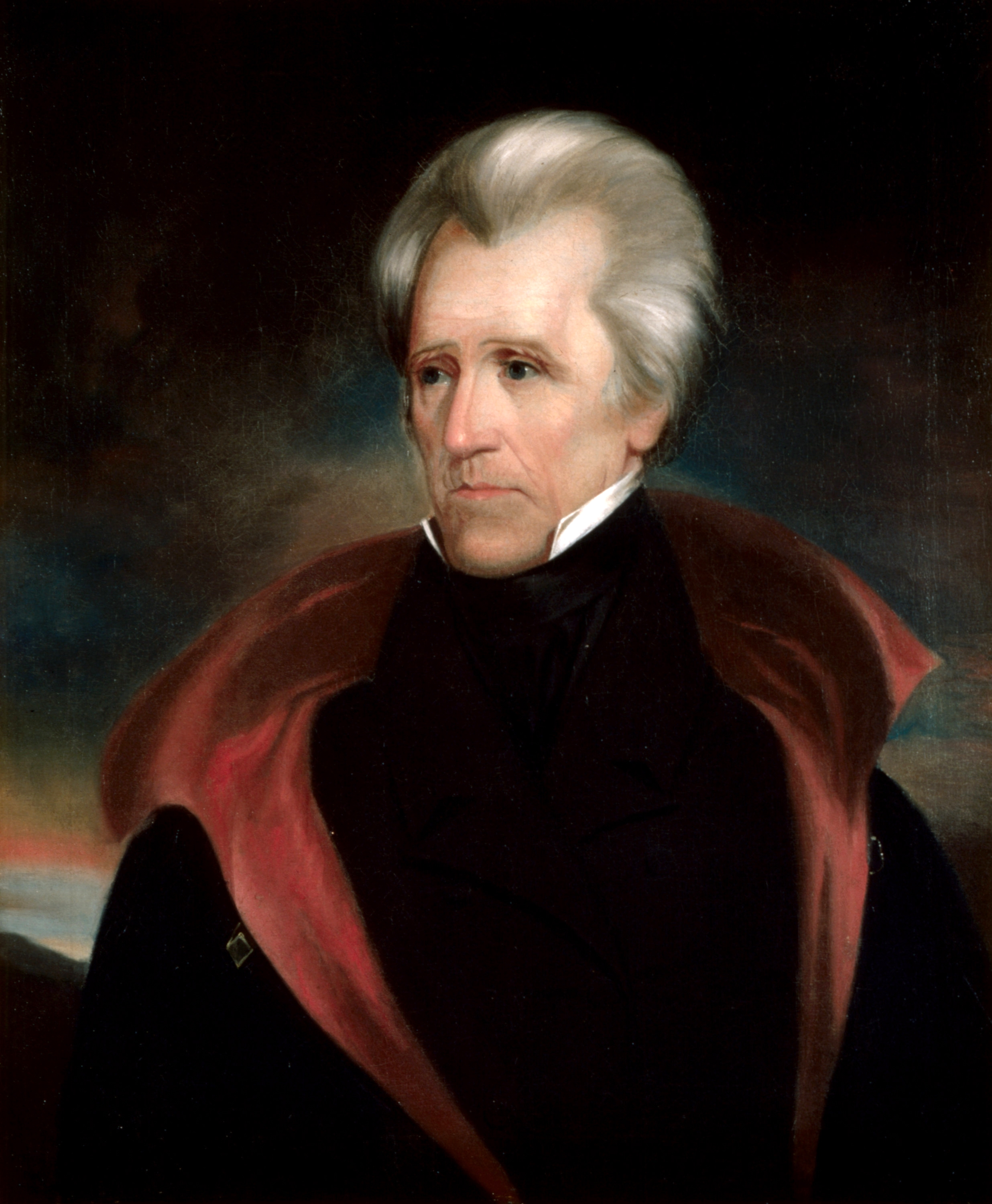

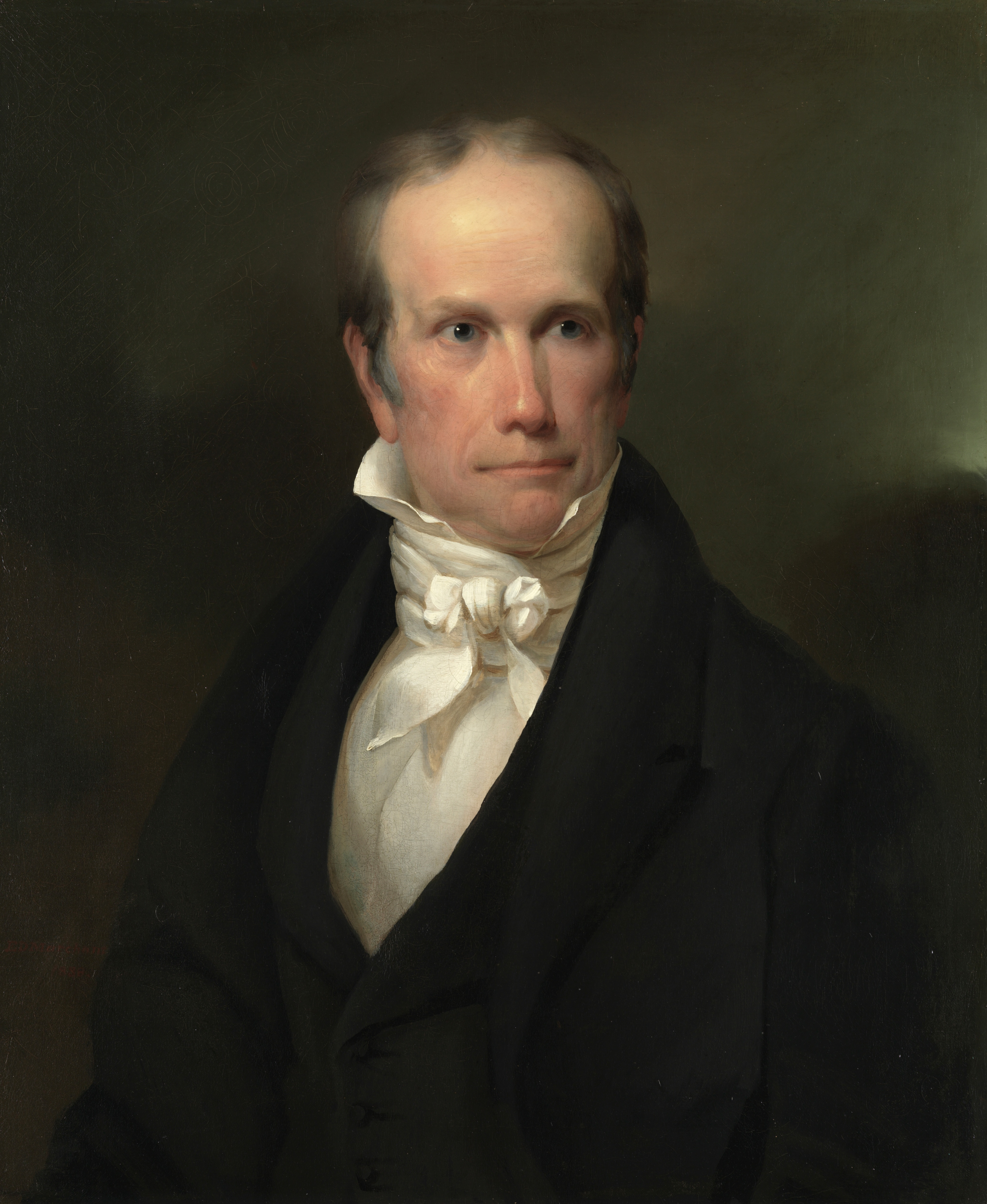
Nominee	Andrew Jackson	Henry Clay
Party	Democratic	National Republican
Home state	Tennessee	Kentucky
Running mate	Martin Van Buren	John Sergeant
Electoral vote	4	0
Popular vote	8,904	4,760
Percentage	65.16%	34.84%
County results
Jackson
40–50%
70–80%
80–90%
90–100%
Clay
50–60%
60–70%
No Data/Vote

The 1832 United States presidential election in Missouri took place between November 2 and December 5, 1832, as part of the 1832 United States presidential election. Voters chose four representatives, or electors to the Electoral College, who voted for President and Vice President.

Missouri voted for the Democratic Party nominee, Andrew Jackson, over the National Republican nominee, Henry Clay. Jackson won Missouri by a margin of 30.33%. It is frequently reported that Jackson's popular vote win was unanimous, having received 5,159 or 5,192 votes. However, this was likely a reference to Jackson's plurality over Clay that was confounded with his total vote.

== Results ==
1832 United States presidential election in Missouri
Party	Candidate	Votes	Percentage	Electoral votes
Democratic	Andrew Jackson (incumbent)	8,904	65.16%	4
National Republican	Henry Clay	4,760	34.84%	0
Totals		13,664	100.0%	4

== See also ==
- United States presidential elections in Missouri
