= 1864 United States presidential election in Missouri =

- November 8, 1864
- Turnout: 8.83% of the total population ▼5.18 pp

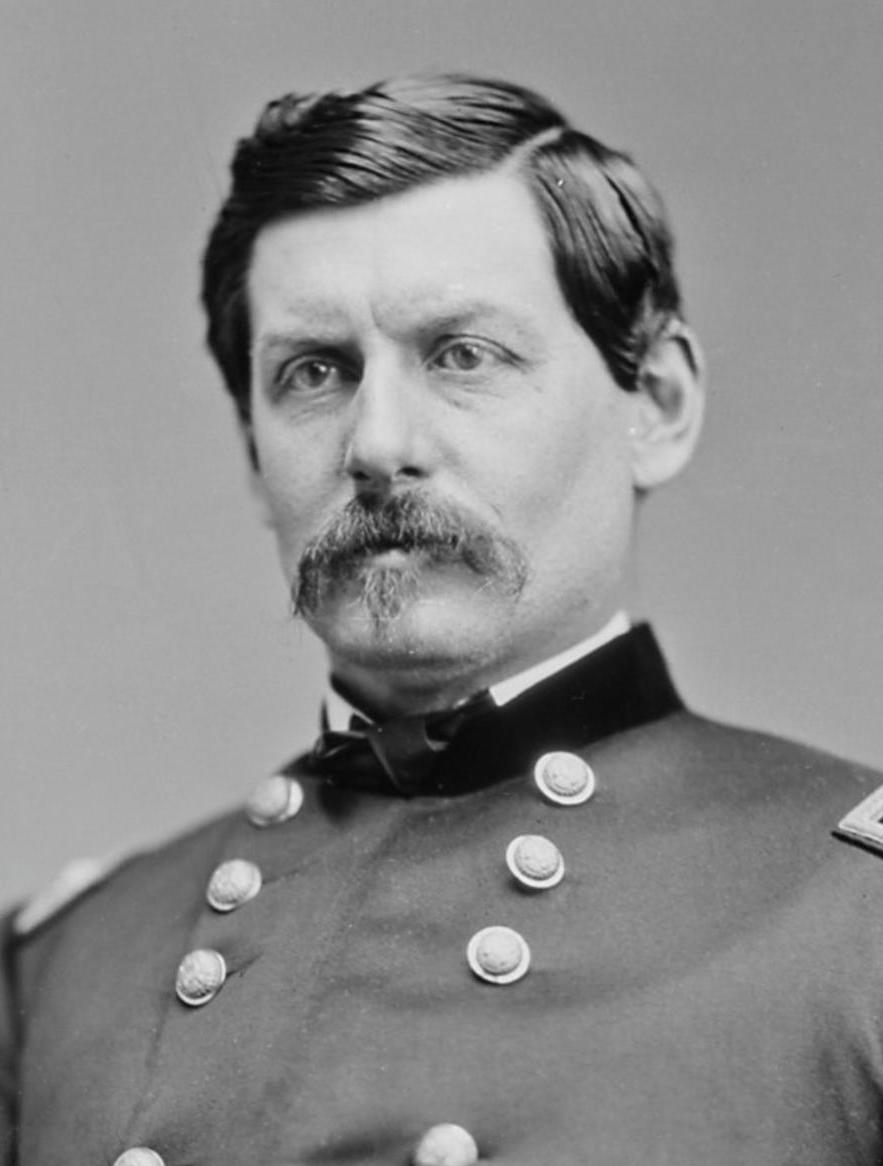
| Nominee | Abraham Lincoln | George B. McClellan |
| Party | National Union | Democratic |
| Home state | Illinois | New Jersey |
| Running mate | Andrew Johnson | George H. Pendleton |
| Electoral vote | 11 | 0 |
| Popular vote | 72,750 | 31,596 |
| Percentage | 69.72% | 30.28% |
County results
Lincoln
50–60%
60–70%
70–80%
80–90%
90–100%
McClellan
50–60%
60–70%
70–80%
President before election
Abraham Lincoln
Republican
Elected President
Abraham Lincoln
National Union

The 1864 United States presidential election in Missouri took place on November 8, 1864, as part of the 1864 United States presidential election. Voters chose 11 representatives, or electors, to the Electoral College, who voted for president and vice president.

Missouri was won by the National Union candidate, incumbent Republican President Abraham Lincoln of Illinois and his running mate former Senator and Military Governor of Tennessee Andrew Johnson. They defeated the Democratic candidate, 4th Commanding General of the United States Army George B. McClellan of New Jersey and his running mate Representative George H. Pendleton of Ohio. Lincoln won the state by a margin of 39.44%.

Despite the fact that slavery and state's rights were popular in Missouri, the state gave Lincoln his fourth best result for popular vote percentage points after neighboring Kansas, Vermont and Massachusetts. The state was also his tenth highest for total votes. This is likely because the vast majority of Confederates would not have participated in the election, as the Civil War was ongoing. The 104,346 votes cast in this election were a drop off of nearly 60,000 from 1860, and would rebound by roughly 50,000 in 1868, after the conclusion of the war.

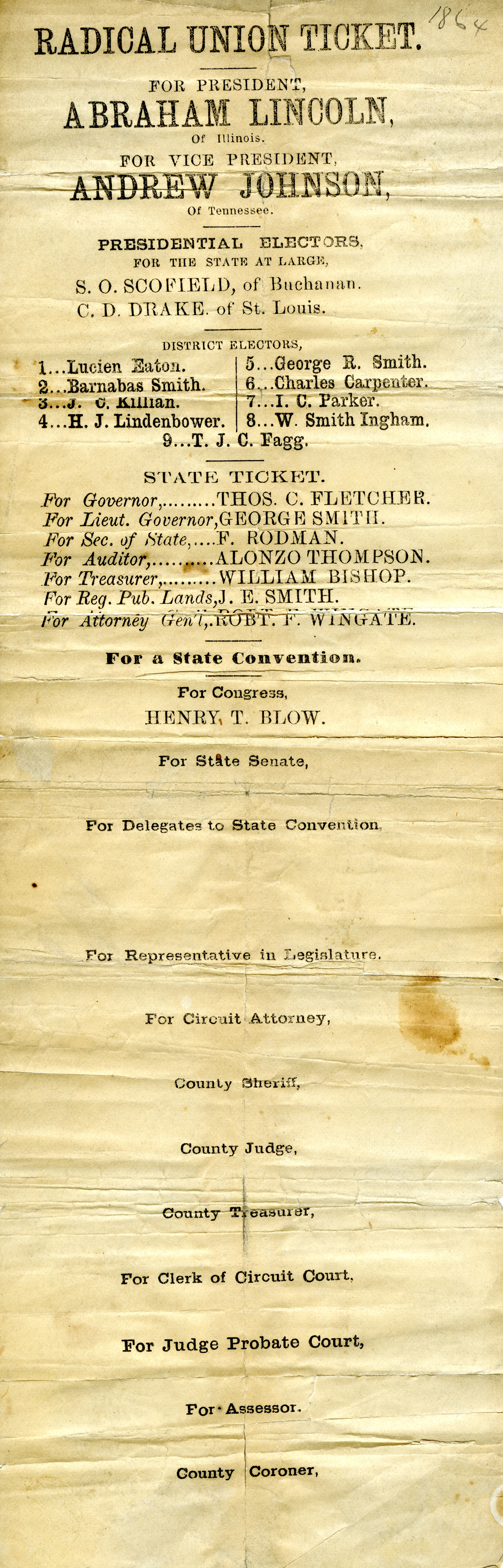
Lincoln-Johnson ticket printed by the Radical Union Party.

== Results ==
1864 United States presidential election in Missouri
| Party | Candidate | Votes | % |
|---|---|---|---|
| National Union | Abraham Lincoln | 72,750 | 69.72% |
| Democratic | George B. McClellan | 31,596 | 30.28% |
| Total votes | | 104,346 | 100% |

=== Results by County ===
1864 United States Presidential Election in Missouri (By County)
| County | Abraham Lincoln National Union | | George B. McClellan Democratic | | Total votes cast |
| County | # | % | # | % | Total votes cast |
|---|---|---|---|---|---|
| Adair | 797 | 83.11% | 162 | 16.89% | 959 |
| Andrew | 1,141 | 95.00% | 60 | 5.00% | 1,201 |
| Atchison | 639 | 98.92% | 7 | 1.08% | 646 |
| Audrain | 126 | 24.32% | 392 | 75.68% | 518 |
| Barry | 197 | 92.06% | 17 | 7.94% | 214 |
| Barton | 28 | 100.00% | 0 | 0.00% | 28 |
| Bates | 27 | 67.50% | 13 | 32.50% | 40 |
| Benton | 574 | 96.47% | 21 | 3.53% | 595 |
| Bollinger | 243 | 95.29% | 12 | 4.71% | 255 |
| Boone | 262 | 45.57% | 313 | 54.43% | 575 |
| Buchanan | 1,914 | 70.19% | 813 | 29.81% | 2,727 |
| Caldwell | 496 | 84.93% | 88 | 15.07% | 584 |
| Callaway | 274 | 22.11% | 965 | 77.89% | 1,239 |
| Camden | 468 | 99.79% | 1 | 0.21% | 469 |
| Cape Girardeau | 1,213 | 68.76% | 551 | 31.24% | 1,764 |
| Carroll | 285 | 71.61% | 113 | 28.39% | 398 |
| Cass | 76 | 41.99% | 105 | 58.01% | 181 |
| Cedar | 297 | 100.00% | 0 | 0.00% | 297 |
| Chariton | 363 | 99.45% | 2 | 0.55% | 365 |
| Christian | 557 | 99.11% | 5 | 0.89% | 562 |
| Clark | 997 | 88.62% | 128 | 11.38% | 1,125 |
| Clay | 216 | 21.75% | 777 | 78.25% | 993 |
| Clinton | 297 | 37.64% | 492 | 62.36% | 789 |
| Cole | 1,256 | 71.44% | 502 | 28.56% | 1,758 |
| Cooper | 939 | 71.14% | 381 | 28.86% | 1,320 |
| Crawford | 297 | 49.17% | 307 | 50.83% | 604 |
| Dade | 507 | 99.92% | 4 | 0.08% | 511 |
| Dallas | 243 | 95.29% | 12 | 4.71% | 255 |
| Daviess | 775 | 73.04% | 286 | 26.96% | 1,061 |
| DeKalb | 400 | 67.00% | 197 | 33.00% | 597 |
| Dent | 107 | 99.07% | 1 | 0.93% | 108 |
| Douglas | 187 | 98.94% | 2 | 1.06% | 189 |
| Franklin | 1,717 | 81.07% | 401 | 18.93% | 2,118 |
| Gasconade | 862 | 82.33% | 185 | 17.67% | 1,047 |
| Gentry | 525 | 65.14% | 281 | 34.86% | 806 |
| Greene | 2,223 | 86.53% | 346 | 13.47% | 2,569 |
| Grundy | 933 | 98.21% | 17 | 1.79% | 950 |
| Harrison | 1,252 | 85.52% | 212 | 14.48% | 1,464 |
| Henry | 465 | 66.71% | 232 | 33.29% | 697 |
| Hickory | 365 | 99.73% | 1 | 0.27% | 366 |
| Holt | 673 | 89.26% | 81 | 10.74% | 754 |
| Howard | 534 | 98.89% | 6 | 1.11% | 540 |
| Iron | 535 | 99.63% | 2 | 0.37% | 537 |
| Jackson | 602 | 51.94% | 557 | 48.06% | 1,159 |
| Jasper | 46 | 95.83% | 2 | 4.17% | 48 |
| Jefferson | 915 | 73.91% | 323 | 26.09% | 1,238 |
| Johnson | 832 | 78.79% | 224 | 21.21% | 1,056 |
| Knox | 669 | 65.78% | 348 | 34.22% | 1,017 |
| Laclede | 659 | 92.95% | 50 | 7.05% | 709 |
| Lafayette | 346 | 46.69% | 395 | 53.31% | 741 |
| Lawrence | 833 | 100.00% | 0 | 0.00% | 833 |
| Lewis | 774 | 59.22% | 533 | 40.78% | 1,307 |
| Lincoln | 542 | 60.29% | 357 | 39.71% | 899 |
| Linn | 907 | 87.04% | 135 | 12.96% | 1,042 |
| Livingston | 442 | 47.07% | 497 | 52.93% | 939 |
| Macon | 1,757 | 98.71% | 23 | 1.29% | 1,780 |
| Madison | 240 | 94.49% | 14 | 5.51% | 254 |
| Maries | 215 | 46.84% | 244 | 53.16% | 459 |
| Marion | 828 | 68.83% | 375 | 31.17% | 1,203 |
| McDonald | 26 | 100.00% | 0 | 0.00% | 26 |
| Mercer | 1,158 | 99.74% | 3 | 0.26% | 1,161 |
| Miller | 565 | 83.58% | 111 | 16.42% | 676 |
| Mississippi | 108 | 29.59% | 257 | 70.41% | 365 |
| Moniteau | 866 | 66.62% | 434 | 33.38% | 1,300 |
| Monroe | 158 | 20.93% | 597 | 79.07% | 755 |
| Montgomery | 530 | 70.20% | 225 | 29.80% | 755 |
| Morgan | 348 | 56.86% | 264 | 34.14% | 612 |
| New Madrid | 99 | 91.67% | 9 | 8.33% | 108 |
| Newton | 212 | 99.53% | 1 | 0.47% | 213 |
| Nodaway | 829 | 98.93% | 9 | 1.07% | 838 |
| Osage | 764 | 52.95% | 679 | 47.05% | 1,443 |
| Ozark | 38 | 100.00% | 0 | 0.00% | 38 |
| Perry | 509 | 81.44% | 116 | 18.56% | 625 |
| Pettis | 879 | 68.94% | 396 | 31.06% | 1,275 |
| Phelps | 985 | 78.93% | 263 | 21.07% | 1,248 |
| Pike | 1,143 | 55.14% | 930 | 44.86% | 2,073 |
| Platte | 496 | 35.99% | 882 | 64.01% | 1,378 |
| Polk | 870 | 99.43% | 5 | 0.57% | 875 |
| Pulaski | 105 | 78.95% | 28 | 21.05% | 133 |
| Putnam | 1,292 | 96.49% | 47 | 3.51% | 1,339 |
| Ralls | 292 | 60.08% | 194 | 39.92% | 486 |
| Randolph | 484 | 59.68% | 327 | 40.32% | 811 |
| Ray | 531 | 39.95% | 798 | 60.05% | 1,329 |
| Reynolds | 7 | 25.93% | 20 | 74.07% | 27 |
| Saline | 170 | 63.43% | 98 | 36.57% | 268 |
| Schuyler | 546 | 74.08% | 191 | 25.92% | 737 |
| Scotland | 612 | 53.45% | 533 | 46.55% | 1,145 |
| Scott | 155 | 45.45% | 186 | 54.55% | 341 |
| Shelby | 366 | 62.89% | 216 | 37.11% | 582 |
| St. Charles | 1,438 | 78.49% | 394 | 21.51% | 1,832 |
| St. Clair | 223 | 99.55% | 1 | 0.45% | 224 |
| St. Francois | 246 | 64.74% | 134 | 35.26% | 380 |
| St. Louis | 14,027 | 61.23% | 8,882 | 38.77% | 22,909 |
| Ste. Genevieve | 423 | 66.09% | 217 | 33.91% | 640 |
| Stoddard | 111 | 94.87% | 6 | 5.13% | 117 |
| Stone | 100 | 100.00% | 0 | 0.00% | 100 |
| Sullivan | 1,074 | 95.38% | 52 | 4.62% | 1,126 |
| Taney | 29 | 100.00% | 0 | 0.00% | 29 |
| Texas | 37 | 78.72% | 10 | 21.28% | 47 |
| Warren | 948 | 77.77% | 271 | 22.23% | 1,219 |
| Washington | 788 | 76.73% | 239 | 23.27% | 1,027 |
| Wayne | 343 | 64.47% | 189 | 35.53% | 532 |
| Webster | 533 | 73.52% | 192 | 26.48% | 725 |
| Worth | 346 | 74.09% | 121 | 25.91% | 467 |
| Wright | 65 | 97.01% | 2 | 2.99% | 67 |
| Totals | 72,750 | 69.72% | 31,596 | 30.28% | 104,346 |

== See also ==
- United States presidential elections in Missouri
