= 1980 United States presidential election in Missouri =

- November 4, 1980

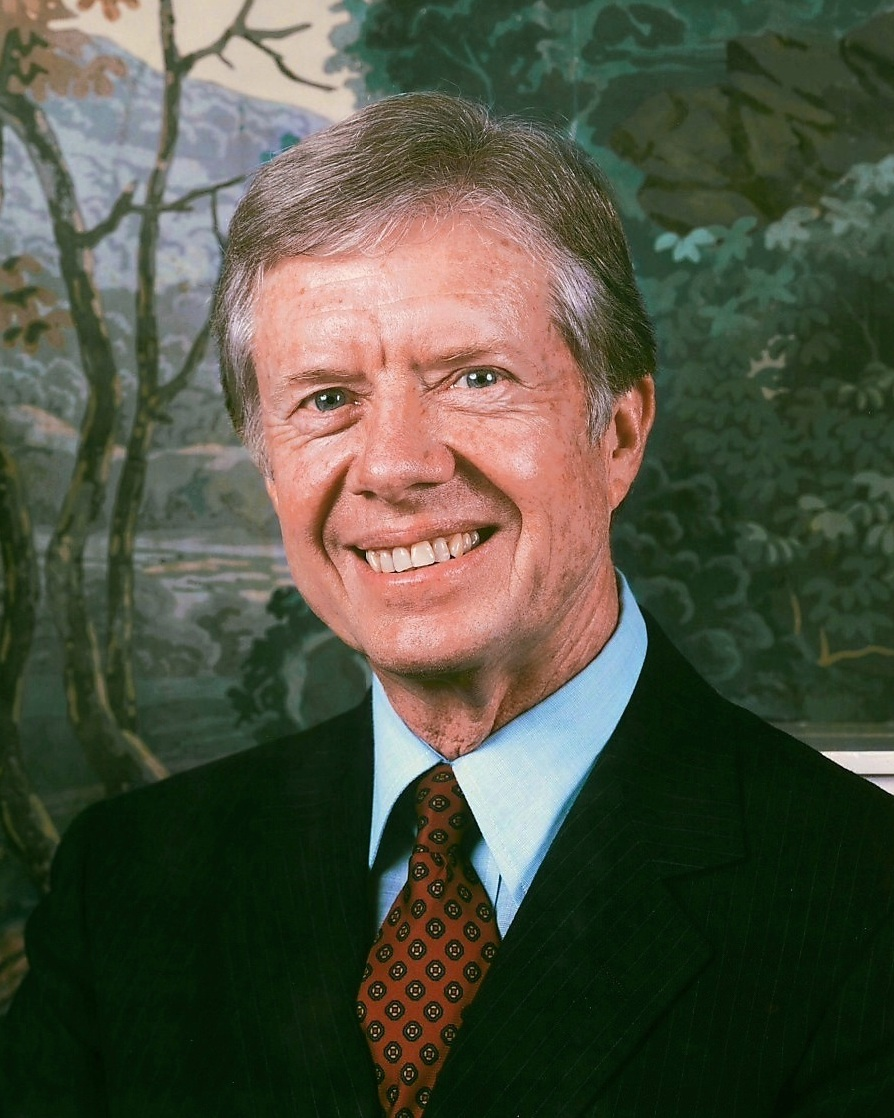
Nominee	Ronald Reagan	Jimmy Carter
Party	Republican	Democratic
Home state	California	Georgia
Running mate	George H. W. Bush	Walter Mondale
Electoral vote	12	0
Popular vote	1,074,181	931,182
Percentage	51.16%	44.35%
County results
Reagan
40–50%
50–60%
60–70%
70–80%
Carter
40–50%
50–60%
60–70%
President before election
Jimmy Carter
Democratic
Elected President
Ronald Reagan
Republican

The 1980 United States presidential election in Missouri took place on November 4, 1980. All 50 states and the District of Columbia were part of the election. Voters chose 12 electors to the Electoral College, who voted for president and vice president.

The state was ultimately carried by Republican Ronald Reagan, who won 51.16% of the vote and went on to be elected president. Missouri continued its bellwether streak, having voted for the eventual presidential winner every election year since 1904, with the sole exception of the 1956 election.

== Results ==
Presidential candidate	Running mate	Party	Electoral vote (EV)	Popular vote (PV)	
Ronald Reagan of California	George H. W. Bush	Republican	12	1,074,181	51.16%
Jimmy Carter (incumbent)	Walter Mondale (incumbent)	Democratic	0	931,182	44.35%
John B. Anderson	Patrick Lucey	Independent	0	77,920	3.71%
Edward Clark	David Koch	Libertarian	0	14,422	0.69%
Clifton DeBerry	Matilde Zimmermann	Socialist Workers	0	1,515	0.07%
Write-ins			0	604	0.03%

=== Results by county ===
County	Ronald Reagan Republican		Jimmy Carter Democratic		John B. Anderson Independent		Edward E. Clark Libertarian		Various candidates Other parties		Margin		Total
County	#	%	#	%	#	%	#	%	#	%	#	%	Total
Adair	5,513	57.90%	3,507	36.83%	414	4.35%	80	0.84%	8	0.08%	2,006	21.07%	9,522
Andrew	3,690	56.14%	2,575	39.18%	245	3.73%	60	0.91%	3	0.05%	1,115	16.96%	6,573
Atchison	2,096	58.94%	1,273	35.80%	151	4.25%	34	0.96%	2	0.06%	823	23.14%	3,556
Audrain	6,347	53.63%	5,168	43.67%	233	1.97%	81	0.68%	5	0.04%	1,179	9.96%	11,834
Barry	7,038	61.42%	4,193	36.59%	150	1.31%	66	0.58%	11	0.10%	2,845	24.83%	11,458
Barton	3,337	61.82%	1,901	35.22%	115	2.13%	44	0.82%	1	0.02%	1,436	26.60%	5,398
Bates	4,061	54.00%	3,297	43.84%	114	1.52%	46	0.61%	3	0.04%	764	10.16%	7,521
Benton	3,451	58.97%	2,241	38.29%	126	2.15%	34	0.58%	0	0.00%	1,210	20.68%	5,852
Bollinger	2,863	56.08%	2,160	42.31%	35	0.74%	35	0.69%	9	0.18%	703	13.77%	5,105
Boone	16,313	42.00%	18,527	47.70%	3,519	9.06%	400	1.03%	78	0.20%	-2,214	-5.70%	38,837
Buchanan	16,551	47.09%	16,967	48.27%	1,301	3.70%	310	0.88%	21	0.06%	-416	-1.18%	35,150
Butler	8,342	58.83%	5,605	39.52%	181	1.28%	48	0.34%	5	0.04%	2,737	19.31%	14,181
Caldwell	2,551	60.36%	1,541	36.46%	108	2.56%	24	0.57%	2	0.05%	1,010	23.90%	4,226
Callaway	6,755	52.63%	5,560	43.32%	420	3.27%	89	0.69%	11	0.09%	1,195	9.31%	12,835
Camden	6,541	63.84%	3,416	33.34%	218	2.13%	68	0.66%	3	0.03%	3,125	30.50%	10,246
Cape Girardeau	14,861	60.54%	8,625	35.13%	873	3.56%	168	0.68%	22	0.09%	6,236	25.41%	24,549
Carroll	3,291	58.95%	2,130	38.15%	130	2.33%	31	0.56%	1	0.02%	1,161	20.80%	5,583
Carter	1,218	51.44%	1,087	45.90%	37	1.56%	23	0.97%	3	0.13%	131	5.54%	2,368
Cass	10,105	52.81%	8,198	42.85%	667	3.48%	147	0.77%	17	0.09%	1,907	9.96%	19,134
Cedar	3,469	65.66%	1,703	32.24%	86	1.63%	24	0.45%	1	0.02%	1,766	33.42%	5,283
Chariton	2,641	53.11%	2,250	45.24%	63	1.27%	16	0.32%	3	0.06%	391	7.87%	4,973
Christian	6,487	63.28%	3,502	34.16%	205	2.00%	56	0.55%	1	0.01%	2,985	29.12%	10,251
Clark	2,042	56.50%	1,494	41.34%	56	1.55%	19	0.53%	3	0.08%	548	15.16%	3,614
Clay	28,521	50.65%	24,250	43.06%	2,782	4.94%	518	0.92%	243	0.43%	4,271	7.59%	56,314
Clinton	3,599	52.52%	3,001	43.80%	184	2.69%	65	0.95%	3	0.04%	598	8.72%	6,852
Cole	16,373	61.96%	9,210	34.86%	691	2.62%	138	0.52%	11	0.04%	7,163	27.10%	26,423
Cooper	3,996	58.34%	2,687	39.23%	130	1.90%	32	0.47%	4	0.06%	1,309	19.11%	6,849
Crawford	4,081	58.21%	2,710	38.65%	170	2.42%	43	0.61%	7	0.10%	1,371	19.56%	7,011
Dade	2,410	63.79%	1,283	33.96%	61	1.61%	23	0.61%	1	0.03%	1,127	29.83%	3,778
Dallas	3,297	60.63%	2,011	36.98%	114	2.10%	15	0.28%	1	0.02%	1,286	23.65%	5,438
Daviess	2,125	53.34%	1,770	44.43%	61	1.53%	24	0.60%	4	0.10%	355	8.91%	3,984
DeKalb	2,062	53.08%	1,677	43.17%	111	2.86%	35	0.90%	0	0.00%	385	9.91%	3,885
Dent	3,477	56.71%	2,528	41.23%	86	1.40%	38	0.62%	2	0.03%	949	15.48%	6,131
Douglas	3,440	65.50%	1,677	31.93%	93	1.77%	40	0.76%	2	0.04%	1,763	33.57%	5,252
Dunklin	5,253	45.56%	6,120	53.08%	128	1.11%	25	0.22%	4	0.03%	-867	-7.52%	11,530
Franklin	15,210	56.69%	10,480	39.06%	863	3.22%	253	0.94%	26	0.10%	4,730	17.63%	26,832
Gasconade	4,481	72.24%	1,550	24.99%	136	2.19%	34	0.55%	2	0.03%	2,931	47.25%	6,203
Gentry	2,005	51.82%	1,720	44.46%	117	3.02%	25	0.65%	2	0.05%	285	7.36%	3,869
Greene	43,116	55.69%	30,498	39.39%	3,261	4.21%	508	0.66%	42	0.05%	12,618	16.30%	77,425
Grundy	2,890	56.60%	2,064	40.42%	110	2.15%	41	0.80%	1	0.02%	826	16.18%	5,106
Harrison	2,734	58.73%	1,732	37.21%	140	3.01%	48	1.03%	1	0.02%	1,002	21.52%	4,655
Henry	4,807	49.19%	4,648	47.56%	238	2.44%	77	0.79%	2	0.02%	159	1.63%	9,772
Hickory	1,893	58.92%	1,248	38.84%	52	1.62%	19	0.59%	1	0.03%	645	20.08%	3,213
Holt	1,993	62.48%	1,119	35.08%	59	1.85%	18	0.56%	1	0.03%	874	27.40%	3,190
Howard	2,179	47.85%	2,243	49.25%	114	2.50%	18	0.40%	0	0.00%	-64	-1.40%	4,554
Howell	7,149	60.06%	4,472	37.57%	211	1.77%	65	0.55%	6	0.05%	2,677	22.49%	11,903
Iron	2,205	48.45%	2,226	48.91%	94	2.07%	23	0.51%	3	0.07%	-21	-0.46%	4,551
Jackson	106,156	41.36%	135,805	52.91%	12,260	4.78%	2,247	0.88%	219	0.09%	-29,649	-11.55%	256,687
Jasper	21,664	62.49%	11,953	34.48%	785	2.26%	256	0.74%	8	0.02%	9,711	28.01%	34,666
Jefferson	28,546	52.01%	24,042	43.81%	1,753	3.19%	526	0.96%	15	0.03%	4,504	8.20%	54,882
Johnson	6,449	51.24%	5,441	43.23%	571	4.54%	110	0.87%	14	0.11%	1,008	8.01%	12,585
Knox	1,475	54.43%	1,187	43.80%	36	1.33%	12	0.44%	0	0.00%	288	10.63%	2,710
Laclede	5,642	60.78%	3,443	37.09%	153	1.65%	43	0.46%	1	0.01%	2,199	23.69%	9,282
Lafayette	7,271	53.99%	5,792	43.01%	339	2.52%	64	0.48%	2	0.01%	1,479	10.98%	13,468
Lawrence	7,921	61.68%	4,670	36.36%	184	1.43%	65	0.51%	3	0.02%	3,251	25.32%	12,843
Lewis	2,350	49.07%	2,314	48.32%	102	2.13%	23	0.48%	0	0.00%	36	0.75%	4,789
Lincoln	4,963	53.17%	4,110	44.03%	182	1.95%	74	0.79%	6	0.06%	853	9.14%	9,335
Linn	3,585	49.63%	3,467	47.99%	139	1.92%	31	0.43%	2	0.03%	118	1.64%	7,224
Livingston	3,654	50.26%	3,368	46.33%	205	2.82%	40	0.55%	3	0.04%	286	3.93%	7,270
Macon	4,430	54.11%	3,578	43.70%	135	1.65%	38	0.46%	6	0.07%	852	10.41%	8,187
Madison	2,618	53.02%	2,231	45.18%	70	1.42%	17	0.34%	2	0.04%	387	7.84%	4,938
Maries	1,985	52.39%	1,732	45.71%	39	1.03%	33	0.87%	0	0.00%	253	6.68%	3,789
Marion	6,036	49.53%	5,890	48.33%	192	1.58%	67	0.55%	1	0.01%	146	1.20%	12,186
McDonald	4,114	60.65%	2,485	36.64%	124	1.83%	60	0.88%	0	0.00%	1,629	24.01%	6,783
Mercer	1,266	58.67%	821	38.04%	54	2.50%	17	0.79%	0	0.00%	445	20.63%	2,158
Miller	5,560	67.93%	2,469	30.16%	115	1.41%	39	0.48%	2	0.02%	3,091	37.77%	8,185
Mississippi	2,459	44.08%	3,040	54.49%	64	1.15%	13	0.23%	3	0.05%	-581	-10.41%	5,579
Moniteau	3,430	58.79%	2,284	39.15%	98	1.68%	21	0.36%	1	0.02%	1,146	19.64%	5,834
Monroe	2,026	44.48%	2,445	53.68%	53	1.16%	30	0.66%	1	0.02%	-419	-9.20%	4,555
Montgomery	3,061	58.58%	2,007	38.41%	124	2.37%	33	0.63%	0	0.00%	1,054	20.17%	5,225
Morgan	3,577	57.86%	2,460	39.79%	114	1.84%	29	0.47%	2	0.03%	1,117	18.07%	6,182
New Madrid	4,041	48.70%	4,171	50.27%	64	0.77%	18	0.22%	4	0.05%	-130	-1.57%	8,298
Newton	10,515	63.11%	5,621	33.74%	341	2.05%	116	0.70%	69	0.41%	4,894	29.37%	16,662
Nodaway	4,544	48.91%	4,257	45.82%	414	4.46%	70	0.75%	5	0.05%	287	3.09%	9,290
Oregon	1,523	39.07%	2,326	59.67%	26	0.67%	22	0.56%	1	0.03%	-803	-20.60%	3,898
Osage	3,679	63.19%	2,045	35.13%	72	1.24%	25	0.43%	1	0.02%	1,634	28.06%	5,822
Ozark	2,434	64.56%	1,242	32.94%	63	1.67%	31	0.82%	0	0.00%	1,192	31.62%	3,770
Pemiscot	3,519	45.51%	4,140	53.54%	52	0.67%	20	0.26%	1	0.01%	-621	-8.03%	7,732
Perry	5,053	65.72%	2,416	31.42%	178	2.31%	41	0.53%	1	0.01%	2,637	34.30%	7,689
Pettis	8,833	55.76%	6,475	40.87%	435	2.75%	91	0.57%	7	0.04%	2,358	14.89%	15,841
Phelps	7,366	54.30%	5,470	40.32%	620	4.57%	99	0.73%	11	0.08%	1,896	13.98%	13,566
Pike	3,932	51.80%	3,454	45.50%	158	2.08%	45	0.59%	2	0.03%	478	6.30%	7,591
Platte	10,092	53.81%	7,342	39.14%	1,107	5.90%	205	1.09%	10	0.05%	2,750	14.67%	18,756
Polk	4,842	57.86%	3,336	39.87%	135	1.61%	54	0.65%	1	0.01%	1,506	17.99%	8,368
Pulaski	3,998	50.79%	3,707	47.10%	128	1.63%	36	0.46%	2	0.03%	291	3.69%	7,871
Putnam	1,722	64.86%	871	32.81%	44	1.66%	18	0.68%	0	0.00%	851	32.05%	2,655
Ralls	1,968	47.51%	2,069	49.95%	75	1.81%	28	0.68%	2	0.05%	-101	-2.44%	4,142
Randolph	5,141	50.03%	4,884	47.53%	213	2.07%	37	0.36%	1	0.01%	257	2.50%	10,276
Ray	4,064	45.81%	4,518	50.93%	215	2.42%	72	0.81%	2	0.02%	-454	-5.12%	8,871
Reynolds	1,271	39.11%	1,919	59.05%	44	1.35%	16	0.49%	0	0.00%	-648	-19.94%	3,250
Ripley	2,524	52.97%	2,156	45.25%	61	1.28%	24	0.50%	0	0.00%	368	7.72%	4,765
St. Charles	36,050	60.32%	20,668	34.58%	2,494	4.17%	515	0.86%	41	0.07%	15,382	25.74%	59,768
St. Clair	2,419	57.46%	1,706	40.52%	60	1.43%	22	0.52%	3	0.07%	713	16.94%	4,210
St. Francois	8,914	52.70%	7,495	44.31%	397	2.35%	107	0.63%	3	0.02%	1,419	8.39%	16,916
St. Louis	263,518	54.35%	192,796	39.77%	25,032	5.16%	3,211	0.66%	274	0.06%	70,722	14.58%	484,831
St. Louis City	50,333	29.48%	113,697	66.59%	5,656	3.31%	914	0.54%	151	0.09%	-63,364	-37.11%	170,751
Ste. Genevieve	2,768	44.00%	3,324	52.84%	151	2.40%	42	0.67%	6	0.10%	-556	-8.84%	6,291
Saline	5,218	49.34%	4,943	46.74%	353	3.34%	58	0.55%	4	0.04%	275	2.60%	10,576
Schuyler	1,386	54.16%	1,114	43.53%	48	1.88%	10	0.39%	1	0.04%	272	10.63%	2,559
Scotland	1,592	55.49%	1,200	41.83%	63	2.20%	14	0.49%	0	0.00%	392	13.66%	2,869
Scott	8,227	53.65%	6,854	44.69%	203	1.32%	45	0.29%	7	0.05%	1,373	8.96%	15,336
Shannon	1,523	44.78%	1,818	53.45%	44	1.29%	14	0.41%	2	0.06%	-295	-8.67%	3,401
Shelby	2,151	52.73%	1,849	45.33%	60	1.47%	16	0.39%	3	0.07%	302	7.40%	4,079
Stoddard	6,199	53.85%	5,128	44.54%	132	1.15%	51	0.44%	2	0.02%	1,071	9.31%	11,512
Stone	4,780	66.31%	2,210	30.66%	180	2.50%	34	0.47%	5	0.07%	2,570	35.65%	7,209
Sullivan	2,412	55.77%	1,824	42.17%	76	1.76%	13	0.30%	0	0.00%	588	13.60%	4,325
Taney	6,230	63.22%	3,389	34.39%	195	1.98%	39	0.40%	1	0.01%	2,841	28.83%	9,854
Texas	4,879	52.41%	4,261	45.77%	125	1.34%	44	0.47%	0	0.00%	618	6.64%	9,309
Vernon	4,391	51.93%	3,704	43.80%	285	3.37%	74	0.88%	2	0.02%	687	8.13%	8,456
Warren	4,366	64.75%	2,132	31.62%	192	2.85%	50	0.74%	3	0.04%	2,234	33.13%	6,743
Washington	3,439	53.19%	2,873	44.44%	89	1.38%	61	0.94%	3	0.05%	566	8.75%	6,465
Wayne	2,823	51.86%	2,549	46.82%	44	0.81%	25	0.46%	3	0.06%	274	5.04%	5,444
Webster	5,121	58.73%	3,409	39.10%	149	1.71%	36	0.41%	4	0.05%	1,712	19.63%	8,719
Worth	833	50.27%	760	45.87%	47	2.84%	17	1.03%	0	0.00%	73	4.40%	1,657
Wright	4,451	66.27%	2,182	32.49%	56	0.83%	23	0.34%	4	0.06%	2,269	33.78%	6,716
Totals	1,074,181	51.16%	931,182	44.35%	77,920	3.71%	14,422	0.69%	2,119	0.10%	142,999	6.81%	2,099,824

==== Counties that flipped from Democratic to Republican ====
- Audrain
- Bates
- Bollinger
- Butler
- Caldwell
- Carroll
- Carter
- Cass
- Chariton
- Clark
- Clay
- Clinton
- Crawford
- Dallas
- Daviess
- DeKalb
- Dent
- Gentry
- Henry
- Howell
- Jefferson
- Johnson
- Knox
- Laclede
- Lewis
- Lincoln
- Linn
- Livingston
- Macon
- Madison
- Maries
- Marion
- McDonald
- Mercer
- Nodaway
- Pettis
- Phelps
- Pike
- Platte
- Pulaski
- Randolph
- Ripley
- St. Clair
- St. Francois
- Schuyler
- Scotland
- Scott
- Saline
- Shelby
- Stoddard
- Sullivan
- Texas
- Vernon
- Washington
- Webster
- Wayne
- Worth

== See also ==
- United States presidential elections in Missouri
