= 2024 United States presidential election in Missouri =

- November 5, 2024
- Turnout: 67.56% (▼2.51 pp)

Nominee	Donald Trump	Kamala Harris
Party	Republican	Democratic
Home state	Florida	California
Running mate	JD Vance	Tim Walz
Electoral vote	10	0
Popular vote	1,751,986	1,200,599
Percentage	58.49%	40.08%

Trump
40–50%
50–60%
60–70%
70–80%
80–90%
90–100%
Harris
40–50%
50–60%
60–70%
70–80%
80–90%
90–100%
Tie/No data
President before election
Joe Biden
Democratic
Elected President
Donald Trump
Republican

The 2024 United States presidential election in Missouri took place on Tuesday, November 5, 2024, as part of the 2024 United States elections in which all 50 states plus the District of Columbia participated. Missouri voters chose electors to represent them in the Electoral College via a popular vote. The state of Missouri has 10 electoral votes in the Electoral College, following reapportionment due to the 2020 United States census in which the state neither gained nor lost a seat.

Prior to the election, all major news organizations considered Missouri a state Trump would win, or a red state. Formerly a bellwether state, Missouri has trended towards the Republican Party in recent years and since the late 2010s has been considered a GOP stronghold at both the federal and state levels.

As he did in the previous two presidential elections, Republican Donald Trump easily won Missouri in 2024, this time by an 18.4% margin. This was 0.1% less than the 2016 margin.

== Primary elections ==
=== Republican caucuses ===
The Missouri Republican caucuses was held on March 2, 2024, alongside the Republican caucuses in Idaho and Michigan.

Missouri Republican caucus, March 2, 2024
Candidate	State delegates	Percentage	Actual delegate count		
Candidate	State delegates	Percentage	Bound	Unbound	Total
Donald Trump	924	100.00	54	0	54
Nikki Haley	0	0.00	0	0	0
David Stuckenberg	0	0.00	0	0	0
Total:	924	100	54	0	54

=== Democratic primary ===
The Missouri Democratic primary was held on March 23, 2024, alongside the Democratic primary in Louisiana.

2024 Missouri Democratic pres. primary
Candidate	Votes	%	Delegates
Joe Biden (incumbent)	16,295	85.31	61
Uncommitted	2,229	11.67	3
Marianne Williamson	298	1.56	0
Dean Phillips (withdrawn)	178	0.93	0
Stephen Lyons (withdrawn)	40	0.21	0
Jason Palmer	36	0.19	0
Armando Perez-Serrato	24	0.13	0
Total	19,100	100%	64

== General election ==
=== Predictions ===
Source	Ranking	As of
Cook Political Report	Solid R	December 19, 2023
Inside Elections	Solid R	April 26, 2023
Sabato's Crystal Ball	Safe R	June 29, 2023
Decision Desk HQ/The Hill	Safe R	December 14, 2023
CNalysis	Solid R	December 30, 2023
CNN	Solid R	January 14, 2024
The Economist	Safe R	June 12, 2024
538	Solid R	October 18, 2024
RCP	Likely R	June 26, 2024
NBC News	Safe R	October 6, 2024

=== Polling ===
Donald J. Trump vs. Kamala Harris

Poll source	Date(s) administered	Sample size (Note: Key: A – all adults RV – registered voters LV – likely voters V – unclear)	Margin of error	Donald J. Trump Republican	Kamala Harris Democratic	Other / Undecided
Research Co.	November 2–3, 2024	450 (LV)	± 4.6%	54%	39%	7%
ActiVote	October 6–27, 2024	400 (LV)	± 4.9%	58%	42%	–
ActiVote	September 8 – October 10, 2024	400 (LV)	± 4.9%	57%	43%	–
Emerson College	September 12–13, 2024	850 (LV)	± 3.3%	53%	43%	4% (Note: "Someone else" with 1%)
Emerson College	September 12–13, 2024	850 (LV)	± 3.3%	55% (Note: With voters who lean towards a given candidate)	43%	2%
Change Research (D)	September 11–13, 2024	1,237 (RV)	± 3.1%	50%	41%	9%
GQR (D)	September 6–12, 2024	645 (LV)	± 3.9%	55%	44%	1%
	August 23, 2024	Robert F. Kennedy Jr. suspends his presidential campaign and endorses Donald J. Trump.				
	August 19–22, 2024	Democratic National Convention				
ActiVote	July 25 – August 22, 2024	400 (LV)	± 4.9%	59%	41%	–
YouGov/Saint Louis University	August 8–16, 2024	900 (LV)	± 3.8%	54%	41%	5% (Note: "Other" with 3%)

Donald J. Trump vs. Kamala Harris vs. Cornel West vs. Jill Stein vs. Chase Oliver

Poll source	Date(s) administered	Sample size	Margin of error	Donald J. Trump Republican	Kamala Harris Democratic	Cornel West Independent	Jill Stein Green	Chase Oliver Libertarian	Other / Undecided
Remington Research Group (R)/Missouri Scout	October 28–29, 2024	721 (LV)	± 3.6%	54%	40%	–	1%	1%	4%

Hypothetical polling with Donald J. Trump and Joe Biden

Donald J. Trump vs. Joe Biden

Poll source	Date(s) administered	Sample size	Margin of error	Donald J. Trump Republican	Joe Biden Democratic	Other / Undecided
Emerson College	June 17–19, 2024	1,000 (RV)	± 3.0%	53%	40%	7%
John Zogby Strategies (Note: Poll conducted for Kennedy's campaign)	April 13–21, 2024	509 (LV)	–	49%	43%	8%
Emerson College	January 23–28, 2024	1,830 (RV)	± 2.2%	49%	32%	19%
Remington Research Group (R)/Missouri Scout	October 10–11, 2023	806 (RV)	± 3.6%	52%	39%	9%
SurveyUSA	October 27 – November 1, 2022	991 (RV)	± 3.7%	52%	34%	14%
Emerson College	October 26–28, 2022	1,000 (LV)	± 3.0%	53%	37%	9%
Emerson College	September 23–27, 2022	1,160 (LV)	± 2.8%	51%	37%	12%
SurveyUSA	September 14–18, 2022	830 (RV)	± 3.9%	52%	35%	13%
SurveyUSA	July 24–27, 2022	1,981 (RV)	± 2.7%	51%	35%	14%
SurveyUSA	May 11–15, 2022	1,412 (LV)	± 3.2%	50%	35%	15%
Remington Research Group (R)/Missouri Scout	September 18–20, 2021	1,014 (LV)	± 2.9%	55%	36%	9%
Remington Research Group (R)/Missouri Scout	April 21–22, 2021	933 (LV)	± 3.0%	53%	38%	9%

Donald J. Trump vs. Joe Biden vs. Robert F. Kennedy Jr. vs. Cornel West vs. Jill Stein

Poll source	Date(s) administered	Sample size	Margin of error	Donald J. Trump Republican	Joe Biden Democratic	Robert F. Kennedy Jr. Independent	Cornel West Independent	Jill Stein Green	Other / Undecided
Emerson College	June 17–19, 2024	1,000 (RV)	± 3.0%	50%	35%	7%	1%	1%	6%

Hypothetical polling with other candidates

Donald J. Trump vs. Robert F. Kennedy Jr.

Poll source	Date(s) administered	Sample size	Margin of error	Donald J. Trump Republican	Robert Kennedy Jr. Independent	Other / Undecided
John Zogby Strategies	April 13–21, 2024	509 (LV)	–	45%	42%	13%

Robert F. Kennedy Jr. vs. Joe Biden

Poll source	Date(s) administered	Sample size	Margin of error	Robert F. Kennedy Jr. Independent	Joe Biden Democratic	Other / Undecided
John Zogby Strategies	April 13–21, 2024	509 (LV)	–	51%	36%	13%

=== Results ===
State House district results: Trump 40–50% 50–60% 60–70% 70–80% 80–90% / Harris 40–50% 50–60% 60–70% 70–80% 80–90% 90–100%

2024 United States presidential election in Missouri
Party	Candidate	Votes	%	±%
Republican	Donald Trump; JD Vance	1,751,986	58.49	+1.69
Democratic	Kamala Harris; Tim Walz	1,200,599	40.08	−1.33
Libertarian	Chase Oliver; Mike ter Maat	23,876	0.80	−0.56
Green	Jill Stein; Butch Ware	17,135	0.57	+0.30
Write-in		1,731	0.06	+0.03
Total votes		2,995,327	100.00	N/A

==== By county ====
County	Donald Trump Republican		Kamala Harris Democratic		Various candidates Other parties		Margin		Total
County	#	%	#	%	#	%	#	%	Total
Adair	6,771	66.13%	3,334	32.56%	134	1.31%	3,437	33.57%	10,239
Andrew	7,407	75.22%	2,312	23.48%	128	1.30%	5,095	51.74%	9,847
Atchison	2,152	79.32%	529	19.50%	32	1.18%	1,623	59.82%	2,713
Audrain	7,699	73.16%	2,688	25.54%	136	1.29%	5,011	47.62%	10,523
Barry	13,138	81.27%	2,873	17.77%	154	0.95%	10,265	63.50%	16,165
Barton	5,159	85.77%	820	13.63%	36	0.60%	4,339	72.14%	6,015
Bates	6,702	80.32%	1,563	18.73%	79	0.95%	5,139	61.59%	8,344
Benton	8,526	79.17%	2,166	20.11%	77	0.72%	6,360	59.06%	10,769
Bollinger	5,365	87.08%	756	12.27%	40	0.65%	4,609	74.81%	6,161
Boone	39,673	44.03%	48,452	53.77%	1,985	2.20%	-8,779	-9.74%	90,110
Buchanan	22,606	63.25%	12,598	35.25%	539	1.51%	10,008	28.00%	35,743
Butler	14,549	81.46%	3,160	17.69%	151	0.85%	11,389	63.77%	17,860
Caldwell	3,771	80.18%	888	18.88%	44	0.94%	2,883	61.30%	4,703
Callaway	15,206	70.87%	5,926	27.62%	323	1.51%	9,280	43.25%	21,455
Camden	19,597	76.71%	5,724	22.40%	227	0.89%	13,873	54.30%	25,548
Cape Girardeau	29,315	72.65%	10,561	26.17%	477	1.18%	18,754	46.47%	40,353
Carroll	3,708	81.89%	789	17.42%	31	0.68%	2,919	64.47%	4,528
Carter	2,488	86.93%	364	12.72%	10	0.35%	2,124	74.21%	2,862
Cass	38,792	65.36%	19,753	33.28%	804	1.35%	19,039	32.08%	59,349
Cedar	6,064	84.36%	1,060	14.75%	64	0.89%	5,004	69.62%	7,188
Chariton	3,179	77.75%	875	21.40%	35	0.86%	2,304	56.35%	4,089
Christian	38,379	75.57%	11,850	23.33%	560	1.10%	26,529	52.23%	50,789
Clark	2,679	80.38%	628	18.84%	26	0.78%	2,051	61.54%	3,333
Clay	67,688	52.00%	60,345	46.36%	2,127	1.63%	7,343	5.64%	130,160
Clinton	8,235	73.33%	2,855	25.42%	140	1.25%	5,380	47.91%	11,230
Cole	26,686	66.46%	12,874	32.06%	592	1.47%	13,812	34.40%	40,152
Cooper	6,393	72.36%	2,347	26.56%	95	1.08%	4,046	45.80%	8,835
Crawford	8,742	80.73%	2,007	18.53%	80	0.74%	6,735	62.19%	10,829
Dade	3,480	83.13%	671	16.03%	35	0.84%	2,809	67.10%	4,186
Dallas	6,907	81.83%	1,458	17.27%	76	0.90%	5,449	64.55%	8,441
Daviess	3,185	81.15%	701	17.86%	39	0.99%	2,484	63.29%	3,925
DeKalb	3,885	80.70%	870	18.07%	59	1.23%	3,015	62.63%	4,814
Dent	6,013	84.65%	1,025	14.43%	65	0.92%	4,988	70.22%	7,103
Douglas	6,242	85.64%	996	13.66%	51	0.70%	5,246	71.97%	7,289
Dunklin	8,096	80.55%	1,885	18.75%	70	0.70%	6,211	61.79%	10,051
Franklin	40,126	72.35%	14,694	26.49%	644	1.16%	25,432	45.85%	55,464
Gasconade	6,370	79.65%	1,555	19.44%	72	0.90%	4,815	60.21%	7,997
Gentry	2,651	80.53%	616	18.71%	25	0.76%	2,035	61.82%	3,292
Greene	85,956	59.68%	55,971	38.86%	2,110	1.46%	29,985	20.82%	144,037
Grundy	3,582	81.34%	784	17.80%	38	0.86%	2,798	63.53%	4,404
Harrison	3,293	85.64%	534	13.89%	18	0.47%	2,759	71.76%	3,845
Henry	8,286	75.80%	2,535	23.19%	111	1.02%	5,751	52.61%	10,932
Hickory	4,108	80.23%	978	19.10%	34	0.66%	3,130	61.13%	5,120
Holt	1,982	84.27%	357	15.18%	13	0.55%	1,625	69.09%	2,352
Howard	3,534	71.31%	1,341	27.06%	81	1.63%	2,193	44.25%	4,956
Howell	15,733	82.94%	3,073	16.20%	162	0.85%	12,660	66.74%	18,968
Iron	3,644	80.66%	824	18.24%	50	1.11%	2,820	62.42%	4,518
Jackson	125,610	39.50%	187,026	58.81%	5,381	1.69%	-61,416	-19.31%	318,017
Jasper	39,084	72.64%	13,943	25.91%	780	1.45%	25,141	46.72%	53,807
Jefferson	80,796	67.72%	36,965	30.98%	1,553	1.30%	43,831	36.74%	119,314
Johnson	16,298	69.05%	6,960	29.49%	344	1.46%	9,338	39.56%	23,602
Knox	1,479	81.71%	311	17.18%	20	1.10%	1,168	64.53%	1,810
Laclede	14,155	82.89%	2,756	16.14%	165	0.97%	11,399	66.75%	17,076
Lafayette	12,720	73.75%	4,294	24.90%	234	1.36%	8,426	48.85%	17,248
Lawrence	15,001	81.41%	3,248	17.63%	178	0.97%	11,753	63.78%	18,427
Lewis	3,565	79.47%	872	19.44%	49	1.09%	2,693	60.03%	4,486
Lincoln	24,866	77.38%	6,908	21.50%	359	1.12%	17,958	55.89%	32,133
Linn	4,437	78.02%	1,183	20.80%	67	1.18%	3,254	57.22%	5,687
Livingston	5,395	78.50%	1,422	20.69%	56	0.81%	3,973	57.81%	6,873
Macon	6,300	80.37%	1,481	18.89%	58	0.74%	4,819	61.47%	7,839
Madison	4,721	82.06%	986	17.14%	46	0.80%	3,735	64.92%	5,753
Maries	3,987	83.31%	755	15.78%	44	0.92%	3,232	67.53%	4,786
Marion	9,991	75.96%	3,032	23.05%	130	0.99%	6,959	52.91%	13,153
McDonald	7,843	83.99%	1,423	15.24%	72	0.77%	6,420	68.75%	9,338
Mercer	1,545	86.22%	235	13.11%	12	0.67%	1,310	73.10%	1,792
Miller	10,826	83.21%	2,067	15.89%	118	0.91%	8,759	67.32%	13,011
Mississippi	3,404	76.51%	1,015	22.81%	30	0.67%	2,389	53.70%	4,449
Moniteau	5,877	80.78%	1,313	18.05%	85	1.17%	4,564	62.74%	7,275
Monroe	3,476	79.40%	857	19.58%	45	1.03%	2,619	59.82%	4,378
Montgomery	4,776	79.63%	1,170	19.51%	52	0.87%	3,606	60.12%	5,998
Morgan	7,725	79.35%	1,914	19.66%	96	0.99%	5,811	59.69%	9,735
New Madrid	5,203	76.39%	1,561	22.92%	47	0.69%	3,642	53.47%	6,811
Newton	22,923	78.78%	5,867	20.16%	307	1.06%	17,056	58.62%	29,097
Nodaway	6,909	71.31%	2,674	27.60%	106	1.09%	4,235	43.71%	9,689
Oregon	3,884	84.20%	696	15.09%	33	0.72%	3,188	69.11%	4,613
Osage	6,657	86.15%	1,009	13.06%	61	0.79%	5,648	73.09%	7,727
Ozark	4,044	84.60%	698	14.60%	38	0.79%	3,346	70.00%	4,780
Pemiscot	3,917	74.33%	1,331	25.26%	22	0.42%	2,586	49.07%	5,270
Perry	7,986	81.29%	1,757	17.88%	81	0.82%	6,229	63.41%	9,824
Pettis	13,907	73.65%	4,703	24.91%	272	1.44%	9,204	48.74%	18,882
Phelps	13,658	70.77%	5,379	27.87%	263	1.36%	8,279	42.90%	19,300
Pike	6,151	78.62%	1,618	20.68%	55	0.70%	4,533	57.94%	7,824
Platte	29,381	50.82%	27,566	47.68%	870	1.50%	1,815	3.14%	57,817
Polk	12,691	80.19%	2,948	18.63%	187	1.18%	9,743	61.56%	15,826
Pulaski	11,579	74.47%	3,765	24.21%	205	1.32%	7,814	50.25%	15,549
Putnam	2,021	84.92%	347	14.58%	12	0.50%	1,674	70.34%	2,380
Ralls	4,575	79.19%	1,154	19.98%	48	0.83%	3,421	59.22%	5,777
Randolph	8,322	75.46%	2,571	23.31%	135	1.22%	5,751	52.15%	11,028
Ray	8,602	73.76%	2,927	25.10%	133	1.14%	5,675	48.66%	11,662
Reynolds	2,560	83.69%	472	15.43%	27	0.88%	2,088	68.26%	3,059
Ripley	5,002	86.18%	763	13.15%	39	0.67%	4,239	73.04%	5,804
Saline	6,498	69.65%	2,726	29.22%	106	1.14%	3,772	40.43%	9,330
Schuyler	1,588	81.65%	334	17.17%	23	1.18%	1,254	64.47%	1,945
Scotland	1,537	80.14%	358	18.67%	23	1.20%	1,179	61.47%	1,918
Scott	13,786	79.13%	3,525	20.23%	110	0.63%	10,261	58.90%	17,421
Shannon	3,364	83.72%	625	15.56%	29	0.72%	2,739	68.17%	4,018
Shelby	2,691	82.50%	550	16.86%	21	0.64%	2,141	65.63%	3,262
St. Charles	130,588	57.74%	92,226	40.78%	3,352	1.48%	38,362	16.96%	226,166
St. Clair	3,982	79.80%	959	19.22%	49	0.98%	3,023	60.58%	4,990
St. Francois	21,521	75.21%	6,811	23.80%	283	0.99%	14,710	51.41%	28,615
St. Louis City	19,342	16.64%	94,458	81.24%	2,471	2.13%	-75,116	-64.60%	116,271
St. Louis County	187,982	37.39%	305,635	60.79%	9,121	1.81%	-117,653	-23.40%	502,738
Ste. Genevieve	7,031	71.92%	2,629	26.89%	116	1.19%	4,402	45.03%	9,776
Stoddard	11,783	86.65%	1,736	12.77%	80	0.59%	10,047	73.88%	13,599
Stone	15,357	80.31%	3,620	18.93%	146	0.76%	11,737	61.38%	19,123
Sullivan	2,035	82.62%	408	16.57%	20	0.81%	1,627	66.06%	2,463
Taney	21,236	79.17%	5,329	19.87%	259	0.97%	15,907	59.30%	26,824
Texas	9,855	85.51%	1,589	13.79%	81	0.70%	8,266	71.72%	11,525
Vernon	7,112	79.26%	1,774	19.77%	87	0.97%	5,338	59.49%	8,973
Warren	14,915	74.22%	4,970	24.73%	210	1.05%	9,945	49.49%	20,095
Washington	8,424	82.29%	1,747	17.07%	66	0.64%	6,677	65.22%	10,237
Wayne	5,030	86.03%	783	13.39%	34	0.58%	4,247	72.64%	5,847
Webster	15,984	80.67%	3,653	18.44%	177	0.89%	12,331	62.23%	19,814
Worth	904	81.81%	190	17.19%	11	1.00%	714	64.62%	1,105
Wright	7,850	87.42%	1,057	11.77%	73	0.81%	6,793	75.65%	8,980
Totals	1,751,986	58.49%	1,200,599	40.08%	42,742	1.43%	551,387	18.41%	2,995,327

==== By congressional district ====
Trump won six of eight congressional districts.

District	Trump	Harris	Representative
1st	20.53%	77.66%	Cori Bush (118th Congress)
1st	20.53%	77.66%	Wesley Bell (119th Congress)
2nd	53.12%	45.17%	Ann Wagner
3rd	62.63%	35.91%	Blaine Luetkemeyer (118th Congress)
3rd	62.63%	35.91%	Bob Onder (119th Congress)
4th	70.42%	28.30%	Mark Alford
5th	37.41%	60.81%	Emanuel Cleaver
6th	68.82%	29.97%	Sam Graves
7th	70.71%	28.06%	Eric Burlison
8th	76.46%	22.57%	Jason Smith

== Analysis ==
Missouri is a Midwestern state with heavy Southern cultural influence, having been a Southern border state and contested between the Union and Confederacy during the Civil War. A bellwether state for the bulk of the 20th century well into the 2000s (backing the winner of all but one presidential election for a century, from 1904 to 2004, the exception being 1956 by just 0.22% and less than 4,000 votes), Missouri has voted Republican in every presidential election since 2000. It is widely understood to have lost its bellwether status when Democrat Barack Obama of neighboring Illinois failed to carry the state in either of his presidential victories, followed by Republican Donald Trump carrying it by more than 15% in all three of his election bids.

The state is largely located in the conservative Bible Belt, with the southern portion of the state being part of the Upland South, Missouri has drifted away from being a political bellwether towards the Republican Party in the 21st century and is now a strongly red state, with Republicans occupying every statewide office since 2023. Democratic strength in Missouri is nowadays largely limited to the Kansas City and St. Louis areas, as well as the college town of Columbia.

Democrat Kamala Harris won the same jurisdictions that Joe Biden did in 2020, as did Hillary Clinton in 2016 and Obama in 2012: Jackson County, home to Kansas City; Boone County, home to Columbia; the independent city of St. Louis; and St. Louis County, which contains many of St. Louis's closest suburbs.

Despite losing the state, Harris did marginally better than Hillary Clinton in 2016 by margin in the state. 2024 Missouri Amendment 3 also narrowly passed by 3.2%, legalizing abortion in Missouri.

== See also ==
- United States presidential elections in Missouri
- 2024 Missouri Amendment 3
- 2024 United States presidential election
- 2024 Democratic Party presidential primaries
- 2024 Republican Party presidential primaries
- 2024 United States elections

== Notes ==
Partisan clients
