= 2012 United States presidential election in Missouri =

- November 6, 2012
- Turnout: 65.95% (▼3.45 pp)

Nominee	Mitt Romney	Barack Obama
Party	Republican	Democratic
Home state	Massachusetts	Illinois
Running mate	Paul Ryan	Joe Biden
Electoral vote	10	0
Popular vote	1,482,440	1,223,796
Percentage	53.64%	44.28%

Romney
50–60%
60–70%
70–80%
Obama
50–60%
70–80%
80–90%
President before election
Barack Obama
Democratic
Elected President
Barack Obama
Democratic

The 2012 United States presidential election in Missouri took place on November 6, 2012, as part of the 2012 United States presidential election, in which all 50 states plus the District of Columbia participated. Missouri voters chose 10 electors to represent them in the Electoral College via a popular vote pitting incumbent Democratic President Barack Obama and his running mate, Vice President Joe Biden, against Republican challenger and former Massachusetts Governor Mitt Romney and his running mate, Congressman Paul Ryan.

Missouri was won by Romney, who took 53.64% of the vote to Obama's 44.28%, a margin of 9.36%. Although it was a battleground in past elections, and considered a bellwether up until 2008, Missouri trended in the early 21st century toward the Republicans, having been the only long-time swing state to be won (albeit narrowly) by Republican John McCain in 2008. Consequently, the state was not heavily contested by either side in 2012, and Romney ultimately carried Missouri by the largest margin since Ronald Reagan's 1984 landslide.

Romney became the second Republican to carry Missouri and lose the presidency just four years after John McCain's narrow victory in the state, with Obama also becoming the only Democrat to ever win two terms in the White House without carrying the state at least once. Despite losing the state, Obama remains the last Democratic nominee to lose Missouri by less than 10%, as of 2024.

== Primary elections ==
=== Democratic primary ===
Missouri Democratic primary, February 7, 2012
Candidate	Votes	Percentage	Delegates
Barack Obama (incumbent)	64,366	88.39%	89
Randall Terry	1,998	2.74%	-
John Wolfe Jr.	1,000	1.37%	-
Darcy Richardson	873	1.20%	-
Uncommitted	4,580	6.29%	-

=== Republican primary ===
2012 Missouri Republican presidential primary
- February 7, 2012
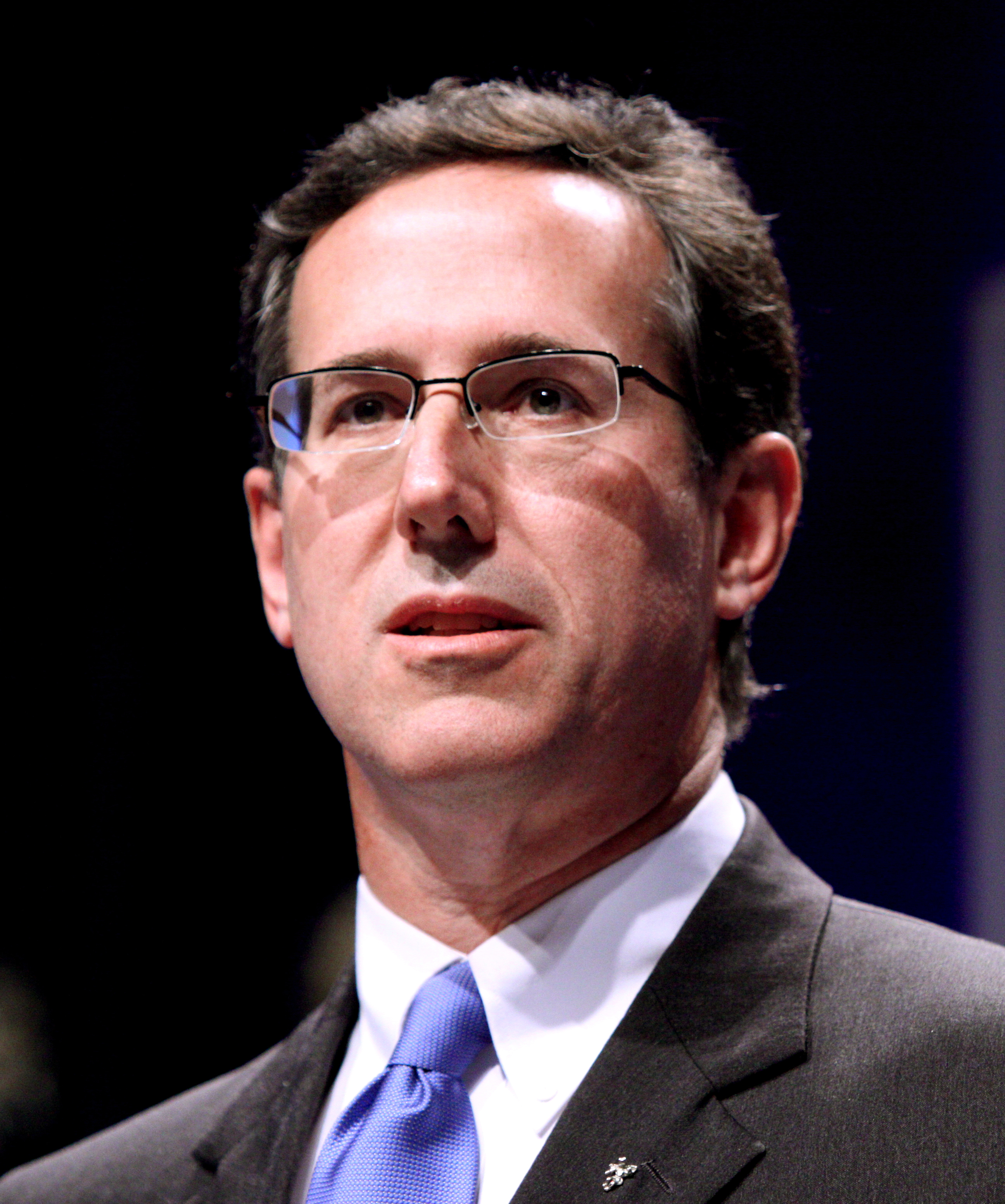

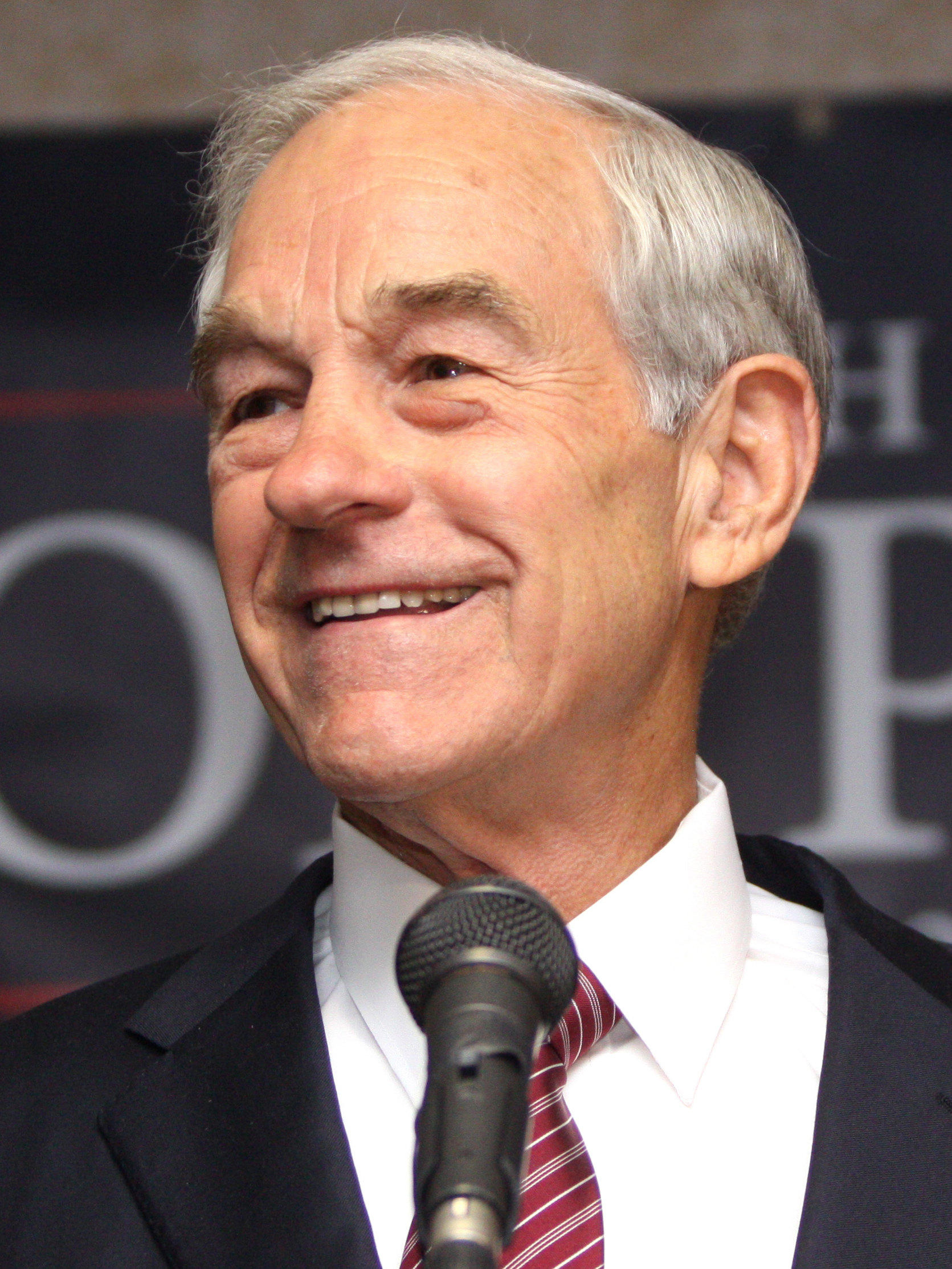
Candidate	Rick Santorum	Mitt Romney	Ron Paul
Home state	Pennsylvania	Massachusetts	Texas
Popular vote	139,272	63,882	30,647
Percentage	55.23%	25.33%	12.15%
- County results Rick Santorum

The 2012 Missouri Republican presidential primary took place on February 7 and the caucuses ran from March 15 to March 24, 2012, except for one rescheduled for April 10. The primary election did not determine which delegates would be sent to the national convention; this is instead determined indirectly by the caucuses and directly by the Missouri Republican congressional-district conventions on April 21 and the state convention on June 2.

The unusual situation of having both the primary election and the caucus for the same party in the same election year in Missouri arose as a result of a change in the nominating rules of the Republican Party. State primaries in Missouri were previously held in early February. In September 2008, the Republican National Committee adopted a set of rules which included a provision that no states except Iowa, New Hampshire, South Carolina, and Nevada were allowed to begin the process of delegate selection (including binding primary elections) before the first Tuesday in March of an election year. In 2011, the Republican-controlled Missouri General Assembly attempted to move the primary election to mid-March, but the bill was vetoed by Democratic Governor Jay Nixon because of a provision limiting his power to fill vacancies in statewide elected offices. In a compromise solution, it was decided that Republican primary election would be made non-binding and instead delegates would be nominated by separate caucuses in late March, a move estimated to cost the state US$7,000,000.

This marks the first time since 1996 that Missouri Republicans used a caucus system to nominate delegates to the Republican National Convention.

==== Primary ====
The primary was not to affect the selection of Missouri's delegates to the 2012 Republican National Convention, so it had no official effect on the nomination and was widely described beforehand as a "beauty contest". However it was seen as an opportunity for Rick Santorum to face off against Mitt Romney due to the absence of Newt Gingrich, who missed the filing deadline and was not on the ballot. Santorum was the only candidate to actively campaign in the state ahead of the primary.

The primary election was won by Santorum, who also won the Colorado and Minnesota Republican caucuses held that day.

There were 326,438 total votes cast by party ballot (including votes for Democratic, Libertarian and Constitution Party candidates), a turnout of 7.99% of 4,085,582 registered voters. Noting the low Republican turnout, NPR found voters apathetic because the primary was nonbinding.

2012 Missouri Republican primary
Candidate	Votes	Percentage
Rick Santorum	139,272	55.23%
Mitt Romney	63,882	25.33%
Ron Paul	30,647	12.15%
Uncommitted	9,853	3.91%
Rick Perry	2,456	0.97%
Herman Cain	2,306	0.91%
Michele Bachmann	1,680	0.67%
Jon Huntsman	1,044	0.41%
Gary Johnson	536	0.21%
Michael J. Meehan	356	0.14%
Keith Drummond	153	0.06%
Totals	252,185	100.00%

Key:	Withdrew prior to contest.

==== Caucuses ====
The county caucuses elect delegates to congressional district conventions and the Missouri Republican Party state convention, which in turn elect 49 of Missouri's 52 delegates to the national convention. However, no straw poll is released to indicate levels of support to the general public. According to the state party, "Caucus-goers will be voting for delegates, and with few exceptions, these delegates will not be bound to a particular candidate. Because there is no vote on candidate preference, neither the Missouri GOP nor any election authority will have or release any data regarding the 'winner' of the caucuses."

Despite the nonbinding nature of the February primary, caucuses had the option to use its result as the basis for delegate allocation. Santorum was to appear personally at some caucuses, which The New York Times described as "part of the campaign's county-by-county strategy to try to outflank Mr. Romney and catch him in the delegate race".

===== Results =====
The county caucuses elect delegates to the congressional district conventions and the state convention. Delegates to the national convention are elected at each of those conventions. Typically, the body of a caucus votes on slates of delegates prepared by leaders of factions and coalitions within the caucus.

The following table shows who won the majority or plurality of delegates for each county according to available unofficial reports.

Election results by county. Dark green indicates counties won by Santorum, gold, those won by Paul, orange indicates those won by Romney, and purple, Gingrich. The counties indicated in black are Barry County and Laclede County, in which Romney/Santorum and Paul/Santorum respectively tied for the win. Dark gray indicates uncommitted counties.

====== By number of counties won ======
Candidate	Counties
Rick Santorum	83
Mitt Romney	17
Ron Paul	11
Newt Gingrich	4
Uncommitted	0
Unknown	0
Total	115

====== By county ======
County	Winner	Delegates	District	Source
Adair	Romney	9	6th	
Andrew	Santorum	8	6th	
Atchison	Santorum	3	6th	
Audrain	Santorum	7	4th	
Barry	Romney	14	7th	
Barton	Santorum	7	4th	
Bates	Santorum	7	4th	
Benton	Santorum	9	4th	
Bollinger	Santorum	6	8th	
Boone	Paul	53	4th	
Buchanan	Romney	28	6th	
Butler	Santorum	17	8th	
Caldwell	Romney	4	6th	
Callaway	Romney	17	3rd	
Camden	Santorum	12	3rd	
Cape Girardeau	Santorum	36	8th	
Carroll	Santorum	5	6th	
Carter	Santorum	3	8th	
Cass	Santorum	43	4th	
Cedar	Santorum	6	4th	
Chariton	Santorum	4	6th	
Christian	Santorum	37	7th	
Clark	Santorum	3	6th	
Clay	Romney	23+55	5th, 6th	
Clinton	Romney	9	6th	
Cole	Romney	35	3rd	
Cooper	Santorum	8	4th	
Crawford	Santorum	9	8th	
Dade	Santorum	5	4th	
Dallas	Romney	7	4th	
Daviess	Santorum	4	6th	
DeKalb	Santorum	5	6th	
Dent	Santorum	7	8th	
Douglas	Paul	7	8th	
Dunklin	Santorum	11	8th	
Franklin	Paul	40	3rd	
Gasconade	Santorum	7	3rd	
Gentry	Santorum	3	6th	
Greene	Paul	111	7th	
Grundy	Paul	5	6th	
Harrison	Romney	4	6th	
Henry	Santorum	9	4th	
Hickory	Santorum	5	4th	
Holt	Santorum	3	6th	
Howard	Santorum	4	4th	
Howell	Santorum	16	8th	
Iron	Santorum	3	8th	
Jackson	Paul	144+35	5th, 6th	
Jasper	Santorum	46	7th	
Jefferson	Santorum	15+39+19	2nd, 3rd, 8th	
Johnson	Santorum	18	4th	
Knox	Santorum	2	6th	
Laclede	Paul	16	4th	
Lafayette	Romney	14	5th	
Lawrence	Santorum	17	7th	
Lewis	Santorum	4	6th	
Lincoln	Santorum	19	3rd	
Linn	Santorum	5	6th	
Livingston	Gingrich	6	6th	
Macon	Santorum	7	6th	
Madison	Santorum	5	8th	
Maries	Santorum	5	3rd	
Marion	Santorum	12	6th	
McDonald	Santorum	8	7th	
Mercer	Santorum	2	6th	
Miller	Romney	12	3rd	
Mississippi	Santorum	5	8th	
Moniteau	Santorum	7	4th	
Monroe	Santorum	4	6th	
Montgomery	Santorum	5	3rd	
Morgan	Santorum	8	4th	
New Madrid	Santorum	7	8th	
Newton	Santorum	26	7th	
Nodaway	Paul	8	6th	
Oregon	Santorum	4	8th	
Osage	Santorum	8	3rd	
Ozark	Santorum	5	8th	
Pemiscot	Santorum	6	8th	
Perry	Gingrich	8	8th	
Pettis	Romney	16	4th	
Phelps	Romney	17	8th	
Pike	Santorum	7	6th	
Platte	Gingrich	35	6th	
Polk	Santorum	13	7th	
Pulaski	Santorum	14	4th	
Putnam	Santorum	3	6th	
Ralls	Santorum	5	6th	
Randolph	Romney	10	4th	
Ray	Santorum	8	5th	
Reynolds	Santorum	3	8th	
Ripley	Santorum	5	8th	
St. Charles	Paul	59+88	2nd, 3rd	
St. Clair	Santorum	5	4th	
St. Francois	Santorum	19	8th	
St. Louis	Romney (Note: A separate caucus was held in each township.)	67+250	1st, 2nd	
Saint Louis (city)	Paul	36	1st	
Sainte Genevieve	Santorum	6	8th	
Saline	Santorum	8	5th	
Schuyler	Santorum	2	6th	
Scotland	Santorum	2	6th	
Scott	Santorum	17	8th	
Shannon	Santorum	3	8th	
Shelby	Santorum	4	6th	
Stoddard	Romney	14	8th	
Stone	Santorum	16	7th	
Sullivan	Santorum	3	6th	
Taney	Paul	22	7th	
Texas	Gingrich	11	8th	
Vernon	Santorum	8	4th	
Warren	Santorum	13	3rd	
Washington	Santorum	7	8th	
Wayne	Santorum	6	8th	
Webster	Santorum	11+4	4th, 7th	
Worth	Santorum	2	6th	
Wright	Santorum	9	8th	

==== Controversies ====
There were controversies surrounding the caucuses in Clay and Cass counties. The Missouri Republican Party ruled later that the slates of delegates elected at those caucuses were valid. A do-over caucus was required in St. Charles County after the first attempt disbanded over a rules dispute. Controversy also arose at the Jefferson County caucus, and a challenge was filed but later withdrawn.

==== District and state conventions ====
The following table shows who won the national delegates for each congressional district and statewide.

Convention results
Candidate	1st	2nd	3rd	4th	5th	6th	7th	8th	State	Party leaders	Total
Mitt Romney	1	1	2	3	0	1	1	3	19	0	31
Rick Santorum	1	2	1	0	0	1	2	0	6	0	13
Ron Paul	1	0	0	0	3	0	0	0	0	0	4
Newt Gingrich	0	0	0	0	0	1	0	0	0	0	1
Uncommitted	0	0	0	0	0	0	0	0	0	3	3
Total	24								25	3	52

== General election ==
=== Predictions ===
Source	Ranking	As of
Huffington Post	Tossup	November 6, 2012
CNN	Safe R	November 6, 2012
New York Times	Lean R	November 6, 2012
Washington Post	Safe R	November 6, 2012
RealClearPolitics	Lean R	November 6, 2012
Sabato's Crystal Ball	Solid R	November 5, 2012
FiveThirtyEight	Solid R	November 6, 2012

=== Results ===
2012 United States presidential election in Missouri
Party	Candidate	Running mate	Votes	Percentage	Electoral votes
Republican	Mitt Romney	Paul Ryan	1,482,440	53.64%	10
Democratic	Barack Obama (incumbent)	Joe Biden (incumbent)	1,223,796	44.28%	0
Libertarian	Gary Johnson	Jim Gray	43,151	1.57%	0
Constitution	Virgil Goode	Jim Clymer	7,936	0.29%	0
Totals			2,757,323	100.00%	10

==== By county ====
County	Mitt Romney Republican		Barack Obama Democratic		Various candidates Other parties		Margin		Total
County	#	%	#	%	#	%	#	%	Total
Adair	5,651	55.81%	4,219	41.67%	256	2.52%	1,432	14.14%	10,126
Andrew	5,457	65.42%	2,649	31.76%	235	2.82%	2,808	33.66%	8,341
Atchison	1,902	70.21%	756	27.91%	51	1.88%	1,146	42.30%	2,709
Audrain	6,186	61.97%	3,539	35.45%	257	2.58%	2,647	26.52%	9,982
Barry	9,832	71.22%	3,667	26.56%	307	2.22%	6,165	44.66%	13,806
Barton	4,418	76.89%	1,230	21.41%	98	1.70%	3,188	55.48%	5,746
Bates	5,020	64.60%	2,557	32.90%	194	2.50%	2,463	31.70%	7,771
Benton	6,069	66.28%	2,925	31.94%	163	1.78%	3,144	34.34%	9,157
Bollinger	4,095	75.05%	1,213	22.23%	148	2.72%	2,882	52.82%	5,456
Boone	37,404	47.10%	39,847	50.17%	2,171	2.73%	-2,443	-3.07%	79,422
Buchanan	18,660	53.15%	15,594	44.42%	852	2.43%	3,066	8.73%	35,106
Butler	12,248	72.52%	4,363	25.83%	278	1.65%	7,885	46.69%	16,889
Caldwell	2,721	65.30%	1,312	31.49%	134	3.21%	1,409	33.81%	4,167
Callaway	11,745	64.42%	6,071	33.30%	416	2.28%	5,674	31.12%	18,232
Camden	15,092	68.55%	6,458	29.33%	465	2.12%	8,634	39.22%	22,015
Cape Girardeau	25,370	70.81%	9,728	27.15%	731	2.04%	15,642	43.66%	35,829
Carroll	3,072	71.38%	1,154	26.81%	78	1.81%	1,918	44.57%	4,304
Carter	1,978	70.67%	754	26.94%	67	2.39%	1,224	43.73%	2,799
Cass	30,912	62.95%	17,044	34.71%	1,148	2.34%	13,868	28.24%	49,104
Cedar	4,376	72.39%	1,537	25.43%	132	2.18%	2,839	46.96%	6,045
Chariton	2,402	62.86%	1,339	35.04%	80	2.10%	1,063	27.82%	3,821
Christian	27,473	72.37%	9,813	25.85%	678	1.78%	17,660	46.52%	37,964
Clark	1,730	53.64%	1,398	43.35%	97	3.01%	332	10.29%	3,225
Clay	56,191	52.99%	47,310	44.61%	2,542	2.40%	8,881	8.38%	106,043
Clinton	5,931	60.15%	3,688	37.40%	242	2.45%	2,243	22.75%	9,861
Cole	24,490	65.85%	12,005	32.28%	695	1.87%	12,485	33.57%	37,190
Cooper	4,887	65.06%	2,474	32.94%	150	2.00%	2,413	32.12%	7,511
Crawford	6,434	67.17%	2,951	30.81%	194	2.02%	3,483	36.36%	9,579
Dade	2,895	74.31%	939	24.10%	62	1.59%	1,956	50.21%	3,896
Dallas	4,992	68.58%	2,122	29.15%	165	2.27%	2,870	39.43%	7,279
Daviess	2,290	65.04%	1,125	31.95%	106	3.01%	1,165	33.09%	3,521
DeKalb	3,056	70.25%	1,194	27.45%	100	2.30%	1,862	42.80%	4,350
Dent	4,883	73.20%	1,585	23.76%	203	3.04%	3,298	49.44%	6,671
Douglas	4,649	70.90%	1,710	26.08%	198	3.02%	2,939	44.82%	6,557
Dunklin	6,850	64.31%	3,636	34.14%	165	1.55%	3,214	30.17%	10,651
Franklin	29,396	62.64%	16,347	34.83%	1,186	2.53%	13,049	27.81%	46,929
Gasconade	4,895	68.62%	2,099	29.42%	140	1.96%	2,796	39.20%	7,134
Gentry	1,988	66.29%	937	31.24%	74	2.47%	1,051	35.05%	2,999
Greene	76,900	60.83%	46,219	36.56%	3,300	2.61%	30,681	24.27%	126,419
Grundy	3,030	69.27%	1,212	27.71%	132	3.02%	1,818	41.56%	4,374
Harrison	2,624	71.01%	984	26.63%	87	2.36%	1,640	44.38%	3,695
Henry	6,229	61.18%	3,606	35.42%	347	3.40%	2,623	25.76%	10,182
Hickory	2,835	60.58%	1,733	37.03%	112	2.39%	1,102	23.55%	4,680
Holt	1,725	74.68%	551	23.85%	34	1.47%	1,174	50.83%	2,310
Howard	3,017	61.99%	1,723	35.40%	127	2.61%	1,294	26.59%	4,867
Howell	11,544	70.62%	4,395	26.89%	407	2.49%	7,149	43.73%	16,346
Iron	2,252	55.87%	1,669	41.40%	110	2.73%	583	14.47%	4,031
Jackson	122,708	39.32%	183,953	58.95%	5,400	1.73%	-61,245	-19.63%	312,061
Jasper	31,349	69.33%	12,809	28.33%	1,060	2.34%	18,540	41.00%	45,218
Jefferson	53,978	55.07%	41,564	42.40%	2,482	2.53%	12,414	12.67%	98,024
Johnson	12,763	60.72%	7,667	36.47%	591	2.81%	5,096	24.25%	21,021
Knox	1,205	61.57%	698	35.67%	54	2.76%	507	25.90%	1,957
Laclede	10,934	70.84%	4,093	26.52%	408	2.64%	6,841	44.32%	15,435
Lafayette	9,803	61.79%	5,655	35.64%	408	2.57%	4,148	26.15%	15,866
Lawrence	11,421	72.49%	4,017	25.50%	317	2.01%	7,404	46.99%	15,755
Lewis	2,677	62.56%	1,508	35.24%	94	2.20%	1,169	27.32%	4,279
Lincoln	14,332	62.93%	7,734	33.96%	710	3.11%	6,598	28.97%	22,776
Linn	3,344	60.25%	2,041	36.77%	165	2.98%	1,303	23.48%	5,550
Livingston	4,006	66.17%	1,906	31.48%	142	2.35%	2,100	34.69%	6,054
Macon	4,701	65.66%	2,309	32.25%	150	2.09%	2,392	33.41%	7,160
Madison	3,227	65.46%	1,588	32.21%	115	2.33%	1,639	33.25%	4,930
Maries	3,165	69.74%	1,299	28.62%	74	1.64%	1,866	41.12%	4,538
Marion	7,923	65.17%	4,031	33.16%	204	1.67%	3,892	32.01%	12,158
McDonald	5,694	72.84%	1,920	24.56%	203	2.60%	3,774	48.28%	7,817
Mercer	1,255	75.83%	353	21.33%	47	2.84%	902	54.50%	1,655
Miller	8,099	73.31%	2,651	24.00%	298	2.69%	5,448	49.31%	11,048
Mississippi	2,997	60.91%	1,858	37.76%	65	1.33%	1,139	23.15%	4,920
Moniteau	4,704	73.01%	1,608	24.96%	131	2.03%	3,096	48.05%	6,443
Monroe	2,564	63.20%	1,398	34.46%	95	2.34%	1,166	28.74%	4,057
Montgomery	3,490	65.31%	1,740	32.56%	114	2.13%	1,750	32.75%	5,344
Morgan	5,733	65.99%	2,773	31.92%	182	2.09%	2,960	34.07%	8,688
New Madrid	4,284	59.09%	2,814	38.81%	152	2.10%	1,470	20.28%	7,250
Newton	18,181	72.17%	6,425	25.50%	587	2.33%	11,756	46.67%	25,193
Nodaway	5,593	62.31%	3,172	35.34%	211	2.35%	2,421	26.97%	8,976
Oregon	2,886	65.28%	1,419	32.10%	116	2.62%	1,467	33.18%	4,421
Osage	5,329	77.02%	1,473	21.29%	117	1.69%	3,856	55.73%	6,919
Ozark	3,080	69.17%	1,261	28.32%	112	2.51%	1,819	40.85%	4,453
Pemiscot	3,598	56.80%	2,671	42.16%	66	1.04%	927	14.64%	6,335
Perry	5,669	70.98%	2,184	27.34%	134	1.68%	3,485	43.64%	7,987
Pettis	10,842	63.13%	5,904	34.38%	429	2.49%	4,938	28.75%	17,175
Phelps	11,895	65.05%	5,798	31.71%	593	3.24%	6,097	33.34%	18,286
Pike	4,577	62.52%	2,582	35.27%	162	2.21%	1,995	27.25%	7,321
Platte	25,618	56.04%	19,175	41.95%	917	2.01%	6,443	14.09%	45,710
Polk	9,252	70.52%	3,580	27.29%	287	2.19%	5,672	43.23%	13,119
Pulaski	9,092	67.00%	4,199	30.94%	280	2.06%	4,893	36.06%	13,571
Putnam	1,673	72.46%	587	25.42%	49	2.12%	1,086	47.04%	2,309
Ralls	3,231	64.16%	1,736	34.47%	69	1.37%	1,495	29.69%	5,036
Randolph	6,667	66.84%	3,031	30.39%	277	2.77%	3,636	36.45%	9,975
Ray	5,815	56.09%	4,275	41.24%	277	2.67%	1,540	14.85%	10,367
Reynolds	1,931	60.31%	1,157	36.13%	114	3.56%	774	24.18%	3,202
Ripley	3,743	71.12%	1,396	26.52%	124	2.36%	2,347	44.60%	5,263
Saline	5,104	56.04%	3,790	41.61%	214	2.35%	1,314	14.43%	9,108
Schuyler	1,174	60.55%	697	35.95%	68	3.50%	477	24.60%	1,939
Scotland	1,246	64.36%	643	33.21%	47	2.43%	603	31.15%	1,936
Scott	11,623	68.37%	5,122	30.13%	254	1.50%	6,501	38.24%	16,999
Shannon	2,262	61.27%	1,302	35.27%	128	3.46%	960	26.00%	3,692
Shelby	2,188	67.70%	966	29.89%	78	2.41%	1,222	37.81%	3,232
St. Charles	110,784	59.44%	71,838	38.55%	3,744	2.01%	38,946	20.89%	186,366
St. Clair	3,019	65.26%	1,460	31.56%	147	3.18%	1,559	33.70%	4,626
St. Francois	13,248	58.35%	8,829	38.89%	628	2.76%	4,419	19.46%	22,705
St. Louis	224,742	42.39%	297,097	56.04%	8,277	1.57%	-72,355	-13.65%	530,116
St. Louis City	22,943	15.93%	118,780	82.45%	2,343	1.62%	-95,837	-66.52%	144,066
Ste. Genevieve	4,055	50.25%	3,813	47.25%	202	2.50%	242	3.00%	8,070
Stoddard	9,496	73.81%	3,153	24.51%	217	1.68%	6,343	49.30%	12,866
Stone	11,787	73.45%	3,923	24.45%	337	2.10%	7,864	49.00%	16,047
Sullivan	1,610	62.04%	908	34.99%	77	2.97%	702	27.05%	2,595
Taney	15,746	72.44%	5,479	25.20%	513	2.36%	10,267	47.24%	21,738
Texas	7,618	70.77%	2,871	26.67%	275	2.56%	4,747	44.10%	10,764
Vernon	5,758	67.57%	2,580	30.28%	183	2.15%	3,178	37.29%	8,521
Warren	9,150	62.35%	5,219	35.56%	307	2.09%	3,931	26.79%	14,676
Washington	5,071	58.32%	3,417	39.30%	207	2.38%	1,654	19.02%	8,695
Wayne	3,790	66.26%	1,813	31.70%	117	2.04%	1,977	34.56%	5,720
Webster	10,708	69.10%	4,409	28.45%	379	2.45%	6,299	40.65%	15,496
Worth	664	63.36%	341	32.54%	43	4.10%	323	30.82%	1,048
Wright	5,830	73.29%	1,953	24.55%	172	2.16%	3,877	48.74%	7,955
Totals	1,482,440	53.64%	1,223,796	44.28%	57,453	2.08%	258,644	9.36%	2,763,689

Counties that flipped from Democratic to Republican

- Buchanan (largest city: St. Joseph)
- Iron (largest city: Ironton)
- Jefferson (largest city: Arnold)
- Sainte Genevieve (largest city: Ste. Genevieve)
- Washington (largest city: Potosi)

==== By congressional district ====
Romney won six of eight congressional districts.

District	Romney	Obama	Representative
1st	18.9%	79.87%	Lacy Clay
2nd	57.14%	41.44%	Ann Wagner
3rd	62%	36%	Blaine Luetkemeyer
4th	61.24%	36.41%	Vicky Hartzler
5th	39.36%	58.9%	Emanuel Cleaver
6th	60%	37.9%	Sam Graves
7th	67.56%	30.34%	Billy Long
8th	65.88%	32%	Jo Ann Emerson

== Analysis ==
As of the 2024 presidential election, this is the last time Missouri was decided by a single-digit margin. In addition, this was the first time since 1900 that Missouri was not carried by the victor of the presidential contest two times consecutively, after Obama had failed to win the state in 2008, as well as the first time since 1900 when the overall loser of the presidential election won the state by a margin larger than 1% of the statewide vote. Thus, the 2012 election seemingly marked the end of Missouri's swing state status. Obama is the only president of either party since William McKinley to win two terms in the White House without carrying Missouri either time. This election also remains the only time in history that a Democrat was elected twice to the presidency without ever carrying Missouri.

Obama became the first Democrat since 1960 to win without Buchanan, Iron, and Washington counties; the first since 1916 without Jefferson County; and the first since 1944 without St. Genevieve County.

Obama carried only three counties and the City of St. Louis. He carried Boone County, home to Columbia and the University of Missouri; Jackson County, where most of Kansas City is located; and St. Louis County, home to many St. Louis suburbs. While Obama won many counties in the St. Louis metropolitan area in 2008 such as Iron, Jefferson, Ste. Genevieve, and Washington counties, the Republicans won them in this election, all but Ste. Genevieve by comfortable margins.

== See also ==
- 2012 Democratic Party presidential primaries
- 2012 Republican Party presidential debates and forums
- 2012 Republican Party presidential primaries
- Results of the 2012 Republican Party presidential primaries
- Missouri Republican Party
- Missouri Bellwether
- United States presidential elections in Missouri
