= 2020 United States presidential election in Missouri =

- November 3, 2020
- Turnout: 70.07% (▲3.51 pp)

Nominee	Donald Trump	Joe Biden
Party	Republican	Democratic
Home state	Florida	Delaware
Running mate	Mike Pence	Kamala Harris
Electoral vote	10	0
Popular vote	1,718,736	1,253,014
Percentage	56.80%	41.41%

Trump
40–50%
50–60%
60–70%
70–80%
80–90%
90–100%
Biden
40–50%
50–60%
60–70%
70–80%
80–90%
90–100%
Tie/No Data
President before election
Donald Trump
Republican
Elected President
Joe Biden
Democratic

The 2020 United States presidential election in Missouri was held on Tuesday, November 3, 2020, as part of the 2020 United States presidential election in which all 50 states plus the District of Columbia participated. Missouri voters chose electors to represent them in the Electoral College via a popular vote, pitting the Republican Party's nominee, incumbent President Donald Trump of Florida, and running mate Vice President Mike Pence of Indiana against Democratic Party nominee, former Vice President Joe Biden of Delaware, and his running mate Senator Kamala Harris of California. Missouri had 10 electoral votes in the Electoral College.

Trump won Missouri again by a 15.4% margin. This was 3.1% lower than his 2016 margin, but still a better performance in the state than that of any other Republican nominee since Ronald Reagan in 1984. Prior to the election, most news organizations considered this a state Trump would win; during the 21st century Missouri has shifted away from being one of the most notable bellwether states towards becoming a reliably red state. Trump became the first incumbent president since Grover Cleveland in 1888 to win Missouri and lose re-election and the first-ever Republican incumbent to do so. This is also the first time since 1916 (and only the second time ever) that Missouri has voted more Republican than neighboring Kansas.

In this election Missouri voted nearly 20% more Republican than the nation as a whole.

== Primary elections ==
=== Democratic primary ===
Results by county Biden—40–50% Biden—50–60% Biden—60–70% Biden—70–80%

2020 Missouri Democratic presidential primary
Candidate	Votes	%	Delegates
Joe Biden	400,347	60.10	44
Bernie Sanders	230,374	34.59	24
Michael Bloomberg (withdrawn)	9,866	1.48	
Elizabeth Warren (withdrawn)	8,156	1.22	
Tulsi Gabbard	4,887	0.73	
Pete Buttigieg (withdrawn)	3,309	0.50	
Amy Klobuchar (withdrawn)	2,682	0.40	
Andrew Yang (withdrawn)	953	0.14	
Cory Booker (withdrawn)	651	0.10	
Tom Steyer (withdrawn)	584	0.09	
Michael Bennet (withdrawn)	206	0.03	
Marianne Williamson (withdrawn)	170	0.03	
John Delaney (withdrawn)	159	0.02	
Julian Castro (withdrawn)	103	0.02	
Henry Hewes	94	0.01	
Deval Patrick (withdrawn)	52	0.01	
Other candidates	1,025	0.15	
Uncommitted	2,494	0.37	
Total	666,112	100%	68

=== Republican primary ===
2020 Missouri Republican presidential primary
Candidate	Votes	%	Estimated delegates
Donald Trump (incumbent)	301,953	96.8%	54
Uncommitted	4,216	1.4%	0
Bill Weld	2,171	0.7%	0
Joe Walsh (withdrawn)	2,015	0.6%	0
Bob Ely	844	0.3%	0
Matthew John Matern	594	0.2%	0
Total	311,793	100%	54

=== Libertarian primary ===
2020 Missouri Libertarian presidential primary
- March 10, 2020
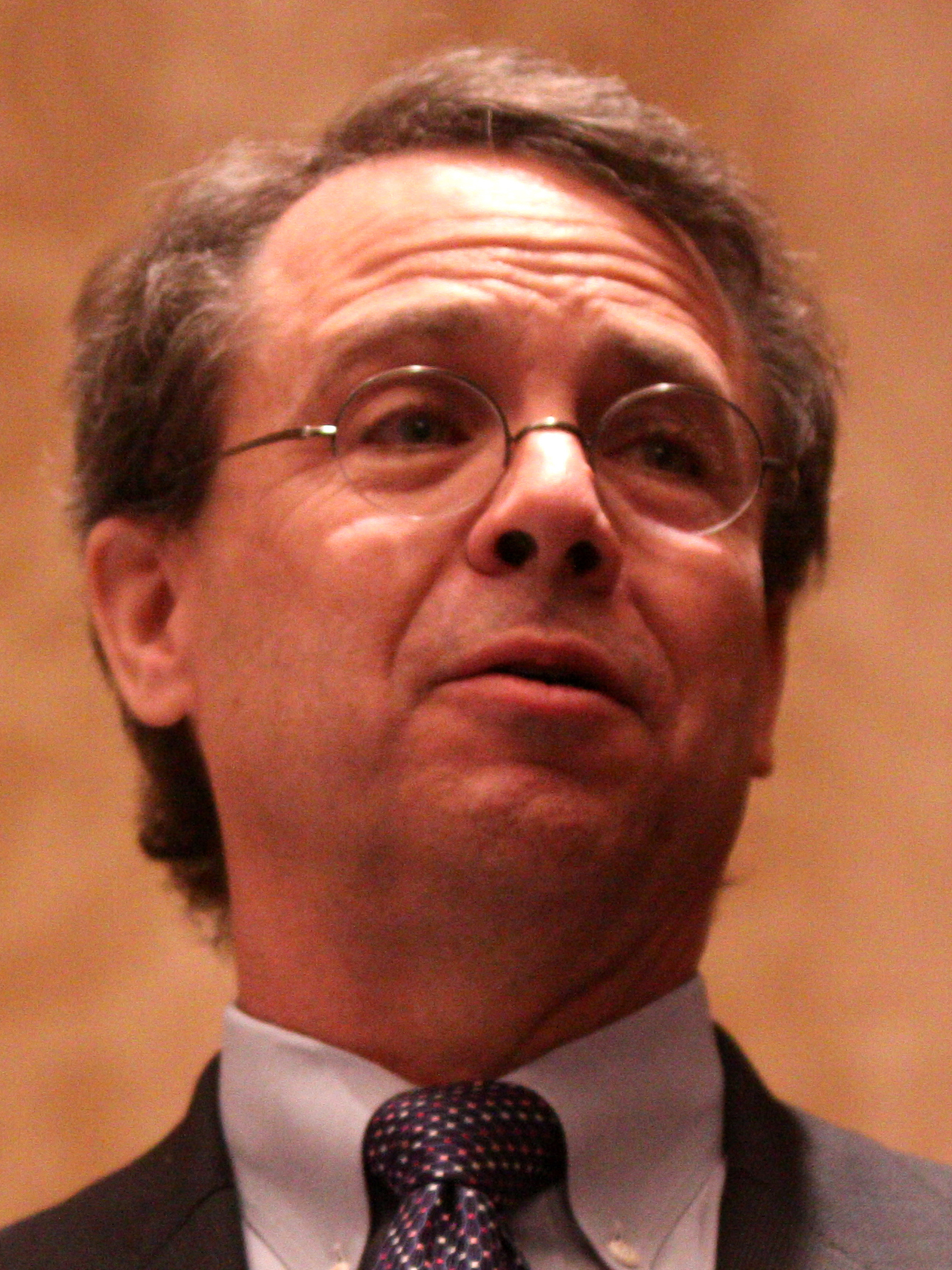

Candidate	Jacob Hornberger	Uncommitted
Home state	Virginia	N/A
Popular vote	1,683	573
Percentage	74.6%	25.4%
Election results by county
Jacob Hornberger Uncommitted	Tie No votes

Missouri Libertarian presidential primary, March 10, 2020
Candidate	Votes	Percentage
Jacob Hornberger	1,683	74.6%
Uncommitted	573	25.4%
Total	2,256	100%

=== Green primary ===
2020 Missouri Green presidential primaries
Party	Candidate	Votes	%
Green	Howie Hawkins	2,733	76.93%
Green	Dario Hunter	639	26.87%
Green	David Rolde	214	10.99%
Total votes		3,586	100%

== General election ==
=== Predictions ===
Source	Ranking	As of
The Cook Political Report	Likely R	September 10, 2020
Inside Elections	Lean R	September 4, 2020
Sabato's Crystal Ball	Likely R	July 14, 2020
Politico	Safe R	September 8, 2020
RCP	Lean R	August 3, 2020
Niskanen	Safe R	July 26, 2020
CNN	Safe R	August 3, 2020
The Economist	Likely R	September 2, 2020
CBS News	Likely R	August 16, 2020
270towin	Likely R	August 2, 2020
ABC News	Lean R	July 31, 2020
NPR	Likely R	August 3, 2020
NBC News	Likely R	August 6, 2020
538	Likely R	September 9, 2020

=== Polling ===
View source data.

Aggregate polls

Source of poll aggregation	Dates administered	Dates updated	Joe Biden Democratic	Donald Trump Republican	Other/ Undecided (Note: Calculated by taking the difference of 100% and all other candidates combined.)	Margin
270 to Win	October 13 – November 2, 2020	November 3, 2020	43.7%	51.3%	5.0%	Trump +7.6
FiveThirtyEight	until November 2, 2020	November 3, 2020	43.6%	51.6%	4.8%	Trump +8.0
Average			43.7%	51.5%	4.9%	Trump +7.8

Polls

Poll source	Date(s) administered	Sample size (Note: Key: A – all adults RV – registered voters LV – likely voters V – unclear)	Margin of error	Donald Trump Republican	Joe Biden Democratic	Jo Jorgensen Libertarian	Howie Hawkins Green	Other	Undecided
SurveyMonkey/Axios	Oct 20 – Nov 2, 2020	2,926 (LV)	± 2.5%	54% (Note: Overlapping sample with the previous SurveyMonkey/Axios poll, but more information available regarding sample size)	44%	-	-	–	–
Swayable	Oct 23 – Nov 1, 2020	487 (LV)	± 6.6%	55%	43%	2%	0%	–	–
Morning Consult	Oct 22–31, 2020	1,109 (LV)	± 3%	52%	43%	-	-	–	–
Remington Research Group/Missouri Scout	Oct 28–29, 2020	1,010 (LV)	± 3%	50%	45%	2%	1%	–	2%
SurveyMonkey/Axios	Oct 1–28, 2020	4,759 (LV)	–	53%	45%	-	-	–	–
Remington Research Group/Missouri Scout	Oct 14–15, 2020	1,010 (LV)	± 3%	51%	45%	1%	1%	-	2%
YouGov/SLU	Sep 24 – Oct 7, 2020	931 (LV)	± 3.9%	52%	43%	-	-	3%	2%
Garin-Hart-Yang/Galloway for Missouri (Note: Poll sponsored by Galloway's campaign for governor)	Sep 28 – Oct 2, 2020	600 (LV)	± 4.1%	50%	48%	-	-	–	–
Remington Research Group/Missouri Scout	Sep 30 – Oct 1, 2020	980 (LV)	± 3%	51%	46%	-	-	–	3%
SurveyMonkey/Axios	Sep 1–30, 2020	2,157 (LV)	–	53%	45%	-	-	–	2%
Remington Research Group/Missouri Scout	Sep 16–17, 2020	1,046 (LV)	± 3%	53%	45%	-	-	–	2%
We Ask America	Sep 1–3, 2020	500 (LV)	± 4.38%	49%	44%	-	-	5% (Note: "Someone else" with 5%)	2%
SurveyMonkey/Axios	Aug 1–31, 2020	1,863 (LV)	–	54%	44%	-	-	–	2%
Trafalgar Group (R)	Aug 26–28, 2020	1,015 (LV)	± 2.99%	52%	41%	3%	-	1% (Note: "Another Party Candidate" with 1%)	3%
SurveyMonkey/Axios	Jul 1–31, 2020	2,261 (LV)	–	54%	44%	-	-	–	2%
YouGov/Saint Louis University	Jun 23 – Jul 1, 2020	900 (LV)	± 3.95%	50%	43%	-	-	4%	4%
SurveyMonkey/Axios	Jun 8–30, 2020	868 (LV)	–	51%	47%	-	-	–	1%
Garin-Hart-Yang/Galloway for Governor/Missouri Scout	Jun 16–22, 2020	800 (LV)	± 3.5%	46%	48%	-	-	–	–
Remington Research Group/Missouri Scout	Jun 10–11, 2020	1,152 (LV)	± 2.9%	51%	43%	-	-	–	6%
We Ask America	May 26–27, 2020	500 (LV)	± 4.38%	48%	44%	-	-	3% (Note: "Someone else" with 3%)	5%
Remington Research Group/Missouri Scout	Feb 26–27, 2020	1,050 (LV)	–	53%	42%	-	-	–	5%
American Viewpoint/Uniting Missouri (Note: Uniting Missouri is a PAC supporting Governor Mike Parson (R) in the 2020 Missouri gubernatorial election.)	Jan 20–22, 2020	1,200 (LV)	–	50%	43%	-	-	–	7%
Remington Research Group	Sep 18–19, 2019	1,046 (LV)	± 3.0%	53%	42%	-	-	–	5%
Remington Research Group	Apr 10–11, 2019	955 (LV)	± 3.3%	51%	43%	-	-	–	6%

Former candidates

Donald Trump vs. Michael Bloomberg

Poll source	Date(s) administered	Sample size	Margin of error	Donald Trump (R)	Michael Bloomberg (D)	Undecided
Remington Research Group/Missouri Scout	Feb 26–27, 2020	1,050 (LV)	–	51%	39%	10%

Donald Trump vs. Pete Buttigieg

Poll source	Date(s) administered	Sample size	Margin of error	Donald Trump (R)	Pete Buttigieg (D)	Undecided
Remington Research Group/Missouri Scout	Feb 26–27, 2020	1,050 (LV)	–	52%	37%	11%

Donald Trump vs. Kamala Harris

Poll source	Date(s) administered	Sample size	Margin of error	Donald Trump (R)	Kamala Harris (D)	Undecided
Remington Research Group	Apr 10–11, 2019	955 (LV)	± 3.3%	52%	36%	12%

Donald Trump vs. Beto O'Rourke

Poll source	Date(s) administered	Sample size	Margin of error	Donald Trump (R)	Beto O'Rourke (D)	Undecided
Remington Research Group	Apr 10–11, 2019	955 (LV)	± 3.3%	51%	38%	11%

Donald Trump vs. Bernie Sanders

Poll source	Date(s) administered	Sample size	Margin of error	Donald Trump (R)	Bernie Sanders (D)	Undecided
Remington Research Group/Missouri Scout	Feb 26–27, 2020	1,050 (LV)	–	52%	37%	11%
Remington Research Group	Sep 18–19, 2019	1,046 (LV)	± 3.0%	54%	37%	9%
Remington Research Group	Apr 10–11, 2019	955 (LV)	± 3.3%	51%	39%	10%

Donald Trump vs. Elizabeth Warren

Poll source	Date(s) administered	Sample size	Margin of error	Donald Trump (R)	Elizabeth Warren (D)	Undecided
Remington Research Group/Missouri Scout	Feb 26–27, 2020	1,050 (LV)	–	53%	35%	12%
American Viewpoint/Uniting Missouri	Jan 20–22, 2020	1,200 (LV)	–	51%	41%	8%
Remington Research Group	Sep 18–19, 2019	1,046 (LV)	± 3.0%	54%	40%	6%
Zogby Analytics	Aug 17–23, 2017	604 (LV)	± 4.0%	40%	46%	14%

Hypothetical polling

Poll source	Date(s) administered	Sample size	Margin of error	Donald Trump (R)	Generic Opponent	Undecided
Remington Research Group/Missouri Scout	March 6–7, 2019	984(LV)	± 3.3%	53%	46%	2%

=== Results ===
2020 United States presidential election in Missouri
Party	Candidate	Votes	%	±%
Republican	Donald Trump Mike Pence	1,718,736	56.80	+0.02
Democratic	Joe Biden Kamala Harris	1,253,014	41.41	+3.27
Libertarian	Jo Jorgensen Spike Cohen	41,205	1.36	−2.11
Green	Howie Hawkins Angela Walker	8,283	0.27	−0.63
Constitution	Don Blankenship William Mohr	3,919	0.13	−0.34
Write-in		805	0.03	N/A
Total votes		3,025,962	100.00	N/A

==== By county ====
County	Donald Trump Republican		Joe Biden Democratic		Various candidates Other parties		Margin		Total
County	#	%	#	%	#	%	#	%	Total
Adair	6,413	62.05%	3,710	35.89%	213	2.06%	2,703	26.15%	10,336
Andrew	7,255	74.39%	2,351	24.11%	146	1.50%	4,904	50.29%	9,752
Atchison	2,199	78.14%	564	20.04%	51	1.81%	1,635	58.10%	2,814
Audrain	7,732	72.56%	2,704	25.38%	220	2.06%	5,028	47.18%	10,656
Barry	12,425	79.66%	2,948	18.90%	225	1.44%	9,477	60.76%	15,598
Barton	5,168	85.04%	844	13.89%	65	1.07%	4,324	71.15%	6,077
Bates	6,597	78.39%	1,672	19.87%	147	1.75%	4,925	58.52%	8,416
Benton	8,109	77.41%	2,180	20.81%	187	1.79%	5,929	56.60%	10,476
Bollinger	5,167	86.36%	750	12.54%	66	1.10%	4,417	73.83%	5,983
Boone	38,646	42.39%	50,064	54.91%	2,458	2.70%	-11,418	-12.52%	91,168
Buchanan	22,450	61.34%	13,445	36.74%	703	1.92%	9,005	24.61%	36,598
Butler	14,602	80.49%	3,301	18.20%	238	1.31%	11,301	62.30%	18,141
Caldwell	3,725	79.56%	897	19.16%	60	1.28%	2,828	60.40%	4,682
Callaway	14,815	70.07%	5,870	27.76%	459	2.17%	8,945	42.31%	21,144
Camden	18,850	75.97%	5,652	22.78%	310	1.25%	13,198	53.19%	24,812
Cape Girardeau	28,907	71.68%	10,760	26.68%	661	1.64%	18,147	45.00%	40,328
Carroll	3,706	81.77%	786	17.34%	40	0.88%	2,920	64.43%	4,532
Carter	2,451	84.60%	418	14.43%	28	0.97%	2,033	70.18%	2,897
Cass	37,197	64.79%	19,052	33.19%	1,159	2.02%	18,145	31.61%	57,408
Cedar	5,788	82.17%	1,145	16.25%	111	1.58%	4,643	65.91%	7,044
Chariton	3,111	76.31%	916	22.47%	50	1.23%	2,195	53.84%	4,077
Christian	34,920	74.55%	11,131	23.76%	788	1.68%	23,789	50.79%	46,839
Clark	2,672	78.73%	678	19.98%	44	1.30%	1,994	58.75%	3,394
Clay	64,605	51.04%	59,400	46.93%	2,564	2.03%	5,205	4.11%	126,569
Clinton	7,799	71.63%	2,896	26.60%	193	1.77%	4,903	45.03%	10,888
Cole	26,086	65.99%	12,694	32.11%	749	1.89%	13,392	33.88%	39,529
Cooper	6,272	72.15%	2,249	25.87%	172	1.98%	4,023	46.28%	8,693
Crawford	8,725	79.51%	2,113	19.26%	135	1.23%	6,612	60.26%	10,973
Dade	3,414	82.88%	656	15.93%	49	1.19%	2,758	66.96%	4,119
Dallas	6,619	81.68%	1,380	17.03%	105	1.30%	5,239	64.65%	8,104
Daviess	3,102	79.31%	746	19.07%	63	1.61%	2,356	60.24%	3,911
DeKalb	3,828	79.04%	930	19.20%	85	1.76%	2,898	59.84%	4,843
Dent	5,987	83.83%	1,056	14.79%	99	1.39%	4,931	69.04%	7,142
Douglas	5,898	84.26%	1,016	14.51%	86	1.23%	4,882	69.74%	7,000
Dunklin	8,135	78.08%	2,200	21.12%	84	0.81%	5,935	56.96%	10,419
Franklin	38,058	70.89%	14,569	27.14%	1,058	1.97%	23,489	43.75%	53,685
Gasconade	6,222	78.53%	1,601	20.21%	100	1.26%	4,621	58.32%	7,923
Gentry	2,581	79.73%	613	18.94%	43	1.33%	1,968	60.80%	3,237
Greene	83,630	58.98%	55,068	38.83%	3,102	2.19%	28,562	20.14%	141,800
Grundy	3,585	80.80%	799	18.01%	53	1.19%	2,786	62.79%	4,437
Harrison	3,198	83.59%	597	15.60%	31	0.81%	2,601	67.98%	3,826
Henry	8,027	74.41%	2,619	24.28%	142	1.32%	5,408	50.13%	10,788
Hickory	3,966	78.07%	1,056	20.79%	58	1.14%	2,910	57.28%	5,080
Holt	1,976	84.34%	338	14.43%	29	1.24%	1,638	69.91%	2,343
Howard	3,553	69.78%	1,413	27.75%	126	2.47%	2,140	42.03%	5,092
Howell	15,181	81.40%	3,218	17.25%	251	1.35%	11,963	64.14%	18,650
Iron	3,596	78.31%	945	20.58%	51	1.11%	2,651	57.73%	4,592
Jackson	126,535	37.99%	199,842	60.00%	6,686	2.01%	-73,307	-22.01%	333,063
Jasper	37,728	72.07%	13,549	25.88%	1,075	2.05%	24,179	46.19%	52,352
Jefferson	77,046	66.03%	37,523	32.16%	2,119	1.82%	39,523	33.87%	116,688
Johnson	15,489	66.99%	6,974	30.16%	660	2.85%	8,515	36.82%	23,123
Knox	1,486	80.15%	340	18.34%	28	1.51%	1,146	61.81%	1,854
Laclede	13,762	81.95%	2,780	16.55%	251	1.49%	10,982	65.40%	16,793
Lafayette	12,273	71.96%	4,472	26.22%	310	1.82%	7,801	45.74%	17,055
Lawrence	14,426	80.57%	3,214	17.95%	265	1.48%	11,212	62.62%	17,905
Lewis	3,553	77.09%	984	21.35%	72	1.56%	2,569	55.74%	4,609
Lincoln	21,848	75.29%	6,607	22.77%	563	1.94%	15,241	52.52%	29,018
Linn	4,363	76.20%	1,275	22.27%	88	1.54%	3,088	53.93%	5,726
Livingston	5,267	77.94%	1,410	20.86%	81	1.20%	3,857	57.07%	6,758
Macon	6,076	77.54%	1,662	21.21%	98	1.25%	4,414	56.33%	7,836
Madison	4,584	80.76%	1,019	17.95%	73	1.29%	3,565	62.81%	5,676
Maries	3,892	81.58%	814	17.06%	65	1.36%	3,078	64.51%	4,771
Marion	9,915	74.28%	3,202	23.99%	231	1.73%	6,713	50.29%	13,348
McDonald	7,465	82.46%	1,439	15.90%	149	1.65%	6,026	66.56%	9,053
Mercer	1,541	86.62%	222	12.48%	16	0.90%	1,319	74.14%	1,779
Miller	10,176	82.18%	2,038	16.46%	168	1.36%	8,138	65.72%	12,382
Mississippi	3,537	74.37%	1,178	24.77%	41	0.86%	2,359	49.60%	4,756
Moniteau	5,744	80.26%	1,308	18.28%	105	1.47%	4,436	61.98%	7,157
Monroe	3,477	77.56%	936	20.88%	70	1.56%	2,541	56.68%	4,483
Montgomery	4,465	77.36%	1,208	20.93%	99	1.72%	3,257	56.43%	5,772
Morgan	7,442	78.44%	1,924	20.28%	121	1.28%	5,518	58.16%	9,487
New Madrid	5,447	75.13%	1,748	24.11%	55	0.76%	3,699	51.02%	7,250
Newton	22,120	77.87%	5,818	20.48%	467	1.64%	16,302	57.39%	28,405
Nodaway	6,865	69.39%	2,853	28.84%	175	1.77%	4,012	40.55%	9,893
Oregon	3,847	81.18%	823	17.37%	69	1.46%	3,024	63.81%	4,739
Osage	6,425	85.22%	1,037	13.76%	77	1.02%	5,388	71.47%	7,539
Ozark	4,064	83.55%	752	15.46%	48	0.99%	3,312	68.09%	4,864
Pemiscot	4,120	71.84%	1,560	27.20%	55	0.96%	2,560	44.64%	5,735
Perry	7,657	81.05%	1,664	17.61%	126	1.33%	5,993	63.44%	9,447
Pettis	13,854	72.55%	4,783	25.05%	460	2.41%	9,071	47.50%	19,097
Phelps	13,480	68.89%	5,637	28.81%	451	2.30%	7,843	40.08%	19,568
Pike	5,863	76.19%	1,717	22.31%	115	1.49%	4,146	53.88%	7,695
Platte	28,917	50.49%	27,179	47.46%	1,174	2.05%	1,738	3.03%	57,270
Polk	11,850	78.66%	2,885	19.15%	329	2.18%	8,965	59.51%	15,064
Pulaski	10,329	71.66%	3,740	25.95%	345	2.39%	6,589	45.71%	14,414
Putnam	1,984	84.03%	361	15.29%	16	0.68%	1,623	68.74%	2,361
Ralls	4,396	77.64%	1,205	21.28%	61	1.08%	3,191	56.36%	5,662
Randolph	8,018	74.63%	2,485	23.13%	241	2.24%	5,533	51.50%	10,744
Ray	8,345	71.64%	3,109	26.69%	195	1.67%	5,236	44.95%	11,649
Reynolds	2,733	82.87%	529	16.04%	36	1.09%	2,204	66.83%	3,298
Ripley	4,839	84.64%	833	14.57%	45	0.79%	4,006	70.07%	5,717
Saline	6,451	67.77%	2,904	30.51%	164	1.72%	3,547	37.26%	9,519
Schuyler	1,606	80.18%	373	18.62%	24	1.20%	1,233	61.56%	2,003
Scotland	1,560	78.63%	388	19.56%	36	1.81%	1,172	59.07%	1,984
Scott	13,769	77.71%	3,753	21.18%	197	1.11%	10,016	56.53%	17,719
Shannon	3,165	81.03%	706	18.07%	35	0.90%	2,459	62.95%	3,906
Shelby	2,700	80.60%	592	17.67%	58	1.73%	2,108	62.93%	3,350
St. Charles	128,389	57.83%	89,530	40.33%	4,098	1.85%	38,859	17.50%	222,017
St. Clair	3,932	79.05%	988	19.86%	54	1.09%	2,944	59.19%	4,974
St. Francois	20,511	73.25%	7,044	25.16%	446	1.59%	13,467	48.09%	28,001
St. Louis City	21,474	16.04%	110,089	82.24%	2,304	1.72%	-88,615	-66.20%	133,867
St. Louis County	199,493	37.19%	328,151	61.17%	8,802	1.64%	-128,658	-23.98%	536,446
Ste. Genevieve	6,630	69.91%	2,713	28.61%	141	1.49%	3,917	41.30%	9,484
Stoddard	11,484	85.54%	1,819	13.55%	123	0.92%	9,665	71.99%	13,426
Stone	14,800	80.07%	3,506	18.97%	177	0.96%	11,294	61.10%	18,483
Sullivan	1,974	79.89%	478	19.34%	19	0.77%	1,496	60.54%	2,471
Taney	20,508	78.01%	5,339	20.31%	441	1.68%	15,169	57.70%	26,288
Texas	9,478	83.76%	1,716	15.17%	121	1.07%	7,762	68.60%	11,315
Vernon	7,155	77.90%	1,903	20.72%	127	1.38%	5,252	57.18%	9,185
Warren	13,222	71.96%	4,769	25.95%	384	2.09%	8,453	46.00%	18,375
Washington	8,047	80.66%	1,804	18.08%	125	1.25%	6,243	62.58%	9,976
Wayne	4,987	84.84%	845	14.38%	46	0.78%	4,142	70.47%	5,878
Webster	14,880	79.24%	3,573	19.03%	326	1.74%	11,307	60.21%	18,779
Worth	877	79.22%	215	19.42%	15	1.36%	662	59.80%	1,107
Wright	7,453	85.28%	1,168	13.37%	118	1.35%	6,285	71.92%	8,739
Totals	1,718,736	56.80%	1,253,014	41.41%	54,212	1.79%	465,722	15.39%	3,025,962

==== By congressional district ====
Trump won six of eight congressional districts, with the remaining two going to Biden.

District	Trump	Biden	Representative
1st	18.14%	80.27%	Lacy Clay (116th Congress)
1st	18.14%	80.27%	Cori Bush (117th Congress)
2nd	49.13%	49.20%	Ann Wagner
3rd	66.81%	31.36%	Blaine Luetkemeyer
4th	66.00%	31.93%	Vicky Hartzler
5th	39.49%	58.54%	Emanuel Cleaver
6th	63.59%	34.66%	Sam Graves
7th	70.02%	28.12%	Billy Long
8th	77.37%	21.28%	Jason Smith

== Analysis ==
A bellwether state for the bulk of the 20th century, Missouri has since come to vote reliably Republican in presidential elections. This has been attributed to a shift in Republican policy towards right-wing populism and social conservatism; the platform has found fertile ground in the state, which lies in the Bible Belt, with Trump carrying 86% of White, born-again/Evangelical Christians.

Biden won the same four jurisdictions that Barack Obama and Hillary Clinton did in 2012 and 2016, respectively: Jackson County, home to Kansas City; Boone County, home to the college town of Columbia; and St. Louis County, home to the suburbs of St. Louis, which he also won. Biden also improved Democratic margins in Platte and Clay counties, both suburbs of Kansas City; Platte was carried by Trump by only 3%, and Clay by 4%. In addition, the 61% of the vote that Biden won in St. Louis County was the best performance for a Democrat since Lyndon B. Johnson's 1964 landslide.

Per exit polls by the Associated Press, Trump's strength in Missouri came from voters who trusted him on economic policy: a 57% majority believed Trump was better able to handle international trade. With a hybrid industrial-service-agricultural economy, 63% of Missourian voters favored increasing taxes on goods imported to the U.S. from other countries, and these voters broke for Trump by 67%. As is the case in many Southern and border states, there was a stark racial divide in voting for this election: White Missourians supported Trump by 62%, while black Missourians supported Biden by 88%. Trump became the first-ever Republican presidential candidate to win Missouri by double digits twice.

In other elections, incumbent Republican Mike Parson easily defeated State Auditor Nicole Galloway by 16 points—outperforming Trump—in the governor's race, further testifying to the state's trend towards the GOP, and becoming the best performance for a Republican on the gubernatorial level since John Ashcroft's 1988 victory.

== See also ==
- United States presidential elections in Missouri
- 2020 United States presidential election
- 2020 Democratic Party presidential primaries
- 2020 Libertarian Party presidential primaries
- 2020 Green Party presidential primaries
- 2020 Republican Party presidential primaries
- 2020 United States elections

== Notes ==
Partisan clients
