= 1960 United States presidential election in Missouri =

- November 8, 1960

Nominee	John F. Kennedy	Richard Nixon
Party	Democratic	Republican
Home state	Massachusetts	California
Running mate	Lyndon B. Johnson	Henry Cabot Lodge Jr.
Electoral vote	13	0
Popular vote	972,201	962,221
Percentage	50.26%	49.74%
County results
Kennedy
50–60%
60–70%
70–80%
Nixon
50–60%
60–70%
70–80%
President before election
Dwight D. Eisenhower
Republican
Elected President
John F. Kennedy
Democratic

The 1960 United States presidential election in Missouri took place on November 8, 1960, as part of the 1960 United States presidential election. Voters chose 13 representatives, or electors, to the Electoral College, who voted for president and vice president.

In the nation's third-closest race, Missouri was won by Senator John F. Kennedy (D–Massachusetts), running with Senator Lyndon B. Johnson, with 50.26 percent of the popular vote against incumbent Vice President Richard Nixon (R–California), running with United States Ambassador to the United Nations Henry Cabot Lodge Jr., with 49.74 percent of the popular vote. As of the 2024 presidential election, this is the last election in which Osage County voted for a Democratic presidential candidate. It also remains the most recent election in which a Northern Democrat has carried Missouri. The only subsequent Democratic nominees to carry the state have been from the South (Lyndon B. Johnson of Texas, Jimmy Carter of Georgia, and Bill Clinton of neighboring Arkansas)--although Northern Democrat Barack Obama of neighboring Illinois came very close to winning it in 2008, losing it by a razor-thin margin of 0.13 points or fewer than 4,000 votes.

While Nixon made gains in the evangelical South of the state, where Kennedy's Catholicism was unpopular, Kennedy made up for it with gains in the suburban regions outside of St Louis. A 101,000-vote margin in Kennedy's favor in St. Louis was nearly 10 times Kennedy's statewide margin.

== Results ==
1960 United States presidential election in Missouri
Party	Candidate	Votes	%
Democratic	John F. Kennedy	972,201	50.26%
Republican	Richard Nixon	962,221	49.74%
Total votes		1,934,422	100%

=== Results by county ===
County	John F. Kennedy Democratic		Richard Nixon Republican		Margin		Total votes cast
County	#	%	#	%	#	%	Total votes cast
Adair	3,160	36.62%	5,469	63.38%	-2,309	-26.76%	8,629
Andrew	2,170	36.87%	3,716	63.13%	-1,546	-26.26%	5,886
Atchison	2,167	44.90%	2,659	55.10%	-492	-10.20%	4,826
Audrain	6,410	56.40%	4,955	43.60%	1,455	12.80%	11,365
Barry	3,919	36.88%	6,706	63.12%	-2,787	-26.24%	10,625
Barton	2,417	39.49%	3,703	60.51%	-1,286	-21.02%	6,120
Bates	3,906	41.84%	5,429	58.16%	-1,523	-16.32%	9,335
Benton	1,496	30.04%	3,484	69.96%	-1,988	-39.92%	4,980
Bollinger	1,935	40.14%	2,886	59.86%	-951	-19.72%	4,821
Boone	11,514	52.41%	10,453	47.59%	1,061	4.82%	21,967
Buchanan	19,348	47.43%	21,448	52.57%	-2,100	-5.14%	40,796
Butler	5,406	38.19%	8,751	61.81%	-3,345	-23.62%	14,157
Caldwell	1,736	35.79%	3,115	64.21%	-1,379	-28.42%	4,851
Callaway	5,344	56.86%	4,054	43.14%	1,290	13.72%	9,398
Camden	1,759	33.39%	3,509	66.61%	-1,750	-33.22%	5,268
Cape Girardeau	8,172	41.90%	11,331	58.10%	-3,159	-16.20%	19,503
Carroll	3,296	41.98%	4,555	58.02%	-1,259	-16.04%	7,851
Carter	683	39.43%	1,049	60.57%	-366	-21.14%	1,732
Cass	5,718	46.71%	6,523	53.29%	-805	-6.58%	12,241
Cedar	1,547	29.32%	3,730	70.68%	-2,183	-41.36%	5,277
Chariton	3,550	53.37%	3,102	46.63%	448	6.74%	6,652
Christian	1,622	25.96%	4,627	74.04%	-3,005	-48.08%	6,249
Clark	2,039	43.56%	2,642	56.44%	-603	-12.88%	4,681
Clay	17,318	47.74%	18,955	52.26%	-1,637	-4.52%	36,273
Clinton	3,167	48.29%	3,391	51.71%	-224	-3.42%	6,558
Cole	8,532	46.64%	9,763	53.36%	-1,231	-6.72%	18,295
Cooper	3,858	45.23%	4,672	54.77%	-814	-9.54%	8,530
Crawford	2,387	37.00%	4,065	63.00%	-1,678	-26.00%	6,452
Dade	1,217	28.95%	2,987	71.05%	-1,770	-42.10%	4,204
Dallas	1,482	29.62%	3,522	70.38%	-2,040	-40.76%	5,004
Daviess	2,220	41.03%	3,191	58.97%	-971	-17.94%	5,411
DeKalb	1,697	40.59%	2,484	59.41%	-787	-18.82%	4,181
Dent	2,593	44.67%	3,212	55.33%	-619	-10.66%	5,805
Douglas	1,014	21.92%	3,611	78.08%	-2,597	-56.16%	4,625
Dunklin	6,568	49.47%	6,708	50.53%	-140	-1.06%	13,276
Franklin	10,324	47.07%	11,610	52.93%	-1,286	-5.86%	21,934
Gasconade	1,651	25.38%	4,854	74.62%	-3,203	-49.24%	6,505
Gentry	2,439	45.79%	2,888	54.21%	-449	-8.42%	5,327
Greene	20,457	35.64%	36,943	64.36%	-16,486	-28.72%	57,400
Grundy	2,415	35.32%	4,422	64.68%	-2,007	-29.36%	6,837
Harrison	2,200	34.56%	4,166	65.44%	-1,966	-30.88%	6,366
Henry	4,601	43.35%	6,012	56.65%	-1,411	-13.30%	10,613
Hickory	615	24.60%	1,885	75.40%	-1,270	-50.80%	2,500
Holt	1,551	36.31%	2,720	63.69%	-1,169	-27.38%	4,271
Howard	3,302	61.41%	2,075	38.59%	1,227	22.82%	5,377
Howell	2,734	27.82%	7,095	72.18%	-4,361	-44.36%	9,829
Iron	1,851	46.59%	2,122	53.41%	-271	-6.82%	3,973
Jackson	142,869	53.62%	123,589	46.38%	19,280	7.24%	266,458
Jasper	14,962	40.70%	21,804	59.30%	-6,842	-18.60%	36,766
Jefferson	17,054	56.91%	12,910	43.09%	4,144	13.82%	29,964
Johnson	4,712	40.34%	6,970	59.66%	-2,258	-19.32%	11,682
Knox	1,796	48.94%	1,874	51.06%	-78	-2.12%	3,670
Laclede	3,156	35.22%	5,805	64.78%	-2,649	-29.56%	8,961
Lafayette	5,555	40.95%	8,011	59.05%	-2,456	-18.10%	13,566
Lawrence	4,483	34.78%	8,406	65.22%	-3,923	-30.44%	12,889
Lewis	2,726	51.57%	2,560	48.43%	166	3.14%	5,286
Lincoln	3,793	52.22%	3,471	47.78%	322	4.44%	7,264
Linn	4,534	47.13%	5,086	52.87%	-552	-5.74%	9,620
Livingston	3,795	42.93%	5,045	57.07%	-1,250	-14.14%	8,840
Macon	4,208	46.07%	4,925	53.93%	-717	-7.86%	9,133
Madison	1,874	38.77%	2,960	61.23%	-1,086	-22.46%	4,834
Maries	1,716	50.47%	1,684	49.53%	32	0.94%	3,400
Marion	6,758	51.24%	6,431	48.76%	327	2.48%	13,189
McDonald	2,496	38.69%	3,955	61.31%	-1,459	-22.62%	6,451
Mercer	1,146	32.74%	2,354	67.26%	-1,208	-34.52%	3,500
Miller	2,584	36.57%	4,482	63.43%	-1,898	-26.86%	7,066
Mississippi	3,855	59.45%	2,629	40.55%	1,226	18.90%	6,484
Moniteau	2,271	39.68%	3,453	60.32%	-1,182	-20.64%	5,724
Monroe	4,011	72.53%	1,519	27.47%	2,492	45.06%	5,530
Montgomery	2,804	44.81%	3,454	55.19%	-650	-10.38%	6,258
Morgan	1,979	37.93%	3,239	62.07%	-1,260	-24.14%	5,218
New Madrid	7,373	63.68%	4,205	36.32%	3,168	27.36%	11,578
Newton	5,678	38.66%	9,010	61.34%	-3,332	-22.68%	14,688
Nodaway	5,318	47.02%	5,993	52.98%	-675	-5.96%	11,311
Oregon	1,934	49.49%	1,974	50.51%	-40	-1.02%	3,908
Osage	2,900	51.99%	2,678	48.01%	222	3.98%	5,578
Ozark	721	21.74%	2,595	78.26%	-1,874	-56.52%	3,316
Pemiscot	7,312	62.09%	4,464	37.91%	2,848	24.18%	11,776
Perry	2,991	43.49%	3,886	56.51%	-895	-13.02%	6,877
Pettis	6,997	43.56%	9,066	56.44%	-2,069	-12.88%	16,063
Phelps	4,576	44.69%	5,663	55.31%	-1,087	-10.62%	10,239
Pike	4,096	51.23%	3,900	48.77%	196	2.46%	7,996
Platte	5,860	55.12%	4,771	44.88%	1,089	10.24%	10,631
Polk	2,440	33.48%	4,849	66.52%	-2,409	-33.04%	7,289
Pulaski	3,096	48.52%	3,285	51.48%	-189	-2.96%	6,381
Putnam	1,060	28.11%	2,711	71.89%	-1,651	-43.78%	3,771
Ralls	2,495	62.69%	1,485	37.31%	1,010	25.38%	3,980
Randolph	6,434	60.62%	4,180	39.38%	2,254	21.24%	10,614
Ray	4,565	56.31%	3,542	43.69%	1,023	12.62%	8,107
Reynolds	1,044	47.82%	1,139	52.18%	-95	-4.36%	2,183
Ripley	1,717	37.92%	2,811	62.08%	-1,094	-24.16%	4,528
St. Charles	11,890	52.20%	10,888	47.80%	1,002	4.40%	22,778
St. Clair	1,865	36.85%	3,196	63.15%	-1,331	-26.30%	5,061
St. Francois	7,205	41.56%	10,131	58.44%	-2,926	-16.88%	17,336
St. Louis	166,508	51.31%	157,992	48.69%	8,516	2.62%	324,500
St. Louis City	202,319	66.63%	101,331	33.37%	100,988	33.26%	303,650
Ste. Genevieve	3,211	62.14%	1,956	37.86%	1,255	24.28%	5,167
Saline	5,969	49.52%	6,085	50.48%	-116	-0.96%	12,054
Schuyler	1,361	44.96%	1,666	55.04%	-305	-10.08%	3,027
Scotland	1,884	49.80%	1,899	50.20%	-15	-0.40%	3,783
Scott	6,349	52.23%	5,807	47.77%	542	4.46%	12,156
Shannon	1,386	49.24%	1,429	50.76%	-43	-1.52%	2,815
Shelby	2,870	58.19%	2,062	41.81%	808	16.38%	4,932
Stoddard	5,317	45.51%	6,366	54.49%	-1,049	-8.98%	11,683
Stone	890	21.76%	3,201	78.24%	-2,311	-56.48%	4,091
Sullivan	2,504	43.88%	3,202	56.12%	-698	-12.24%	5,706
Taney	1,439	28.05%	3,692	71.95%	-2,253	-43.90%	5,131
Texas	3,606	40.68%	5,258	59.32%	-1,652	-18.64%	8,864
Vernon	4,186	43.73%	5,387	56.27%	-1,201	-12.54%	9,573
Warren	1,407	32.32%	2,946	67.68%	-1,539	-35.36%	4,353
Washington	2,649	43.53%	3,437	56.47%	-788	-12.94%	6,086
Wayne	2,152	41.22%	3,069	58.78%	-917	-17.56%	5,221
Webster	2,707	37.03%	4,603	62.97%	-1,896	-25.94%	7,310
Worth	1,323	49.40%	1,355	50.60%	-32	-1.20%	2,678
Wright	1,953	27.34%	5,191	72.66%	-3,238	-45.32%	7,144
Totals	972,201	50.26%	962,221	49.74%	9,980	0.52%	1,934,422

==== Counties that flipped from Democratic to Republican ====
- Carter
- Clay
- Dent
- Dunklin
- Iron
- Linn
- Oregon
- Reynolds
- Pulaski
- Schuyler
- Scotland
- Shannon
- Stoddard
- Texas
- Worth

==== Counties that flipped from Republican to Democratic ====
- Osage
- St. Charles
- St. Genevieve
- St. Louis

== See also ==
- United States presidential elections in Missouri
