= Missouri bellwether =

Former phenomenon in U.S. politics

Location of Missouri

The Missouri bellwether was a political phenomenon that noted that the state of Missouri voted for the winner in all but one U.S. presidential election from the 1904 election to the 2004 election. The one exception was the 1956 election. While by 2004 it had diverged from the national median political result, Missouri was a consistent swing state throughout the 20th century. Prior to the 2008 elections, Lincoln County, Missouri was said to be the bellwether county in a bellwether state.

== Political history ==
From 1904 to 2004, Missouri's electoral votes always went to the winner of the presidential race, with only one exception: in 1956, during the landslide re-election of President Dwight Eisenhower, Missouri went to Illinois Governor Adlai Stevenson. The state's accuracy in voting with the national consensus includes the highly competitive elections of 1960, 1976, and 2000.

In 2006, Missouri's bellwether status gained renewed attention because of the 2006 Senate race between incumbent Republican Senator Jim Talent and Democratic State Auditor Claire McCaskill, which was considered vital to which party controls Congress. Additionally, Missouri had a ballot measure, Missouri Amendment Two, regarding stem cell research that drew national attention as an indicator of mainstream sentiment towards this controversial issue. On Election Day 2006, both McCaskill and Amendment 2 narrowly received majority support among Missouri voters. The victories of McCaskill and five other Democratic colleagues allowed their party to regain power in the U.S. Senate. Missouri was again the center of much media attention in 2012, after Rep. Todd Akin (R, MO-2) made controversial remarks regarding what he called "legitimate rape." McCaskill was seen as one of the most vulnerable Democratic incumbents prior to these remarks, but went on to win the 2012 election by nearly 16 points.

In the 2008 presidential primaries, the state voted for the major parties candidates who went on to secure their parties' nominations: John McCain (Republican) and Barack Obama (Democratic). Missouri did the same in 2016, voting for Hillary Clinton by a razor thin margin in the Democratic primary—actually tying with her opponent Bernie Sanders in one county—and voting narrowly for Donald Trump in the Republican primary. Despite her running mate having significant ties to the state, Clinton lost Missouri to Trump by more than 18 percentage points.

== Possible causes ==
Location and demographics are most often cited as the cause of Missouri's bellwether status. In 2004, the Chicago Tribune called Missouri the "bellwether state that almost exactly mirrors the demographic, economic and political makeup of the nation."

Slate columnist Chris Suellentrop wrote in 2004 that the state now "isn't so much a bellwether as it is a weathervane: It doesn't swing the country, the country swings it."

== In the 21st century ==
Missouri is no longer a perennial swing state, and slanted more firmly toward the American right-wing in the 21st century. Since 1964, the only three Democrats it has backed have been Southerners: Lyndon B. Johnson from Texas, Jimmy Carter from Georgia, and Bill Clinton from Arkansas. In 2008, Missouri narrowly voted for the losing candidate, Republican John McCain, despite a sizable electoral college win for Democrat Barack Obama. In 2012, Missouri favored losing candidate Mitt Romney by nearly 10 percentage points, despite another significant victory for Obama in the rest of the country. In 2016, 2020, and 2024, Missouri voted by 18.5%, 15.4%, and 18.4%, respectively for Republican Donald Trump; his margins in Missouri were far better than the national result. Missouri has not supported any Democratic candidate since Bill Clinton in the 1996 election. Starting in 2023, and continuing through 2026, Missouri has the most far-right combined US Senate delegation in the country.

One of the more important national phenomena that has not had the same impact in Missouri as in the rest of the country is the influx of immigrants, particularly Latinos. Analysts and journalists in recent times have pointed to states like Ohio, New Mexico, and Pennsylvania, as more accurate political and cultural bellwethers.

The 21st century Missouri electorate is also much less urbanized than in the 20th century. In 1900, the combined population of St. Louis (575,238) and Kansas City (163,752) was 24% of the population of Missouri (3,106,665), while by 1950 the combined population of St. Louis (856,796) and Kansas City (456,622) had grown to 33% of the population of the state (3,954,653). But shortly thereafter the population of St. Louis began a sharp decline, while that of Kansas City remained nearly static, such that the state is now dominated by rural, suburban, and small-city voters. Rural voters have also become more conservative. By 2000, the combined populations of St. Louis (348,189) and Kansas City (441,545) had declined to 14% of the population of Missouri (5,595,211).

Other states sometimes offered as 21st century equivalents of Missouri include:

- Ohio has voted for the winner of every presidential election since 1896, except in 1944, 1960 and 2020, with no Republican ever winning the White House without the state.
- Nevada has been carried by the winner of every presidential election since 1912, with only two exceptions: 1976 and 2016.
- Florida has voted for the winner of every presidential election since 1928, except in 1960, 1992, and 2020.

== See also ==
- 2020 United States presidential election in Missouri
- 2012 United States presidential election in Missouri
- 2008 United States presidential election in Missouri
- 1956 United States presidential election in Missouri
- United States presidential elections in Missouri
- As Maine goes, so goes the nation
- Missouri demographics
