= 1904 United States presidential election in Missouri =

- November 8, 1904
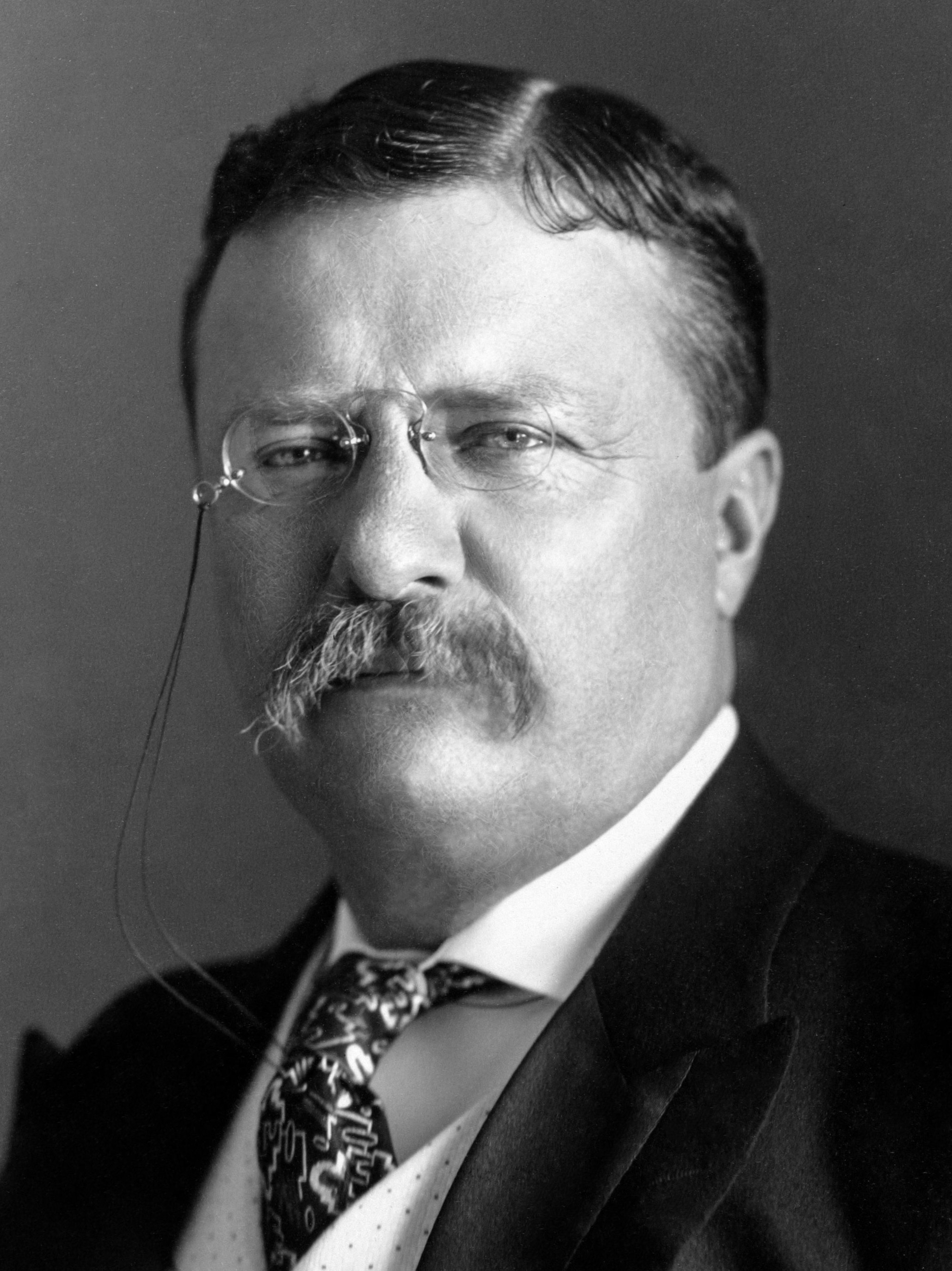

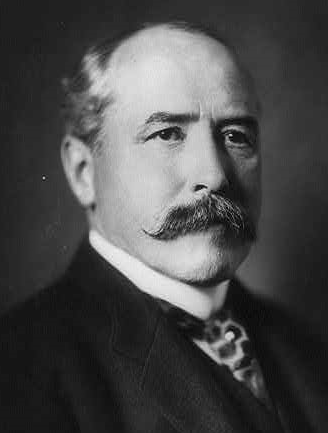
Nominee	Theodore Roosevelt	Alton B. Parker
Party	Republican	Democratic
Home state	New York	New York
Running mate	Charles W. Fairbanks	Henry G. Davis
Electoral vote	18	0
Popular vote	321,449	296,312
Percentage	49.93%	46.02%
County results
Roosevelt
40–50%
50–60%
60–70%
70–80%
80–90%
Parker
40–50%
50–60%
60–70%
70–80%
80–90%
President before election
Theodore Roosevelt
Republican
Elected President
Theodore Roosevelt
Republican

The 1904 United States presidential election in Missouri took place on November 8, 1904. Voters chose 18 representatives, or electors to the Electoral College, who voted for president and vice president.

Missouri voted for the Republican nominee, President Theodore Roosevelt, over the Democratic nominee, former Chief Judge of New York Court of Appeals Alton B. Parker. Roosevelt won the state by a narrow margin of 3.91%.

With his victory, Roosevelt became the third Republican presidential candidate to win Missouri, but the first one since Ulysses S. Grant in 1868. In voting for the GOP, Missouri repositioned itself from being associated with the Solid South to being seen as a bellwether swing state throughout the twentieth century. From this election until 2008, Missouri only backed a losing presidential candidate once, in 1956.

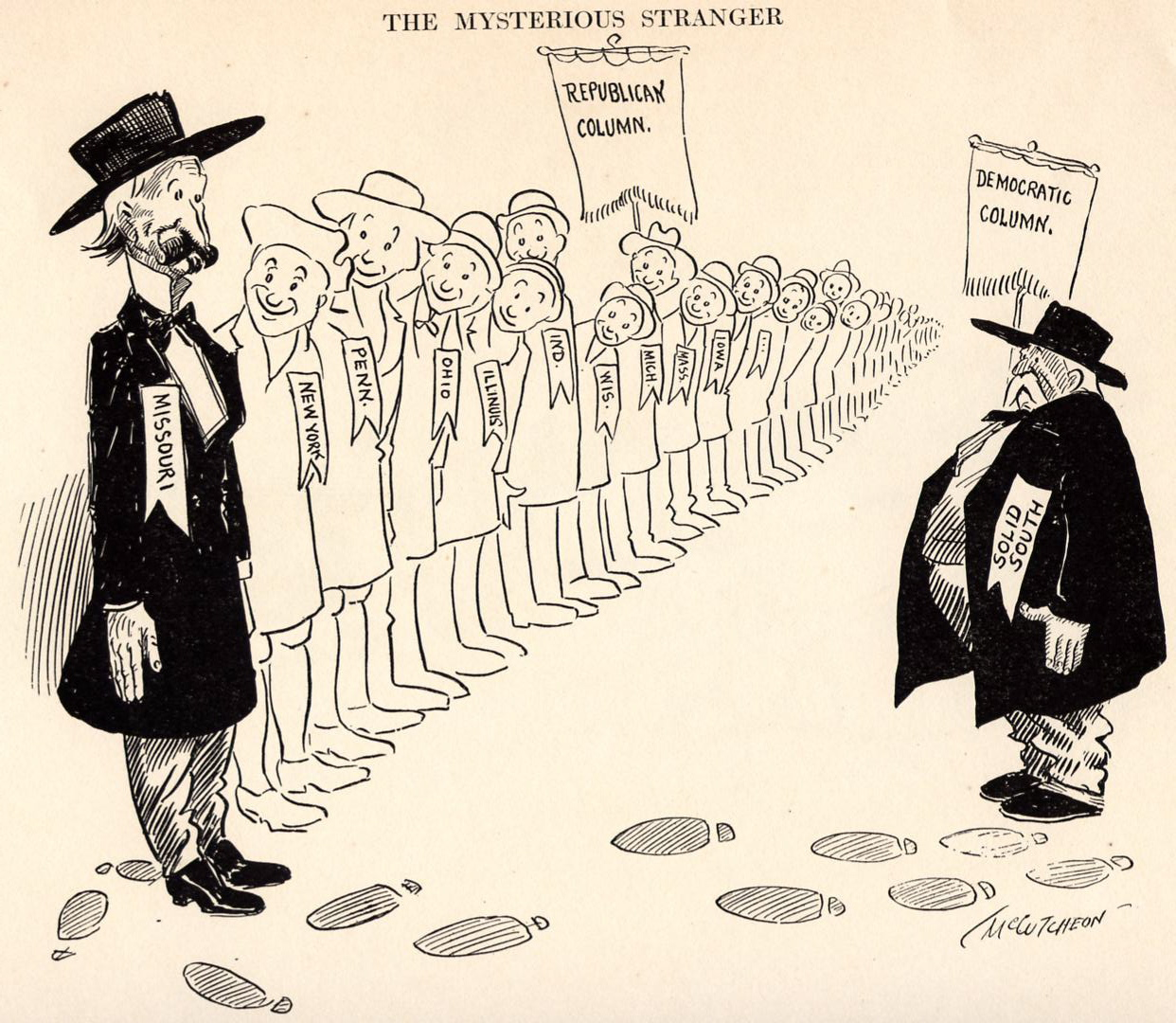
"The Mysterious Stranger" – A political cartoon showing Missouri having left the Democratic Solid South by voting Republican.

== Results ==
1904 United States presidential election in Missouri
Party	Candidate	Running mate	Popular vote		Electoral vote	
Party	Candidate	Running mate	Count	%	Count	%
Republican	Theodore Roosevelt of New York (incumbent)	Charles Warren Fairbanks of Indiana	321,449	49.93%	18	100.00%
Democratic	Alton Brooks Parker of New York	Henry Gassaway Davis of West Virginia	296,312	46.02%	0	0.00%
Socialist	Eugene Victor Debs of Indiana	Benjamin Hanford of New York	13,009	2.02%	0	0.00%
Prohibition	Silas Comfort Swallow of Pennsylvania	George Washington Carroll of Texas	7,191	1.12%	0	0.00%
Populist	Thomas E. Watson of Georgia	Thomas Tibbles of Nebraska	4,226	0.66%	0	0.00%
Socialist Labor	Charles Hunter Corregan of New York	William Wesley Cox of Illinois	1,674	0.26%	0	0.00%
Total			643,861	100.00%	18	100.00%

=== Results by county ===
1904 United States presidential election in Missouri by county
County	Theodore Roosevelt Republican		Alton Brooks Parker Democratic		Eugene Victor Debs Socialist		Various candidates Other parties		Margin		Total votes cast
County	#	%	#	%	#	%	#	%	#	%	Total votes cast
Adair	2,791	57.76%	1,687	34.91%	183	3.79%	171	3.54%	1,104	22.85%	4,832
Andrew	2,306	56.45%	1,691	41.40%	11	0.27%	77	1.88%	615	15.06%	4,085
Atchison	1,839	52.75%	1,506	43.20%	23	0.66%	118	3.38%	333	9.55%	3,486
Audrain	1,454	31.81%	3,006	65.76%	18	0.39%	93	2.03%	-1,552	-33.95%	4,571
Barry	2,568	51.21%	2,237	44.61%	98	1.95%	112	2.23%	331	6.60%	5,015
Barton	1,843	46.13%	1,811	45.33%	212	5.31%	129	3.23%	32	0.80%	3,995
Bates	2,956	47.11%	2,967	47.28%	91	1.45%	261	4.16%	-11	-0.18%	6,275
Benton	1,963	57.00%	1,372	39.84%	13	0.38%	96	2.79%	591	17.16%	3,444
Bollinger	1,587	53.26%	1,355	45.47%	0	0.00%	38	1.28%	232	7.79%	2,980
Boone	1,857	29.35%	4,375	69.15%	8	0.13%	87	1.38%	-2,518	-39.80%	6,327
Buchanan	8,703	51.62%	7,736	45.89%	208	1.23%	212	1.26%	967	5.74%	16,859
Butler	1,960	54.93%	1,369	38.37%	191	5.35%	48	1.35%	591	16.56%	3,568
Caldwell	2,276	60.92%	1,350	36.13%	2	0.05%	108	2.89%	926	24.79%	3,736
Callaway	1,765	32.29%	3,596	65.79%	3	0.05%	102	1.87%	-1,831	-33.50%	5,466
Camden	1,466	60.23%	883	36.28%	5	0.21%	80	3.29%	583	23.95%	2,434
Cape Girardeau	3,090	56.31%	2,187	39.86%	26	0.47%	184	3.35%	903	16.46%	5,487
Carroll	3,032	51.67%	2,673	45.55%	26	0.44%	137	2.33%	359	6.12%	5,868
Carter	510	46.11%	556	50.27%	20	1.81%	20	1.81%	-46	-4.16%	1,106
Cass	2,375	44.36%	2,750	51.36%	99	1.85%	130	2.43%	-375	-7.00%	5,354
Cedar	1,885	52.90%	1,533	43.03%	30	0.84%	115	3.23%	352	9.88%	3,563
Chariton	2,064	39.39%	3,058	58.36%	12	0.23%	106	2.02%	-994	-18.97%	5,240
Christian	1,947	66.13%	871	29.59%	68	2.31%	58	1.97%	1,076	36.55%	2,944
Clark	1,836	50.50%	1,724	47.41%	1	0.03%	75	2.06%	112	3.08%	3,636
Clay	1,077	26.70%	2,832	70.22%	25	0.62%	99	2.45%	-1,755	-43.52%	4,033
Clinton	1,759	47.20%	1,886	50.60%	4	0.11%	78	2.09%	-127	-3.41%	3,727
Cole	2,081	47.48%	2,244	51.20%	18	0.41%	40	0.91%	-163	-3.72%	4,383
Cooper	2,767	51.98%	2,485	46.68%	8	0.15%	63	1.18%	282	5.30%	5,323
Crawford	1,535	53.97%	1,175	41.32%	108	3.80%	26	0.91%	360	12.66%	2,844
Dade	1,994	56.09%	1,376	38.71%	46	1.29%	139	3.91%	618	17.38%	3,555
Dallas	1,711	64.81%	797	30.19%	13	0.49%	119	4.51%	914	34.62%	2,640
Daviess	2,568	50.31%	2,344	45.92%	2	0.04%	190	3.72%	224	4.39%	5,104
DeKalb	1,768	51.23%	1,607	46.57%	0	0.00%	76	2.20%	161	4.67%	3,451
Dent	1,154	48.59%	1,186	49.94%	5	0.21%	30	1.26%	-32	-1.35%	2,375
Douglas	1,830	71.91%	437	17.17%	156	6.13%	122	4.79%	1,393	54.73%	2,545
Dunklin	1,461	38.47%	2,229	58.69%	16	0.42%	92	2.42%	-768	-20.22%	3,798
Franklin	3,738	60.90%	2,278	37.11%	68	1.11%	54	0.88%	1,460	23.79%	6,138
Gasconade	2,045	80.20%	469	18.39%	4	0.16%	32	1.25%	1,576	61.80%	2,550
Gentry	2,060	46.91%	2,157	49.12%	47	1.07%	127	2.89%	-97	-2.21%	4,391
Greene	6,570	54.98%	4,540	37.99%	452	3.78%	387	3.24%	2,030	16.99%	11,949
Grundy	2,596	67.15%	1,195	30.91%	0	0.00%	75	1.94%	1,401	36.24%	3,866
Harrison	3,014	62.96%	1,596	33.34%	8	0.17%	169	3.53%	1,418	29.62%	4,787
Henry	2,799	44.49%	3,222	51.22%	36	0.57%	234	3.72%	-423	-6.72%	6,291
Hickory	1,245	66.65%	531	28.43%	9	0.48%	83	4.44%	714	38.22%	1,868
Holt	2,208	61.47%	1,277	35.55%	2	0.06%	105	2.92%	931	25.92%	3,592
Howard	1,199	30.52%	2,674	68.06%	19	0.48%	37	0.94%	-1,475	-37.54%	3,929
Howell	2,089	53.39%	1,605	41.02%	130	3.32%	89	2.27%	484	12.37%	3,913
Iron	670	42.92%	861	55.16%	8	0.51%	22	1.41%	-191	-12.24%	1,561
Jackson	25,794	53.16%	20,582	42.42%	1,356	2.79%	789	1.63%	5,212	10.74%	48,521
Jasper	7,851	50.53%	6,006	38.66%	1,185	7.63%	495	3.19%	1,845	11.87%	15,537
Jefferson	2,909	52.09%	2,560	45.84%	45	0.81%	71	1.27%	349	6.25%	5,585
Johnson	2,989	46.56%	3,277	51.05%	50	0.78%	103	1.60%	-288	-4.49%	6,419
Knox	1,321	45.15%	1,527	52.19%	18	0.62%	60	2.05%	-206	-7.04%	2,926
Laclede	1,874	53.94%	1,450	41.74%	49	1.41%	101	2.91%	424	12.20%	3,474
Lafayette	3,531	48.82%	3,583	49.54%	26	0.36%	93	1.29%	-52	-0.72%	7,233
Lawrence	3,077	52.55%	2,372	40.51%	275	4.70%	131	2.24%	705	12.04%	5,855
Lewis	1,467	39.08%	2,202	58.66%	22	0.59%	63	1.68%	-735	-19.58%	3,754
Lincoln	1,462	38.12%	2,295	59.84%	12	0.31%	66	1.72%	-833	-21.72%	3,835
Linn	3,182	52.58%	2,748	45.41%	26	0.43%	96	1.59%	434	7.17%	6,052
Livingston	2,480	48.10%	2,356	45.69%	54	1.05%	266	5.16%	124	2.40%	5,156
Macon	3,674	48.55%	3,604	47.63%	95	1.26%	194	2.56%	70	0.93%	7,567
Madison	1,106	49.33%	1,076	47.99%	17	0.76%	43	1.92%	30	1.34%	2,242
Maries	599	33.08%	1,184	65.38%	1	0.06%	27	1.49%	-585	-32.30%	1,811
Marion	2,433	42.22%	3,127	54.27%	67	1.16%	135	2.34%	-694	-12.04%	5,762
McDonald	1,266	47.15%	1,269	47.26%	77	2.87%	73	2.72%	-3	-0.11%	2,685
Mercer	1,896	68.18%	819	29.45%	8	0.29%	58	2.09%	1,077	38.73%	2,781
Miller	1,959	57.75%	1,351	39.83%	8	0.24%	74	2.18%	608	17.92%	3,392
Mississippi	1,161	47.41%	1,229	50.18%	6	0.24%	53	2.16%	-68	-2.78%	2,449
Moniteau	1,756	47.78%	1,763	47.97%	23	0.63%	133	3.62%	-7	-0.19%	3,675
Monroe	790	18.17%	3,487	80.18%	3	0.07%	69	1.59%	-2,697	-62.01%	4,349
Montgomery	1,979	48.40%	1,986	48.57%	9	0.22%	115	2.81%	-7	-0.17%	4,089
Morgan	1,624	55.60%	1,262	43.20%	6	0.21%	29	0.99%	362	12.39%	2,921
New Madrid	922	41.99%	1,257	57.24%	3	0.14%	14	0.64%	-335	-15.26%	2,196
Newton	2,647	48.60%	2,296	42.15%	200	3.67%	304	5.58%	351	6.44%	5,447
Nodaway	3,875	52.34%	3,356	45.33%	43	0.58%	130	1.76%	519	7.01%	7,404
Oregon	693	33.72%	1,215	59.12%	120	5.84%	27	1.31%	-522	-25.40%	2,055
Osage	1,699	52.70%	1,451	45.01%	5	0.16%	69	2.14%	248	7.69%	3,224
Ozark	1,305	68.00%	556	28.97%	11	0.57%	47	2.45%	749	39.03%	1,919
Pemiscot	923	39.39%	1,375	58.69%	6	0.26%	39	1.66%	-452	-19.29%	2,343
Perry	1,733	52.45%	1,522	46.07%	0	0.00%	49	1.48%	211	6.39%	3,304
Pettis	3,820	51.38%	3,346	45.00%	155	2.08%	114	1.53%	474	6.38%	7,435
Phelps	1,371	47.46%	1,384	47.91%	11	0.38%	123	4.26%	-13	-0.45%	2,889
Pike	2,445	43.60%	3,113	55.51%	12	0.21%	38	0.68%	-668	-11.91%	5,608
Platte	953	27.06%	2,537	72.03%	3	0.09%	29	0.82%	-1,584	-44.97%	3,522
Polk	2,659	56.88%	1,807	38.65%	13	0.28%	196	4.19%	852	18.22%	4,675
Pulaski	837	40.95%	1,190	58.22%	2	0.10%	15	0.73%	-353	-17.27%	2,044
Putnam	2,226	68.45%	822	25.28%	57	1.75%	147	4.52%	1,404	43.17%	3,252
Ralls	792	30.32%	1,794	68.68%	7	0.27%	19	0.73%	-1,002	-38.36%	2,612
Randolph	2,139	37.59%	3,351	58.88%	52	0.91%	149	2.62%	-1,212	-21.30%	5,691
Ray	1,792	38.86%	2,744	59.51%	19	0.41%	56	1.21%	-952	-20.65%	4,611
Reynolds	505	36.23%	877	62.91%	1	0.07%	11	0.79%	-372	-26.69%	1,394
Ripley	781	39.15%	1,089	54.59%	11	0.55%	114	5.71%	-308	-15.44%	1,995
Saint Charles	3,203	62.91%	1,788	35.12%	53	1.04%	47	0.92%	1,415	27.79%	5,091
Saint Clair	1,895	49.65%	1,761	46.14%	56	1.47%	105	2.75%	134	3.51%	3,817
Saint Francois	2,894	51.25%	2,615	46.31%	55	0.97%	83	1.47%	279	4.94%	5,647
Saint Louis County	7,375	69.45%	2,870	27.03%	250	2.35%	124	1.17%	4,505	42.42%	10,619
Saint Louis City	57,547	49.70%	51,858	44.79%	5,120	4.42%	1,267	1.09%	5,689	4.91%	115,792
Sainte Genevieve	986	45.50%	1,163	53.67%	4	0.18%	14	0.65%	-177	-8.17%	2,167
Saline	2,805	42.08%	3,710	55.66%	26	0.39%	125	1.88%	-905	-13.58%	6,666
Schuyler	1,054	45.63%	1,139	49.31%	13	0.56%	104	4.50%	-85	-3.68%	2,310
Scotland	1,354	45.54%	1,530	51.46%	37	1.24%	52	1.75%	-176	-5.92%	2,973
Scott	1,124	41.96%	1,470	54.87%	33	1.23%	52	1.94%	-346	-12.92%	2,679
Shannon	697	39.67%	1,006	57.26%	10	0.57%	44	2.50%	-309	-17.59%	1,757
Shelby	1,257	36.30%	2,124	61.33%	6	0.17%	76	2.19%	-867	-25.04%	3,463
Stoddard	2,088	45.63%	2,265	49.50%	143	3.13%	80	1.75%	-177	-3.87%	4,576
Stone	1,219	73.52%	337	20.33%	53	3.20%	49	2.96%	882	53.20%	1,658
Sullivan	2,474	51.43%	2,224	46.24%	28	0.58%	84	1.75%	250	5.20%	4,810
Taney	1,162	64.34%	568	31.45%	47	2.60%	29	1.61%	594	32.89%	1,806
Texas	1,801	44.77%	2,118	52.65%	45	1.12%	59	1.47%	-317	-7.88%	4,023
Vernon	2,450	40.51%	3,225	53.32%	193	3.19%	180	2.98%	-775	-12.81%	6,048
Warren	1,537	75.31%	435	21.31%	42	2.06%	27	1.32%	1,102	53.99%	2,041
Washington	1,673	54.64%	1,339	43.73%	5	0.16%	45	1.47%	334	10.91%	3,062
Wayne	1,678	50.38%	1,567	47.04%	28	0.84%	58	1.74%	111	3.33%	3,331
Webster	1,854	52.91%	1,474	42.07%	12	0.34%	164	4.68%	380	10.84%	3,504
Worth	1,042	49.78%	967	46.20%	1	0.05%	83	3.97%	75	3.58%	2,093
Wright	1,972	58.97%	1,266	37.86%	48	1.44%	58	1.73%	706	21.11%	3,344
Totals	321,449	49.93%	296,312	46.02%	13,009	2.02%	13,081	2.03%	25,137	3.90%	643,851

== See also ==
- United States presidential elections in Missouri
