= Elections in Missouri =

Elections in Missouri are held to fill various local, state and federal seats. Special elections may be held to fill vacancies at other points in time.

In a 2020 study, Missouri was ranked as the 3rd hardest state for citizens to vote in, based on registration and identification requirements, and convenience provisions.

== Voting rights and voting powers ==
=== Districting ===
Congressional and legislative districting is performed by legislative committee following the release of the decennial United States census.

=== Political parties ===
Missouri performed non-partisan voter registration prior to 2023.

=== Voter registration ===
Residents have been allowed to register online to vote or update their registration online since 2014, but only using mobile or touchscreen computers. 17.5-year-old residents may preregister to vote. Starting in 2023, an optional question on voters' party affiliation was added to voter registration forms statewide.

=== Absentee voting and early voting ===
Absentee ballots may only be requested with a provided excuse and by mail or fax (with a copy of acceptable photo ID) by the second Wednesday prior to an election. In-person absentee voting is allowed from the second Tuesday prior to an election, with acceptable photo ID required at early voting locations.

=== Ballot measures ===
The General Assembly may refer any measure, including constitutional amendments, to a ballot measure with simple majorities of both houses in a single session. Residents may initiate ballot measures, including referendums and constitutional amendments. Constitutional amendments may be initiated by a minimum number of valid signatures from the equivalent of 8% of votes cast in the last gubernatorial election from each of two-thirds of the state's congressional districts.

== Gubernatorial ==
- 1820 Missouri gubernatorial election
- 1824 Missouri gubernatorial election
- 1825 Missouri gubernatorial special election
- 1828 Missouri gubernatorial election
- 1832 Missouri gubernatorial election
- 1836 Missouri gubernatorial election
- 1840 Missouri gubernatorial election
- 1844 Missouri gubernatorial election
- 1848 Missouri gubernatorial election
- 1852 Missouri gubernatorial election
- 1856 Missouri gubernatorial election
- 1857 Missouri gubernatorial special election
- 1860 Missouri gubernatorial election
- 1864 Missouri gubernatorial election
- 1868 Missouri gubernatorial election
- 1870 Missouri gubernatorial election
- 1872 Missouri gubernatorial election
- 1874 Missouri gubernatorial election
- 1876 Missouri gubernatorial election
- 1880 Missouri gubernatorial election
- 1884 Missouri gubernatorial election
- 1888 Missouri gubernatorial election
- 1892 Missouri gubernatorial election
- 1896 Missouri gubernatorial election
- 1900 Missouri gubernatorial election
- 1904 Missouri gubernatorial election
- 1908 Missouri gubernatorial election
- 1912 Missouri gubernatorial election
- 1916 Missouri gubernatorial election
- 1920 Missouri gubernatorial election
- 1924 Missouri gubernatorial election
- 1928 Missouri gubernatorial election
- 1932 Missouri gubernatorial election
- 1936 Missouri gubernatorial election
- 1940 Missouri gubernatorial election
- 1944 Missouri gubernatorial election
- 1948 Missouri gubernatorial election
- 1952 Missouri gubernatorial election
- 1956 Missouri gubernatorial election
- 1960 Missouri gubernatorial election
- 1964 Missouri gubernatorial election
- 1968 Missouri gubernatorial election
- 1972 Missouri gubernatorial election
- 1976 Missouri gubernatorial election
- 1980 Missouri gubernatorial election
- 1984 Missouri gubernatorial election
- 1988 Missouri gubernatorial election
- 1992 Missouri gubernatorial election
- 1996 Missouri gubernatorial election
- 2000 Missouri gubernatorial election
- 2004 Missouri gubernatorial election
- 2008 Missouri gubernatorial election
- 2012 Missouri gubernatorial election
- 2016 Missouri gubernatorial election
- 2020 Missouri gubernatorial election
- 2024 Missouri gubernatorial election

== Presidential ==
- 1820 United States presidential election in Missouri
- 1824 United States presidential election in Missouri
- 1828 United States presidential election in Missouri
- 1832 United States presidential election in Missouri
- 1836 United States presidential election in Missouri
- 1840 United States presidential election in Missouri
- 1844 United States presidential election in Missouri
- 1848 United States presidential election in Missouri
- 1852 United States presidential election in Missouri
- 1856 United States presidential election in Missouri
- 1860 United States presidential election in Missouri
- 1864 United States presidential election in Missouri
- 1868 United States presidential election in Missouri
- 1872 United States presidential election in Missouri
- 1876 United States presidential election in Missouri
- 1880 United States presidential election in Missouri
- 1884 United States presidential election in Missouri
- 1888 United States presidential election in Missouri
- 1892 United States presidential election in Missouri
- 1896 United States presidential election in Missouri
- 1900 United States presidential election in Missouri
- 1904 United States presidential election in Missouri
- 1908 United States presidential election in Missouri
- 1912 United States presidential election in Missouri
- 1916 United States presidential election in Missouri
- 1920 United States presidential election in Missouri
- 1924 United States presidential election in Missouri
- 1928 United States presidential election in Missouri
- 1932 United States presidential election in Missouri
- 1936 United States presidential election in Missouri
- 1940 United States presidential election in Missouri
- 1944 United States presidential election in Missouri
- 1948 United States presidential election in Missouri
- 1952 United States presidential election in Missouri
- 1956 United States presidential election in Missouri
- 1960 United States presidential election in Missouri
- 1964 United States presidential election in Missouri
- 1968 United States presidential election in Missouri
- 1972 United States presidential election in Missouri
- 1976 United States presidential election in Missouri
- 1980 United States presidential election in Missouri
- 1984 United States presidential election in Missouri
- 1988 United States presidential election in Missouri
- 1992 United States presidential election in Missouri
- 1996 United States presidential election in Missouri
- 2000 United States presidential election in Missouri
- 2004 United States presidential election in Missouri
- 2008 United States presidential election in Missouri
- 2012 United States presidential election in Missouri
- 2016 United States presidential election in Missouri
- 2020 United States presidential election in Missouri
- 2024 United States presidential election in Missouri

== See also ==
- Political party strength in Missouri
- Women's suffrage in Missouri
