= List of governors of Missouri =

Governor of Missouri
- State seal

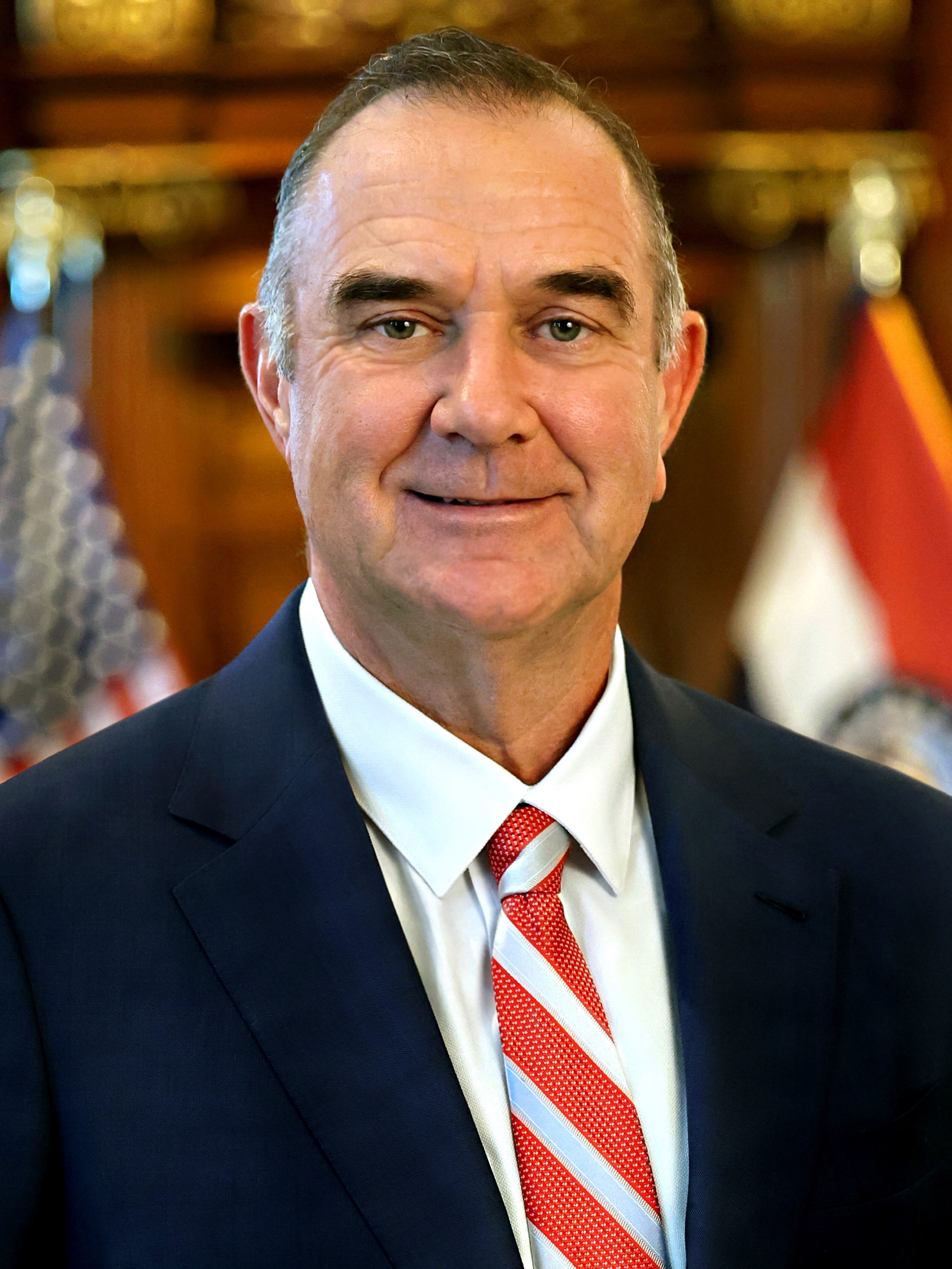
- Incumbent; Mike Kehoe since January 13, 2025
- Style: The Honorable
- Residence: Missouri Governor's Mansion
- Term length: Four years, renewable once
- Precursor: Governor of Missouri Territory
- Inaugural holder: Alexander McNair
- Formation: September 18, 1820 (206 years ago)
- Succession: Line of succession
- Deputy: Lieutenant Governor of Missouri
- Salary: $137,167 (2022)
- Website: governor.mo.gov

The governor of Missouri is the head of government of the U.S. state of Missouri and the commander-in-chief of the Missouri National Guard. The governor has a duty to enforce state laws and the power to either approve or veto bills passed by the Missouri Legislature, to convene the legislature and grant pardons, except in cases of impeachment.

The current governor is Republican Mike Kehoe, who took office on January 13, 2025.

== List of governors ==
Louisiana was purchased from France in 1803, with it being proclaimed in St. Louis in Upper Louisiana on March 10, 1804, by Amos Stoddard, who remained as military commander of the region until October 1, 1804, when Orleans Territory was split from it. The remainder was designated the District of Louisiana and placed under the jurisdiction of Indiana Territory and its governor, William Henry Harrison.

=== Louisiana Territory and Missouri Territory ===
The District of Louisiana was organized as Louisiana Territory on July 4, 1805; it was renamed Missouri Territory on June 4, 1812, after the admission of the state of Louisiana. It had four governors appointed by the president of the United States, including both Meriwether Lewis and William Clark of the Lewis and Clark Expedition.

Governors of Louisiana and Missouri Territory
No.	Governor	Term in office (Note: The range given is from the date the governor was confirmed by the Senate, or appointed by the President during a Senate recess, to the date the governor's successor was confirmed, unless noted.)	Appointed by
1	James Wilkinson (1757–1825)	July 4, 1805 (Note: Wilkinson was appointed on March 11, 1805, during a Senate recess, for a term to begin July 4. He was formally nominated on December 20, 1805; confirmed by the Senate on January 27, 1806; and confirmation was communicated to the president on January 30.) – March 3, 1807 (608 days; replaced) (Note: Wilkinson left the territory August 16, 1806, after which point Secretary of the Territory Joseph Brown acted as governor.)	Thomas Jefferson
2	Meriwether Lewis (1774–1809)	March 3, 1807 (Note: Lewis was nominated on February 28, 1807; confirmed by the Senate on March 2; and confirmation and communicated to the president on March 3. He arrived in the territory on March 8, 1808.) – October 11, 1809 (954 days; died in office) (Note: Lewis died in Tennessee while en route to Washington to answer complaints about his actions as governor; it is unknown if he was murdered or died by suicide. Secretary of the Territory Frederick Bates acted as governor until his successor arrived.)	Thomas Jefferson
3	Benjamin Howard (1760–1814)	April 18, 1810 (Note: Howard was nominated on April 17, 1810, confirmed by the Senate on April 18, and arrived in the territory on September 17.) – October 31, 1812 (928 days; resigned) (Note: Howard resigned to accept a commission as brigadier general in the United States Army.)	James Madison
4	William Clark (1770–1838)	July 1, 1813 (Note: Clark was nominated on May 31, 1813; though his nomination notes that he had been appointed during a Senate recess, no specifics on that appointment have been found. He was confirmed by the Senate on June 2, and the confirmation was communicated to the president on June 16. He was reconfirmed by the Senate on January 21, 1817, and on January 24, 1820.) – September 18, 1820 (2637 days; lost election)	James Madison
4	William Clark (1770–1838)	July 1, 1813 – September 18, 1820 (2637 days; lost election)	James Monroe

=== State of Missouri ===
Missouri was admitted to the union on August 10, 1821.

The original constitution of 1820 created the offices of governor and lieutenant governor, to serve terms of four years without being able to succeed themselves. Terms were shortened to 2 years in 1865, with a limit of serving no more than four out of every six years. They were returned in 1875 to the four-year term and limit on succession of the 1820 constitution, and the term limit changed to two terms in 1965. Originally, the lieutenant governor would act as governor in the event of a vacancy; a 1968 amendment made it so that the lieutenant governor becomes governor in that situation.

A group including the governor, lieutenant governor, and members of the Missouri General Assembly, proclaimed Missouri's secession from the Union on October 31, 1861, and it was admitted to the Confederate States of America on November 28, 1861. The Confederate government elected two governors, but only had any control in the south of the state, and was forced into exile in Marshall, Texas, after the Battle of Pea Ridge in March 1862.

Governors of the State of Missouri
No.	Governor	Term in office	Party	Election	Lt. Governor (Note: Lieutenant governors represented the same party as their governor unless noted.)
1	Alexander McNair (1775–1826)	September 18, 1820 – November 17, 1824 (1522 days; term-limited) (Note: Under the 1820 constitution, governors were ineligible for four years after the end of their term.)	Democratic- Republican	1820	William H. Ashley
2	Frederick Bates (1777–1825)	November 17, 1824 (Note: Modern sources tend to say Bates took office on November 15; however, while this was the date McNair delivered his farewell address, Bates was not sworn in until November 17.) – August 4, 1825 (261 days; died in office)	Democratic- Republican	1824	Benjamin Harrison Reeves (resigned July 1825)
2	Frederick Bates (1777–1825)	November 17, 1824 – August 4, 1825 (261 days; died in office)	Democratic- Republican	1824	Vacant
3	Abraham J. Williams (1781–1839)	August 4, 1825 – January 20, 1826 (170 days; retired)	Democratic- Republican	President of the Senate acting	Vacant
4	John Miller (1781–1846)	January 20, 1826 – November 21, 1832 (2498 days; term-limited)	Democratic	1825 (special) (Note: Special election to fill the remainder of Frederick Bates' term.)	Vacant
4	John Miller (1781–1846)	January 20, 1826 – November 21, 1832 (2498 days; term-limited)	Democratic	1828	Daniel Dunklin
5	Daniel Dunklin (1790–1844)	November 21, 1832 – September 30, 1836 (1410 days; resigned) (Note: Dunklin resigned to be Surveyor general for Missouri and Illinois.)	Democratic (Note: Most sources label Dunklin a Democrat, but Glashan labels him a Democratic-Republican.)	1832	Lilburn Boggs
6	Lilburn Boggs (1796–1860)	September 30, 1836 – November 18, 1840 (1511 days; term-limited)	Democratic	Lieutenant governor acting	Acting as governor
6	Lilburn Boggs (1796–1860)	September 30, 1836 – November 18, 1840 (1511 days; term-limited)	Democratic	1836	Franklin Cannon
7	Thomas Reynolds (1796–1844)	November 18, 1840 – February 9, 1844 (1179 days; died in office)	Democratic	1840	Meredith Marmaduke
8	Meredith Marmaduke (1791–1864)	February 9, 1844 – November 20, 1844 (286 days; retired)	Democratic	Lieutenant governor acting	Acting as governor
9	John C. Edwards (1804–1888)	November 20, 1844 – December 27, 1848 (1499 days; term-limited)	Democratic	1844	James Young
10	Austin A. King (1802–1870)	December 27, 1848 – January 3, 1853 (1469 days; term-limited)	Democratic	1848	Thomas L. Price
11	Sterling Price (1809–1867)	January 3, 1853 – January 5, 1857 (1464 days; term-limited)	Democratic	1852	Wilson Brown (died August 27, 1855)
11	Sterling Price (1809–1867)	January 3, 1853 – January 5, 1857 (1464 days; term-limited)	Democratic	1852	Vacant
12	Trusten Polk (1811–1876)	January 5, 1857 – February 27, 1857 (54 days; resigned) (Note: Polk resigned, having been elected to the United States Senate.)	Democratic	1856	Hancock Lee Jackson
13	Hancock Lee Jackson (1796–1876)	February 27, 1857 – October 22, 1857 (238 days; retired)	Democratic	Lieutenant governor acting	Acting as governor
14	Robert Marcellus Stewart (1815–1871)	October 22, 1857 – January 3, 1861 (1170 days; term-limited)	Democratic	1857 (special) (Note: Special election to fill the remainder of Trusten Polk's term.)	Hancock Lee Jackson
15	Claiborne Fox Jackson (1806–1862)	January 3, 1861 – July 31, 1861 (210 days; office declared vacant) (Note: Jackson was pro-Confederate, and fled Jefferson City on June 17, 1861, after the Battle of Boonville in which Union forces gained control of the capital. The pro-Union constitutional convention declared his office vacant, and elected a new provisional governor, on July 31. Jackson would soon establish a Confederate-aligned government in Neosho, Missouri.)	Democratic	1860	Thomas Caute Reynolds
16	Hamilton Rowan Gamble (1798–1864)	July 31, 1861 – January 31, 1864 (915 days; died in office)	Union	Provisional governor elected by convention	Willard P. Hall
17	Willard P. Hall (1820–1882)	January 31, 1864 – January 2, 1865 (338 days; retired)	Union	Lieutenant governor acting	Acting as governor
18	Thomas Clement Fletcher (1827–1899)	January 2, 1865 – January 12, 1869 (1472 days; term-limited) (Note: Under the 1865 constitution, governors were ineligible to serve more than four years in six.)	Republican	1864	George Smith
19	Joseph W. McClurg (1818–1900)	January 12, 1869 – January 9, 1871 (728 days; lost election)	Republican	1868	Edwin O. Stanard
20	Benjamin Gratz Brown (1826–1885)	January 9, 1871 – January 8, 1873 (731 days; retired) (Note: Brown instead ran unsuccessfully for Vice President of the United States.)	Liberal; Republican	1870	Joseph J. Gravely (died April 28, 1872)
20	Benjamin Gratz Brown (1826–1885)	January 9, 1871 – January 8, 1873 (731 days; retired)	Liberal; Republican	1870	Vacant
21	Silas Woodson (1819–1896)	January 8, 1873 – January 12, 1875 (735 days; retired)	Democratic (Note: Woodson also represented the Liberal Republican Party.)	1872	Charles Phillip Johnson
22	Charles Henry Hardin (1820–1892)	January 12, 1875 – January 8, 1877 (728 days; retired)	Democratic (Note: Hardin also represented the Liberal Republican Party.)	1874	Norman Jay Colman
23	John S. Phelps (1814–1886)	January 8, 1877 – January 10, 1881 (1464 days; term-limited) (Note: Under the 1875 constitution, governors were ineligible to be reelected as their own successor.)	Democratic	1876	Henry Clay Brockmeyer
24	Thomas Theodore Crittenden (1832–1909)	January 10, 1881 – January 12, 1885 (1464 days; term-limited)	Democratic	1880	Robert Alexander Campbell
25	John S. Marmaduke (1833–1887)	January 12, 1885 – December 28, 1887 (1081 days; died in office)	Democratic	1884	Albert P. Morehouse
26	Albert P. Morehouse (1835–1891)	December 28, 1887 – January 14, 1889 (384 days; lost nomination)	Democratic	Lieutenant governor acting	Acting as governor
27	David R. Francis (1850–1927)	January 14, 1889 – January 9, 1893 (1457 days; term-limited)	Democratic	1888	Stephen Hugh Claycomb
28	William J. Stone (1848–1918)	January 9, 1893 – January 11, 1897 (1464 days; term-limited)	Democratic	1892	John Baptiste O'Meara
29	Lawrence Vest Stephens (1858–1923)	January 11, 1897 – January 14, 1901 (1464 days; term-limited)	Democratic	1896	August Bolte
30	Alexander M. Dockery (1845–1926)	January 14, 1901 – January 9, 1905 (1457 days; term-limited)	Democratic	1900	John Adams Lee (resigned April 25, 1903)
30	Alexander M. Dockery (1845–1926)	January 14, 1901 – January 9, 1905 (1457 days; term-limited)	Democratic	1900	Thomas L. Rubey (appointed April 25, 1903)
31	Joseph W. Folk (1869–1923)	January 9, 1905 – January 11, 1909 (1464 days; term-limited) (Note: Folk, being term-limited, had already lost the Democratic nomination to the United States Senate when his term ended.)	Democratic	1904	John C. McKinley
32	Herbert S. Hadley (1872–1927)	January 11, 1909 – January 13, 1913 (1464 days; term-limited)	Republican	1908	Jacob F. Gmelich
33	Elliott Woolfolk Major (1864–1949)	January 13, 1913 – January 8, 1917 (1457 days; term-limited)	Democratic	1912	William Rock Painter
34	Frederick D. Gardner (1869–1933)	January 8, 1917 – January 10, 1921 (1464 days; term-limited)	Democratic	1916	Wallace Crossley
35	Arthur M. Hyde (1877–1947)	January 10, 1921 – January 12, 1925 (1464 days; term-limited)	Republican	1920	Hiram Lloyd
36	Sam Aaron Baker (1874–1933)	January 12, 1925 – January 14, 1929 (1464 days; term-limited)	Republican	1924	Philip A. Bennett
37	Henry S. Caulfield (1873–1966)	January 14, 1929 – January 9, 1933 (1457 days; term-limited)	Republican	1928	Edward Henry Winter
38	Guy Brasfield Park (1872–1946)	January 9, 1933 – January 11, 1937 (1464 days; term-limited)	Democratic	1932	Frank Gaines Harris (died December 30, 1944)
39	Lloyd C. Stark (1886–1972)	January 11, 1937 – February 26, 1941 (1508 days; term-limited) (Note: Stark, being term-limited, had already lost the Democratic nomination for the United States Senate when his term ended.)	Democratic	1936	Frank Gaines Harris (died December 30, 1944)
40	Forrest C. Donnell (1884–1980)	February 26, 1941 (Note: The election was very close, and the House of Representatives refused to certify Donnell's election until February 26, 1941, after being ordered to do so by the Supreme Court of Missouri.) – January 8, 1945 (1413 days; term-limited) (Note: Donnell, being term-limited, had already been elected to the United States Senate when his term ended.)	Republican	1940	Frank Gaines Harris (died December 30, 1944)
40	Forrest C. Donnell (1884–1980)	February 26, 1941 – January 8, 1945 (1413 days; term-limited)	Republican	1940	Vacant
41	Phil M. Donnelly (1891–1961)	January 8, 1945 – January 10, 1949 (1464 days; term-limited) (Note: Under the 1945 constitution, governors were ineligible to be reelected as their own successor.)	Democratic	1944	Walter Naylor Davis
42	Forrest Smith (1886–1962)	January 10, 1949 – January 12, 1953 (1464 days; term-limited)	Democratic	1948	James T. Blair Jr.
43	Phil M. Donnelly (1891–1961)	January 12, 1953 – January 14, 1957 (1464 days; term-limited)	Democratic	1952	James T. Blair Jr.
44	James T. Blair Jr. (1902–1962)	January 14, 1957 – January 9, 1961 (1457 days; term-limited)	Democratic	1956	Edward V. Long (resigned September 23, 1960)
44	James T. Blair Jr. (1902–1962)	January 14, 1957 – January 9, 1961 (1457 days; term-limited)	Democratic	1956	Vacant
45	John M. Dalton (1900–1972)	January 9, 1961 – January 11, 1965 (1464 days; term-limited)	Democratic	1960	Hilary A. Bush
46	Warren E. Hearnes (1923–2009)	January 11, 1965 – January 8, 1973 (2920 days; term-limited) (Note: Under a 1965 amendment to the constitution, governors are ineligible to be elected more than twice.)	Democratic	1964	Thomas Eagleton (resigned December 27, 1968)
46	Warren E. Hearnes (1923–2009)	January 11, 1965 – January 8, 1973 (2920 days; term-limited)	Democratic	1964	Vacant
46	Warren E. Hearnes (1923–2009)	January 11, 1965 – January 8, 1973 (2920 days; term-limited)	Democratic	1968	William S. Morris
47	Kit Bond (1939–2025)	January 8, 1973 – January 10, 1977 (1464 days; lost election)	Republican	1972	Bill Phelps
48	Joseph P. Teasdale (1936–2014)	January 10, 1977 – January 12, 1981 (1464 days; lost election)	Democratic	1976	Bill Phelps
49	Kit Bond (1939–2025)	January 12, 1981 – January 14, 1985 (1464 days; retired)	Republican	1980	Ken Rothman
50	John Ashcroft (b. 1942)	January 14, 1985 – January 11, 1993 (2920 days; term-limited)	Republican	1984	Harriett Woods
50	John Ashcroft (b. 1942)	January 14, 1985 – January 11, 1993 (2920 days; term-limited)	Republican	1988	Mel Carnahan
51	Mel Carnahan (1934–2000)	January 11, 1993 – October 16, 2000 (2836 days; died in office) (Note: Carnahan died in a plane crash while campaigning for a seat in the United States Senate.)	Democratic	1992	Roger B. Wilson
51	Mel Carnahan (1934–2000)	January 11, 1993 – October 16, 2000 (2836 days; died in office)	Democratic	1996	Roger B. Wilson
52	Roger B. Wilson (b. 1948)	October 16, 2000 (Note: The plane crash that killed Carnahan occurred on October 16; his body was not identified until October 18, and shortly thereafter Wilson was sworn in.) – January 8, 2001 (85 days; retired)	Democratic	Succeeded from lieutenant governor	Vacant
52	Roger B. Wilson (b. 1948)	October 16, 2000 – January 8, 2001 (85 days; retired)	Democratic	Succeeded from lieutenant governor	Joe Maxwell (appointed November 15, 2000)
53	Bob Holden (b. 1949)	January 8, 2001 – January 10, 2005 (1464 days; lost nomination) (Note: Holden lost the Democratic nomination to Claire McCaskill.)	Democratic	2000	Joe Maxwell (appointed November 15, 2000)
54	Matt Blunt (b. 1970)	January 10, 2005 – January 12, 2009 (1464 days; retired)	Republican	2004	Peter Kinder
55	Jay Nixon (b. 1956)	January 12, 2009 – January 9, 2017 (2920 days; term-limited)	Democratic	2008	Peter Kinder
55	Jay Nixon (b. 1956)	January 12, 2009 – January 9, 2017 (2920 days; term-limited)	Democratic	2012	Peter Kinder
56	Eric Greitens (b. 1974)	January 9, 2017 – June 1, 2018 (509 days; resigned) (Note: Greitens resigned due to allegations of sexual assault and campaign finance impropriety.)	Republican	2016	Mike Parson
57	Mike Parson (b. 1955)	June 1, 2018 – January 13, 2025 (2419 days; term-limited)	Republican	Succeeded from lieutenant governor	Vacant
57	Mike Parson (b. 1955)	June 1, 2018 – January 13, 2025 (2419 days; term-limited)	Republican	Succeeded from lieutenant governor	Mike Kehoe (appointed June 18, 2018)
57	Mike Parson (b. 1955)	June 1, 2018 – January 13, 2025 (2419 days; term-limited)	Republican	2020	Mike Kehoe (appointed June 18, 2018)
58	Mike Kehoe (b. 1962)	January 13, 2025 – Incumbent (Note: Kehoe's term will expire on January 8, 2029.) (in office 679 days)	Republican	2024	David Wasinger

== Timeline ==
Timeline of Missouri governors

== Confederate governors ==
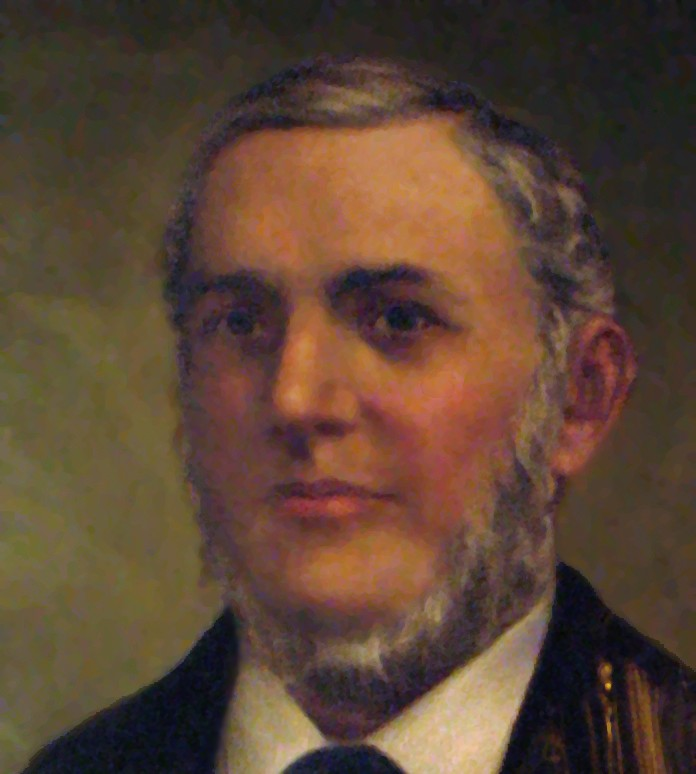
Thomas Caute Reynolds, 2nd Confederate governor of Missouri

During the Civil War, after the capture of Jefferson City by the Union, a constitutional convention declared the office then held by Governor Claiborne Fox Jackson to be vacant. In October, Jackson, Lieutenant Governor Thomas Caute Reynolds, and some members of the General Assembly, organized at Neosho and passed an Ordinance of Secession. This Confederate government never displaced the government in Jefferson City, and Missouri remained in the Union through the entire war. Jackson continued on as governor until his death on December 6, 1862, at which time Reynolds took over, serving until he fled to Mexico in June 1865 after the end of the war.

== See also ==
- Gubernatorial lines of succession in the United States § Missouri
- First ladies of Missouri
- List of lieutenant governors of Missouri
- List of Missouri General Assemblies

== Sources ==
- "Former Missouri Governors". National Governors Association.
- "Missouri History - Governors". Missouri Secretary of State.
- "Missouri Constitution". State Democracy Research Initiative. University of Wisconsin Law School.
- Dubin, Michael J. (2003). United States Gubernatorial Elections, 1776–1860: The Official Results by State and County. McFarland. ISBN 0-7864-1439-1 – via Internet Archive.
- Glashan, Roy R. (1979). American Governors and Gubernatorial Elections, 1775-1978. Meckler Books. ISBN 0-7201-1511-6 – via Internet Archive.
- Kallenbach, Joseph E.; Kallenbach, Jessamine S. (1977). American State Governors, 1776-1976. Oceana Publications. ISBN 978-0-379-00665-0 – via Internet Archive.
- McMullin, Thomas A.; Walker, David (1984). Biographical Directory of American Territorial Governors. Meckler Publishing. ISBN 0-930466-11-X – via Internet Archive.
- Mullaney, Marie Marmo (1994). Biographical Directory of the Governors of the United States, 1988–1994. Greenwood Publishing Group. ISBN 0-313-28312-5 – via Internet Archive.
- Sobel, Robert; Raimo, John (1978). Biographical Directory of the Governors of the United States, 1789-1978. Vol. 2. Meckler Books. ISBN 0-930466-01-2 – via Internet Archive.
- Thorpe, Francis Newton, ed. (1909). The Federal and State Constitutions, Colonial Charters, and Other Organic Laws of the States, Territories, and Colonies Now or Heretofore Forming the United States of America. Vol. 4. United States Government Publishing Office – via Internet Archive.
