= List of elections in 1860 =

The following elections occurred in the year 1860. Most notably, the 1860 United States presidential election was one of the events that precipitated the American Civil War.

== North America ==
=== Central America ===
- 1860 Costa Rican general election
- 1860 Honduran presidential election

=== United States ===
- 1860 New York state election
- 1860 United States elections

==== United States Presidential ====
- 1860 United States presidential election

==== United States Senate ====
- 1860 and 1861 United States Senate elections
- 1860 United States Senate election in Arkansas
- 1860 United States Senate special election in California
- 1860 United States Senate special election in Oregon

==== United States House of Representatives ====
- 1860 United States House of Representatives elections
- 1860 United States House of Representatives election in Florida

==== United States lieutenant gubernatorial ====
- 1860 Connecticut lieutenant gubernatorial election
- 1860 Illinois lieutenant gubernatorial election
- 1860 Missouri lieutenant gubernatorial election

==== United States gubernatorial ====
- 1860 Arkansas gubernatorial election
- 1860 Connecticut gubernatorial election
- 1860 Florida gubernatorial election
- 1860 Illinois gubernatorial election
- 1860 Indiana gubernatorial election
- 1860 Maine gubernatorial election
- 1860 Massachusetts gubernatorial election
- 1860 Michigan gubernatorial election
- 1860 Missouri gubernatorial election
- 1860 New Hampshire gubernatorial election
- 1860 New York gubernatorial election
- 1860 North Carolina gubernatorial election
- 1860 Pennsylvania gubernatorial election
- 1860 Rhode Island gubernatorial election
- 1860 South Carolina gubernatorial election
- 1860 Vermont gubernatorial election

==== United States mayoral elections ====
- 1860 Boston mayoral election
- 1860 Chicago mayoral election
- 1860 Manchester, New Hampshire, mayoral election
- 1860 Philadelphia mayoral election

== Europe ==
=== Malta ===
- 1860 Maltese general election

=== Netherlands ===
- 1860 Dutch general election

=== Switzerland ===
- 1860 Swiss federal election

== South America ==
=== Argentina ===
- 1860 Argentine presidential election

== Oceania ==
=== New Zealand ===
- 1860–1861 New Zealand general election

== See also ==
- Category:1860 elections
