= First ladies of Missouri =

Wives of governors of the U.S. state of Missouri

First Lady of Missouri
- Incumbent; Claudia Kehoe since January 13, 2025
- Inaugural holder: Marguerite de Reilhe
- Formation: 1820
- Website: Missouri's First Lady

First Lady of Missouri is the honorary title attributed to the wife of the governor of Missouri. To date there have been no female governors of Missouri, and all the governors' spouses have been women. The first governor of Missouri was elected and took office in 1820, the year before Missouri was admitted to the Union as the 24th state.

== List of first ladies of Missouri ==
Image	Name	Took office	Left office	Governor of Missouri
	Marguerite Suzanne de Reilhe	1820	1824	Alexander McNair
	Nancy Opie Ball	1824	1825	Frederick Bates
	none (Williams never married)	1825	1826	Abraham J. Williams
	none (Miller never married)	1826	1832	John Miller
	Emily Willis "Pamela" Haley	1832	1836	Daniel Dunklin
	Panthea Grant Boone	1836	1840	Lilburn Boggs
	Eliza Ann Young	1840	1844	Thomas Reynolds
	Lavinia Sappington	1844	1844	Meredith Miles Marmaduke
	none (Edwards not married)	1844	1848	John Cummins Edwards
	Nancy Harris Roberts	1848	1853	Austin Augustus King
	Martha Head	1853	1857	Sterling Price
	Elizabeth Skinner	1857	1857	Trusten Polk
	Ursula Oldham	1857	1857	Hancock Lee Jackson
	none (Stewart never married)	1857	1861	Robert Marcellus Stewart
	Elza Sappington	1861	1861	Claiborne Fox Jackson
	Caroline J. Coalter	1861	1864	Hamilton Rowan Gamble
	unknown	1864	1865	Willard Preble Hall
	Mary Clara Honey	1865	1869	Thomas Clement Fletcher
	Mary Catherine Johnson	1869	1871	Joseph W. McClurg
	Mary Ginn	1871	1873	Benjamin Gratz Brown
	Virginia Juliet Lard	1872	1875	Silas Woodson
	Mary Barr Jenkins	1875	1877	Charles Henry Hardin
	Mary Whitney	1877	1881	John S. Phelps
	Caroline Wheeler "Carrie" Jackson	1881	1885	Thomas Theodore Crittenden
	none (Marmaduke never married)	1885	1887	John S. Marmaduke
	Mattie McFadden	1887	1889	Albert P. Morehouse
	Jane Perry	1889	1893	David R. Francis
	Sarah Louise Winston	1893	1897	William J. Stone
	Margaret Nelson	1897	1901	Lon Vest Stephens
	Mary Elizabeth Bird	1901	1903	Alexander Monroe Dockery
	none (Dockery was widowed)	1903	1905	Alexander Monroe Dockery
	Gertrude Glass	1905	1909	Joseph W. Folk
	Agnes Lee	1909	1913	Herbert S. Hadley
	Elizabeth Myers	1913	1917	Elliot Woolfolk Major
	Jeannette Vosburgh	1917	1921	Frederick D. Gardner
	Hortense Cullers	1921	1925	Arthur M. Hyde
	Nelle Rose Tuckley	1925	1929	Sam Aaron Baker
	Fannie Alice Delano	1929	1933	Henry S. Caulfield
	Eleanora Gabbert	1933	1937	Guy Brasfield Park
	Katherine Lemoine Perkins	1937	1941	Lloyd C. Stark
	Hilda Hays	1941	1945	Forrest C. Donnell
	Juanita McFadden	1945	1949	Phil M. Donnelly
	Mildred Williams	1949	1953	Forrest Smith
	Juanita McFadden	1953	1957	Phil M. Donnelly
	Emilie Chorn	1957	1961	James T. Blair Jr.
	Geraldine Hall	1961	1965	John M. Dalton
	Betty Sue Cooper	1965	1973	Warren E. Hearnes
	Carolyn Reid	1973	1977	Kit Bond
	Theresa Ferkenhoff	1977	1981	Joseph P. Teasdale
	Carolyn Reid	1981	1985	Kit Bond
	Janet E. Ashcroft	1985	1993	John Ashcroft
	Jean Carpenter	1993	2001	Mel Carnahan
	Pat Wilson	2000	2001	Roger B. Wilson
	Lori Hauser	2001	2005	Bob Holden
	Melanie Anderson	2005	2009	Matt Blunt
	Georganne Wheeler	2009	2017	Jay Nixon
	Sheena Elise Chestnut	2017	2018	Eric Greitens
	Teresa Parson	2018	2025	Mike Parson
	Claudia Kehoe	2025	serving	Mike Kehoe
