= List of elections in 1852 =

The following elections occurred in the year 1852.

== Europe ==
- 1852 Belgian general election
- 1852 Danish Folketing election
- 1852 Faroese general election
- 1852 French legislative election
- 1852 Portuguese legislative election

=== United Kingdom ===
- List of MPs elected in the 1852 United Kingdom general election
- 1852 United Kingdom general election
- 1852 United Kingdom general election in Ireland

== North America ==
=== Canada ===
- 1852 Newfoundland general election

=== Central America ===
- 1852 Salvadoran presidential election

=== United States ===
- 1852 New York state election
- 1852 United States elections

==== United States Senate ====
- 1852–53 United States Senate elections
- 1852 United States Senate special election in California

==== United States House of Representatives ====
- 1852 and 1853 United States House of Representatives elections
- 1852 United States House of Representatives election in Florida

==== United States lieutenant gubernatorial ====
- 1852 Connecticut lieutenant gubernatorial election
- 1852 Illinois lieutenant gubernatorial election
- 1852 Missouri lieutenant gubernatorial election

==== United States gubernatorial ====
- 1852 Arkansas gubernatorial election
- 1852 Connecticut gubernatorial election
- 1852 Florida gubernatorial election
- 1852 Illinois gubernatorial election
- 1852 Indiana gubernatorial election
- 1852 Louisiana gubernatorial election
- 1852 Maine gubernatorial election
- 1851-52 Massachusetts gubernatorial election
- 1852-53 Massachusetts gubernatorial election
- 1852 Michigan gubernatorial election
- 1852 Missouri gubernatorial election
- 1852 New Hampshire gubernatorial election
- 1852 New York gubernatorial election
- 1852 North Carolina gubernatorial election
- 1852 Rhode Island gubernatorial election
- 1852 South Carolina gubernatorial election
- 1852 Vermont gubernatorial election

==== United States mayoral elections ====
- 1852 Boston mayoral election
- 1852 Chicago mayoral election
- 1852 Manchester, New Hampshire, mayoral election
- 1852 Philadelphia mayoral election

== See also ==
- Category:1852 elections
