= 1874 Missouri lieutenant gubernatorial election =

- November 3, 1874
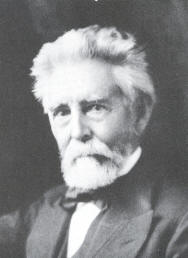

Nominee	Norman Jay Colman	Samuel W. Headlee
Party	Democratic	Populist
Popular vote	149,090	111,414
Percentage	57.23%	42.77%
Lieutenant Governor before election
Charles Phillip Johnson
Liberal Republican
Elected Lieutenant Governor
Norman Jay Colman
Democratic

The 1874 Missouri lieutenant gubernatorial election was held on November 3, 1874, in order to elect the lieutenant governor of Missouri. Democratic nominee Norman Jay Colman defeated People's nominee Samuel W. Headlee.

== General election ==
On election day, November 3, 1874, Democratic nominee Norman Jay Colman won the election by a margin of 37,676 votes against his opponent People's nominee Samuel W. Headlee, thereby gaining Democratic control over the office of lieutenant governor. Colman was sworn in as the 17th lieutenant governor of Missouri on January 12, 1875.

=== Results ===
Missouri lieutenant gubernatorial election, 1874
Party	Candidate	Votes	%
Democratic	Norman Jay Colman	149,090	57.23
Populist	Samuel W. Headlee	111,414	42.77
Total votes		260,504	100.00
Democratic gain from Liberal Republican			

== See also ==
- 1874 Missouri gubernatorial election
