= 1856 Missouri lieutenant gubernatorial election =

- August 4, 1856
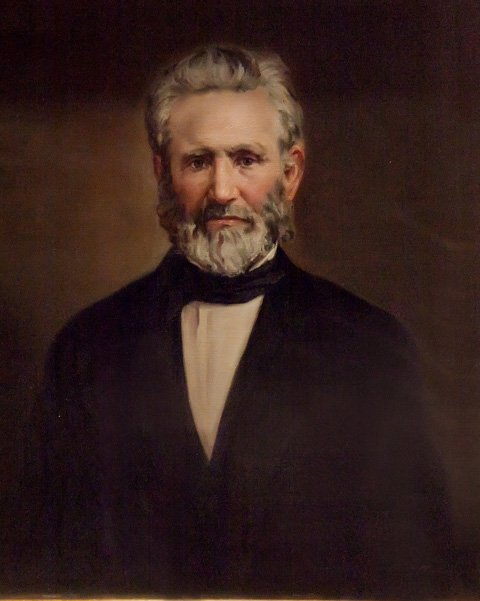
Nominee	Hancock Lee Jackson
Party	Democratic
Popular vote	Unknown
Percentage	100.00%
Lieutenant Governor before election
Wilson Brown
Democratic
Elected Lieutenant Governor
Hancock Lee Jackson
Democratic

The 1856 Missouri lieutenant gubernatorial election was held on August 4, 1856, in order to elect the lieutenant governor of Missouri. Democratic nominee and former member of the Missouri Senate Hancock Lee Jackson won the election as he ran unopposed. The exact results of the election are unknown.

== General election ==
On election day, August 4, 1856, Democratic nominee Hancock Lee Jackson won the election as he ran unopposed, thereby retaining Democratic control over the office of lieutenant governor. Jackson was sworn in as the 10th lieutenant governor of Missouri on January 5, 1857.

=== Results ===
Missouri lieutenant gubernatorial election, 1856
Party	Candidate	Votes	%
Democratic	Hancock Lee Jackson	Unknown	100.00
Total votes		Unknown	100.00
Democratic hold			

== See also ==
- 1856 Missouri gubernatorial election
