= 1852 Missouri lieutenant gubernatorial election =

- August 2, 1852
Nominee	Wilson Brown
Party	Democratic
Popular vote	Unknown
Percentage	100.00%
Lieutenant Governor before election
Thomas L. Price
Democratic
Elected Lieutenant Governor
Wilson Brown
Democratic

The 1852 Missouri lieutenant gubernatorial election was held on August 2, 1852, in order to elect the lieutenant governor of Missouri. Democratic nominee and former member of the Missouri House of Representatives Wilson Brown won the election as he ran unopposed. The exact results of the election are unknown.

== General election ==
On election day, August 2, 1852, Democratic nominee Wilson Brown won the election as he ran unopposed, thereby retaining Democratic control over the office of lieutenant governor. Brown was sworn in as the 9th lieutenant governor of Missouri on January 3, 1853.

=== Results ===
Missouri lieutenant gubernatorial election, 1852
Party	Candidate	Votes	%
Democratic	Wilson Brown	Unknown	100.00
Total votes		Unknown	100.00
Democratic hold			

== See also ==
- 1852 Missouri gubernatorial election
