= Norman Coleman =

Norman Coleman may refer to:

- Norm Coleman (born 1949), United States Senator from Minnesota
- Norman Jay Coleman (1827 – 1911), United States Secretary of Agriculture under President Grover Cleveland in 1889
