= 1874 Missouri Secretary of State election =

- November 3, 1874

Nominee	Michael Knowles McGrath	William R. Leflet
Party	Democratic	Populist
Popular vote	150,495	109,410
Percentage	57.90%	42.10%
Secretary of State before election
Eugene F. Weigel
Democratic
Elected Secretary of State
Michael Knowles McGrath
Democratic

The 1874 Missouri Secretary of State election was held on November 3, 1874, in order to elect the secretary of state of Missouri. Democratic nominee Michael Knowles McGrath defeated People's nominee William R. Leflet.

== General election ==
On election day, November 3, 1874, Democratic nominee Michael Knowles McGrath won the election by a margin of 41,085 votes against his opponent People's nominee William R. Leflet, thereby retaining Democratic control over the office of secretary of state. McGrath was sworn in as the 18th secretary of state of Missouri on January 11, 1875.

=== Results ===
Missouri Secretary of State election, 1874
Party	Candidate	Votes	%
Democratic	Michael Knowles McGrath	150,495	57.90
Populist	William R. Leflet	109,410	42.10
Total votes		259,905	100.00
Democratic hold			

== See also ==
- 1874 Missouri gubernatorial election
