= 1874 Missouri Attorney General election =

- November 3, 1874

Nominee	John A. Hockaday	Daniel S. Twitchell
Party	Democratic	Populist
Popular vote	150,808	110,535
Percentage	57.71%	42.29%
Attorney General before election
Henry Clay Ewing
Democratic
Elected Attorney General
John A. Hockaday
Democratic

The 1874 Missouri Attorney General election was held on November 3, 1874, in order to elect the attorney general of Missouri. Democratic nominee John A. Hockaday defeated People's nominee Daniel S. Twitchell.

== General election ==
On election day, November 3, 1874, Democratic nominee John A. Hockaday won the election by a margin of 40,273 votes against his opponent People's nominee Daniel S. Twitchell, thereby retaining Democratic control over the office of attorney general. Hockaday was sworn in as the 17th attorney general of Missouri on January 11, 1875.

=== Results ===
Missouri Attorney General election, 1874
Party	Candidate	Votes	%
Democratic	John A. Hockaday	150,808	57.71
Populist	Daniel S. Twitchell	110,535	42.29
Total votes		261,343	100.00
Democratic hold			

== See also ==
- 1874 Missouri gubernatorial election
