= Melanie Blunt =

First Lady of Missouri

First Lady of Missouri
- In role January 10, 2005 – January 12, 2009
- Governor: Matt Blunt
- Preceded by: Lori Holden
- Succeeded by: Georgeanne Nixon

Personal details
- Born: Melanie Anderson Middleburg, Virginia, U.S.
- Spouse: Matt Blunt (m. 1997)
- Children: 2

Melanie Anderson Blunt is the wife of former Missouri Governor Matt Blunt, serving as First Lady of Missouri from 2005 to 2009.

During that period, she was the youngest spouse of a U.S. state governor in the United States. She was succeeded as First Lady by Georganne W. Nixon, the wife of Governor Jay Nixon, on January 12, 2009.

== Early life ==
Melanie Anderson was born in Middleburg, Virginia, in Loudoun County and attended James Madison University in Harrisonburg, Virginia, where she graduated summa cum laude with a Bachelor of Science in fashion merchandising. After college, she managed retail stores for The Limited and Talbots and met Matt Blunt during his active service in the U.S. Navy. They were married in 1997 and moved to her husband's hometown of Springfield, Missouri.

Their first son was born two months after his father took office as governor. Their second son was born in 2010.

== Historic preservation efforts ==
Blunt led an initiative to restore the Missouri Governor's Mansion, a Renaissance Revival-style home designed by St. Louis architect George Ingham Barnett and completed in 1871.

Blunt's efforts included successfully lobbying the General Assembly for $3.1 million in funding, as well as hosting a luncheon with the First Ladies, the first-ever event to bring together Missouri's First Ladies for a common cause.

== Charitable works ==
Blunt served as honorary chair of Missouri Citizens for the Arts from 2007 to 2008. She has also taken active leadership roles in Habitat for Humanity and Susan G. Komen Race for the Cure.

Honorary titles
Preceded by Lori Holden	First Lady of Missouri; 2005 – 2009	Succeeded by Georgeanne Nixon
