= 1860 Missouri lieutenant gubernatorial election =

- August 6, 1860
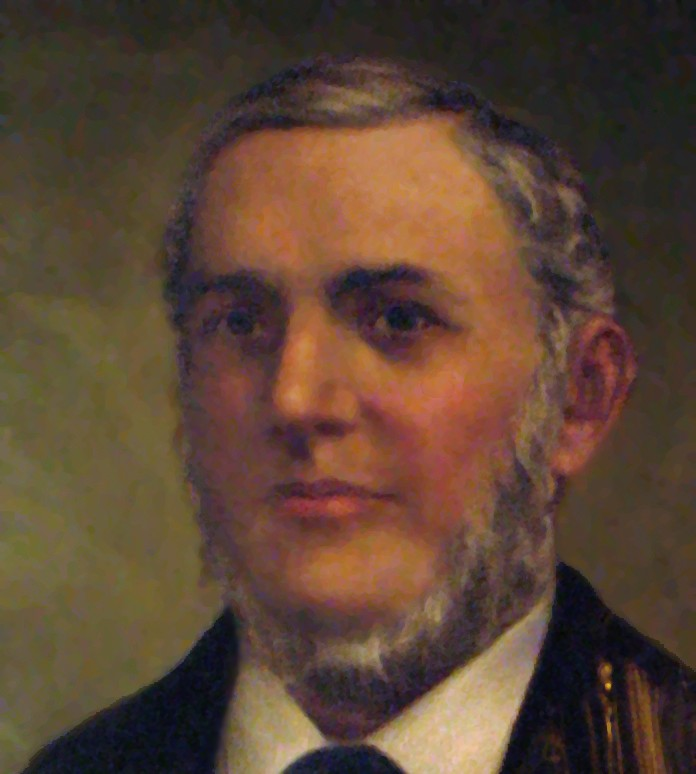

Nominee	Thomas Caute Reynolds	T. J. C. Fagg
Party	Democratic	Constitutional Union
Popular vote	74,549	59,962
Percentage	48.58%	39.07%
Nominee	Monroe Parsons	James Lindsay
Party	Southern Democratic	Republican
Popular vote	10,760	8,196
Percentage	7.01%	5.34%
Lieutenant Governor before election
Hancock Lee Jackson
Democratic
Elected Lieutenant Governor
Thomas Caute Reynolds
Democratic

The 1860 Missouri lieutenant gubernatorial election was held on August 6, 1860, in order to elect the lieutenant governor of Missouri. Democratic nominee Thomas Caute Reynolds defeated Constitutional Union nominee T. J. C. Fagg, Southern Democratic nominee Monroe Parsons and Republican nominee James Lindsay.

== General election ==
On election day, August 6, 1860, Democratic nominee Thomas Caute Reynolds won the election by a margin of 14,587 votes against his foremost opponent Constitutional Union nominee T. J. C. Fagg, thereby retaining Democratic control over the office of lieutenant governor. Reynolds was sworn in as the 11th lieutenant governor of Missouri on January 3, 1861.

=== Results ===
Missouri lieutenant gubernatorial election, 1860
Party	Candidate	Votes	%
Democratic	Thomas Caute Reynolds	74,549	48.58
Constitutional Union	T. J. C. Fagg	59,962	39.07
Southern Democratic	Monroe Parsons	10,760	7.01
Republican	James Lindsay	8,196	5.34
Total votes		153,467	100.00
Democratic hold			

== See also ==
- 1860 Missouri gubernatorial election
