= Charles Hardin =

Charles Hardin is the name of:

- Buddy Holly (1936–1959), born Charles Hardin Holley, American singer, songwriter, and a pioneer of rock and roll; his songs are credited to Charles Hardin
- Charles Henry Hardin (1820–1892), 22nd governor of Missouri and one of the eight founders of Beta Theta Pi fraternity
