= 1874 Missouri State Auditor election =

- November 3, 1874

Nominee	Thomas Holloday	Ewen C. Hale
Party	Democratic	Populist
Popular vote	150,749	109,864
Percentage	57.84%	42.16%
State Auditor before election
George Boardman Clark
Democratic
Elected State Auditor
Thomas Holloday
Democratic

The 1874 Missouri State Auditor election was held on November 3, 1874, in order to elect the state auditor of Missouri. Democratic nominee Thomas Holloday defeated People's nominee Ewen C. Hale.

== General election ==
On election day, November 3, 1874, Democratic nominee Thomas Holloday won the election by a margin of 40,885 votes against his opponent People's nominee Ewen C. Hale, thereby retaining Democratic control over the office of state auditor. Holloday was sworn in as the 17th state auditor of Missouri on January 11, 1875.

=== Results ===
Missouri State Auditor election, 1874
Party	Candidate	Votes	%
Democratic	Thomas Holloday	150,749	57.84
Populist	Ewen C. Hale	109,864	42.16
Total votes		260,613	100.00
Democratic hold			

== See also ==
- 1874 Missouri gubernatorial election
