= Electoral reform in Missouri =

Electoral reform in Missouri encompasses a range of legislative and policy changes aimed at modifying the state's electoral processes. These reforms have addressed issues such as voter identification requirements, ballot initiatives, voting methods, and redistricting procedures.

== Voter ID laws and legal challenges ==
Missouri has implemented stringent voter identification laws. In 2022, House Bill 1878 was signed into law, mandating photo identification for voters and introducing other election-related provisions. In November 2024, a Missouri judge struck down four provisions of this law, citing concerns over voter suppression and the criminalization of certain civic engagement activities.

== Ballot initiatives and constitutional amendments ==
Missouri has a history of utilizing ballot initiatives to enact policy changes. Between 1910 and 2022, 95 ballot initiatives appeared before Missouri voters, with 43 passing. In recent years, efforts have been made to modify the process for amending the state constitution, including Senate Joint Resolution 74, which proposed requiring constitutional amendments to receive a majority vote statewide and in a majority of congressional districts.

== Voting methods and local reforms ==
In 2020, St. Louis adopted a unified primary system utilizing approval voting, allowing voters to select all candidates they approve of, with the top two advancing to a runoff. This system was first used in the 2021 mayoral election. Despite attempts to repeal it, the system remains in place due to voter support and legal protections.

In 2024, the Missouri legislature passed a resolution to bar ranked-choice and approval voting voting in most of the state, with an exemption for St. Louis, which had recently implemented a form of approval voting.

== Redistricting and the "Clean Missouri" Initiative ==
In 2018, Missouri voters approved the "Clean Missouri" amendment, aiming to reduce gerrymandering by establishing a nonpartisan demographer for legislative redistricting. But in 2020, voters passed Amendment 3, repealing key aspects of "Clean Missouri," returning redistricting authority to bipartisan commissions appointed by political parties and setting back the reform effort.

Subsequent legal challenges tested the revised redistricting criteria. In 2023, a Missouri judge upheld the constitutionality of the new state Senate districts, emphasizing the importance of compactness over maintaining political subdivisions.

== Recent legislative actions ==
In April 2025, Governor Mike Kehoe signed into law two pieces of legislation concerning electoral procedures:

- Senate Bill 22 (2025) proposes changes to the process of drafting and challenging ballot measure summaries. Under the bill, the General Assembly is allowed to include official summary statements and fiscal notes in statewide ballot measures referred to voters. Supporters argue that SB 22 ensures that ballot summaries are impartial and accurately reflect the intent of proposed measures. Critics contend that SB 22 could undermine the integrity of the ballot initiative process by allowing political influence over summary language.
- Senate Bill 47 (2025) amends Supreme Court Rule 52.08 to align the state's class action procedures with the Federal Rules of Civil Procedure, particularly Rule 23.

== Federal influence on state reforms ==
Missouri officials expressed support for President Trump's March 2025 Executive Order titled Preserving and Protecting the Integrity of American Elections. The order mandates proof of citizenship for voter registration in federal elections.

== See also ==
- Elections in Missouri
- Voter identification laws in the United States
- Redistricting
- Approval voting
