= 1857 Missouri gubernatorial special election =

- August 7, 1857
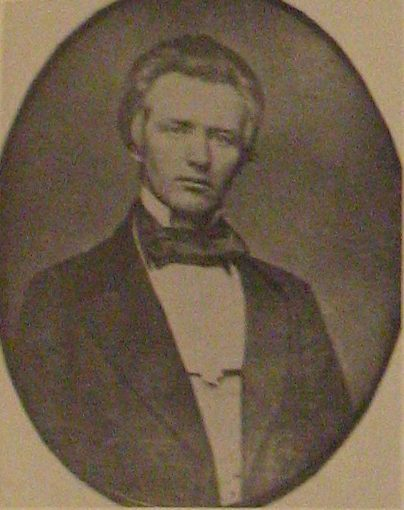

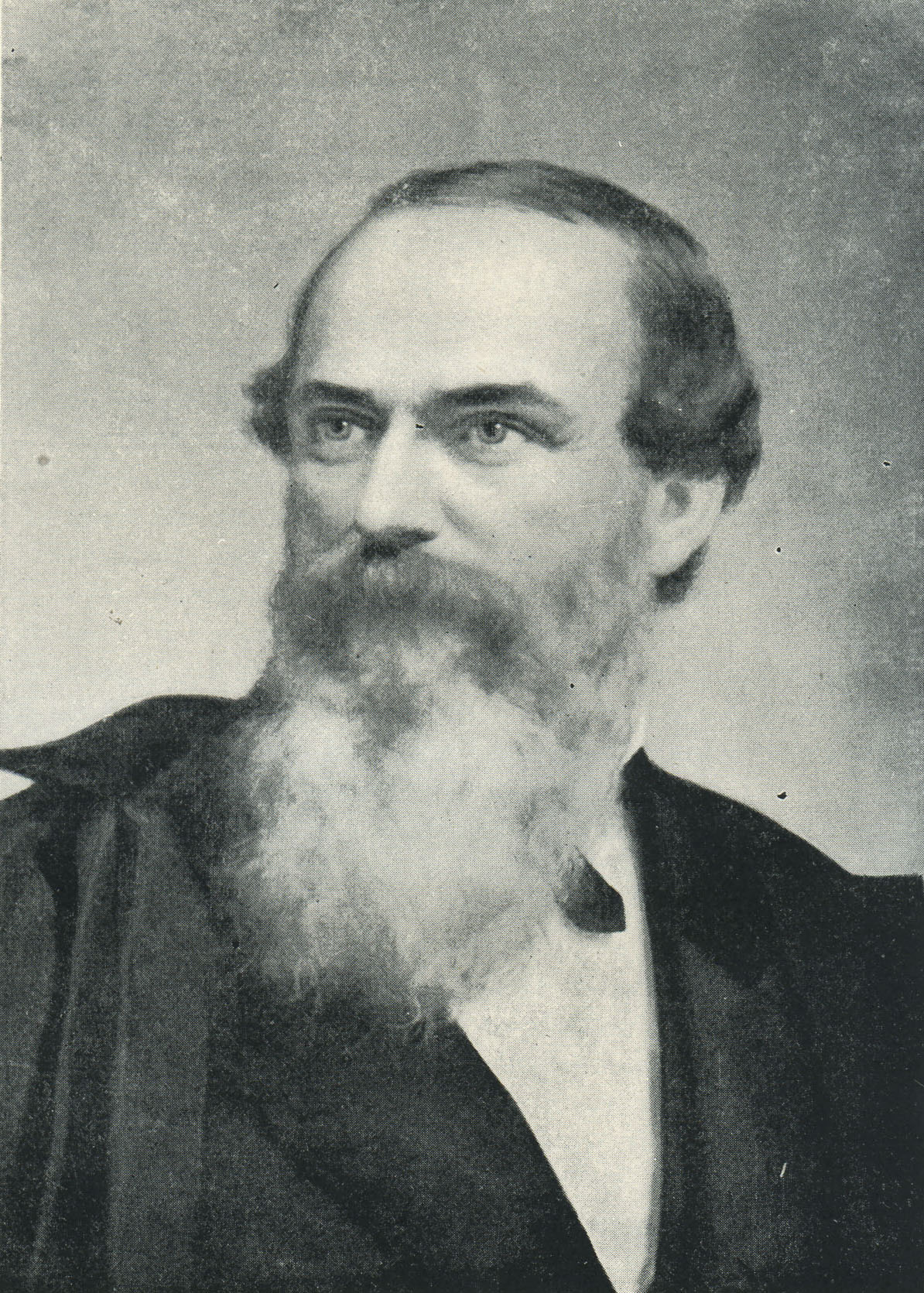
Nominee	Robert Marcellus Stewart	James S. Rollins
Party	Democratic	Know Nothing
Popular vote	47,975	47,641
Percentage	50.18%	49.82%
- County results Stewart: 50–60% 60–70% 70–80% 80–90% >90% Rollins: 50–60% 60–70% 70–80% No Data
Governor before election
Hancock Lee Jackson
Democratic
Elected Governor
Robert Marcellus Stewart
Democratic

The 1857 Missouri gubernatorial special election was held on August 7, 1857. The election was called to fill the remainder of the term of Trusten Polk, who had resigned in February 1857 upon his election to the United States Senate. In the special election, held on August 7, 1857, the Democratic nominee, Robert Marcellus Stewart, defeated Know-Nothing candidate James S. Rollins (running under the American Party label) by a margin of only 334 votes. This was Rollins' second run for Governor of Missouri, having also lost in the 1848 gubernatorial election.

== Results ==
1857 gubernatorial special election, Missouri
Party	Candidate	Votes	%	±%
Democratic	Robert Marcellus Stewart	47,975	50.18	+9.39
Know Nothing	James S. Rollins	47,641	49.82	+14.59
Majority		334	0.36	−5.20
Turnout		95,616	14.02	
Democratic hold		Swing		
