= Panthea Boone Boggs =

First Lady of Missouri from 1836 until 1840

First Lady of Missouri
- In role 1836–1840
- Governor: Lilburn Boggs
- Preceded by: Emily "Pamela" Dunklin
- Succeeded by: Eliza Ann Reynolds

Personal details
- Born: September 20, 1801
- Died: September 23, 1880 (aged 79)

Panthea Grant Boone Boggs (September 20, 1801 – September 23, 1880) was the First Lady of Missouri from 1836 until 1840. She was also a granddaughter of American pioneer Daniel Boone. She was married to Lilburn Boggs who served as the sixth Governor of Missouri from 1836 to 1840. They spent the first 23 years of their marriage living in Jackson County, Missouri. After Boggs served as governor, they moved to California in 1846 where they planned to retire, but where the former governor served as alcalde, local postmaster, and in the California state assembly.

Honorary titles
Preceded by Emily "Pamela" Dunklin	First Lady of Missouri; 1836–1840	Succeeded by Eliza Ann Reynolds
