= 1852 Faroese general election =

Danish territorial election

General elections were held in the Faroe Islands in 1852 after the Løgting was reconstituted. Sixteen members were elected from seven constituencies, with the Danish administrator (Amtmaður) and the local dean (Próstur) also serving as members. The administrator was the speaker.

== Electoral system ==
One third of the members were to be elected every two years. The franchise was limited to men aged 30 or over.

== Results ==
Constituency	Elected members
Eysturoy	Daniel Peder Christiansen
Eysturoy	Niels Winther
Eysturoy	Peter Hans Sivertsen
Norðurstreymoy	Jens Hendrik Djurhuus
Norðurstreymoy	Johan Olsen
Norðoyggjar	Guttorm Absalonsen
Norðoyggjar	Hans David Matras
Sandoy	Hans Jacob Jørgen Sørensen
Sandoy	Mads Andrias Winther
Suðuroy	Hans Djurhuus
Suðuroy	Daniel J. Mortensen
Suðurstreymoy	Andreas Djurhuus
Suðurstreymoy	Hans Christopher Müller
Suðurstreymoy	Napoleon Nolsøe
Vágar	Poul Edward Lange
Vágar	Jacob Zachariasen
Source: Løgting

=== By constituency ===
Norðurstreymoy
Candidate	Votes	%
Jens Hendrik Djurhuus	58	32.95
Johan Olsen	41	23.30
Jens Christian Djurhuus	39	22.16
Johannes Joensen	16	9.09
Carl Vilhelm Prütz	15	8.52
Hans Christopher Müller	3	1.70
Ole Hansen	2	1.14
Johan Henrik Jacobsen	1	0.57
Thomas Egholm	1	0.57
Total	176	100.00
Total votes	88	–
Registered voters/turnout	152	57.89
Source: Løgting
