= 1860 Honduran presidential election =

Presidential elections were held in Honduras in 1860. The result was a victory for José Santos Guardiola, who became the first president elected solely on the basis of the popular vote.

== Results ==
The elections were a contest between conservative incumbent José Santos Guardiola and his liberal vice president José María Lazo Guillén. Guardiola was elected with 90% of the vote.

Candidate	Votes	%
José Santos Guardiola	20,531	89.76
José María Lazo Guillén	2,342	10.24
Total	22,873	100.00
Source: The Library, UC San Diego

== Aftermath ==
Following the elections, the General Chamber elected Victoriano Castellanos as vice president. Guardiola and Castellanos took office on 7 February.
