= 1860 Connecticut lieutenant gubernatorial election =

- April 4, 1860
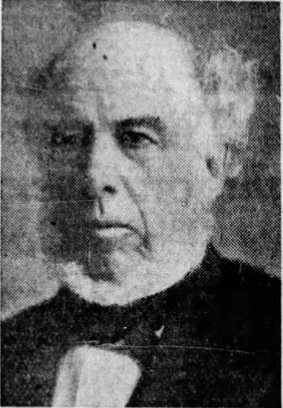

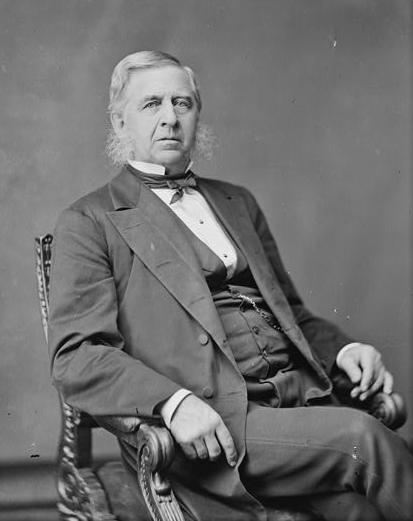
Nominee	Julius Catlin	James E. English
Party	Republican	Democratic
Popular vote	44,453	43,846
Percentage	50.00%	49.30%
Lieutenant Governor before election
Julius Catlin
Republican
Elected Lieutenant Governor
Julius Catlin
Republican

The 1860 Connecticut lieutenant gubernatorial election was held on April 4, 1860, to elect the lieutenant governor of Connecticut. Incumbent Republican lieutenant governor Julius Catlin won re-election against Democratic nominee and former member of the Connecticut Senate James E. English.

== General election ==
On election day, April 4, 1860, incumbent Republican lieutenant governor Julius Catlin won re-election with 50.00% of the vote, thereby retaining Republican control over the office of lieutenant governor. Catlin was sworn in for his third term on May 2, 1860.

=== Results ===
Connecticut lieutenant gubernatorial election, 1860
Party	Candidate	Votes	%
Republican	Julius Catlin (incumbent)	44,453	50.00
Democratic	James E. English	43,846	49.30
	Scattering	613	0.70
Total votes		88,912	100.00
Republican hold			
