= Silas Woodson =

American politician (1819–1896)

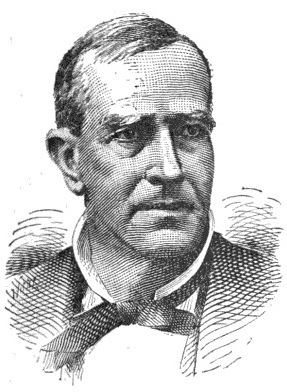

21st Governor of Missouri
- In office January 3, 1873 – January 12, 1875
- Lieutenant: Charles Phillip Johnson
- Preceded by: B. Gratz Brown
- Succeeded by: Charles Henry Hardin

Chief Justice of the Idaho Territorial Supreme Court
- In office July 28, 1864 – January 1865
- Appointed by: Abraham Lincoln
- Preceded by: Sidney Edgerton
- Succeeded by: John R. McBride

Personal details
- Born: May 18, 1819 Barbourville Kentucky, U.S
- Died: October 9, 1896 (aged 77) St. Joseph, Missouri, Missouri, U.S
- Party: Democratic
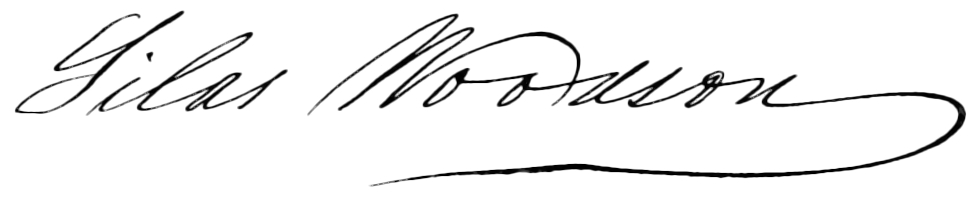
- Signature

Silas Woodson (May 18, 1819 – October 9, 1896) was an American politician who served as the 21st governor of Missouri between January 3, 1873, and January 12, 1875. He was notable for being the first Democrat elected to that position since the American Civil War. No Republican would reach the office for over 30 years after Woodson's election.

== Early life ==
Woodson was born in Barbourville, Kentucky, to mother Alice (Chick), and father Wade Netherland Woodson

He was the most outspoken opponent of slavery at Kentucky's 1849 constitutional convention and left the state after the passage of the 1850 constitution enshrined it in state law.

== Legal career ==
Woodson became a lawyer. In 1846 he became partners with Samuel Freeman Miller. Woodson gained a reputation as a trial lawyer. On June 20, 1864, President Abraham Lincoln nominated Woodson as Chief Justice of the Idaho Territorial Supreme Court. The senate judiciary committee reported Woodson's nomination adversely, and the senate laid his nomination on the table on June 30. After congress adjourned, Lincoln gave Woodson a recess appointment to the position on July 28, 1864. He resigned his commission in January 1865, without having set foot in the Idaho Territory.

== Political career ==
Woodson had made one previously unsuccessful attempt for the Missouri Legislature in 1868, but was chosen to run in 1873 against Republican Senator John B. Henderson. Woodson beat Henderson 156,777 votes to 121,889.

In his inaugural address, Governor Woodson spoke about education, in particular defending the Democratic position regarding common schools. Historian Arthur Lee commented this showed the institutionalization of public schooling in Missouri.

As part of his time as governor, Woodson brought a case against Pacific Railroad for non-payment of a state-issued debt. The Railroad had contended that it was unable to repay $2 million lent to it due to the impact of the Civil War. Woodson had responded by attempting a sale of the Railroad in default. In the 1874 case of Woodson v Murdock, the Supreme Court found in favor of the Railroad.

In 1875, Silas Woodson was briefly investigated for his role in co-signing certificates issued during the Civil War by the Crafton Commission. Woodson owned $198,045 worth of the certificates personally. He was exonerated after it was shown that Crafton had been forging then-Governor Woodson's signature on certificates for defective muster rolls.

== Death ==
Woodson died in St. Joseph, Missouri. He is buried there at the Mount Mora Cemetery. His headstone was vandalized in October 2006.

Party political offices
Preceded by B. Gratz Brown	Democratic nominee for Governor of Missouri; 1872	Succeeded by Charles Henry Hardin
Political offices
Preceded by B. Gratz Brown	Governor of Missouri; 1873–1875	Succeeded by Charles Henry Hardin
