= 1860 United States Senate election in Arkansas =

- December 20, 1860

Members of the Arkansas General Assembly Majority of voting members needed to win
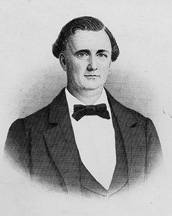

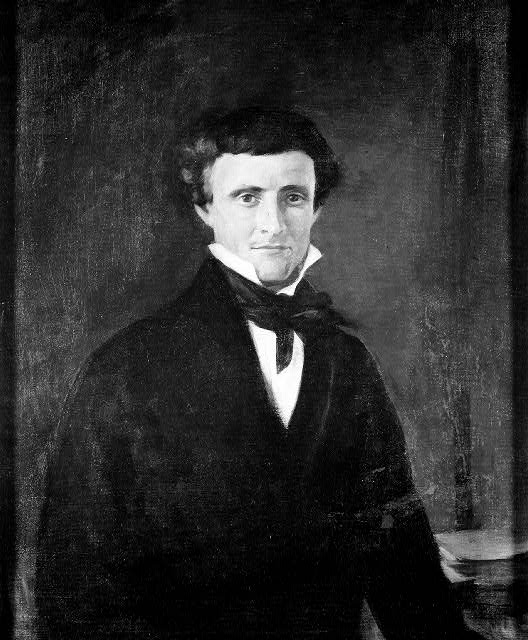
Nominee	Charles B. Mitchel	Samuel H. Hempstead	George C. Watkins
Party	Democratic	Democratic	Democratic
1st ballot	27 (29.7%)	33 (33.0%)	23 (25.3%)
9th ballot	52 (55.9%)	26 (28.0%)	8 (8.6%)
Senator before election
Robert W. Johnson
Democratic
Elected Senator
Charles B. Mitchel
Democratic

A senatorial election was held in Arkansas on December 20, 1860, as part of the 1860–61 United States Senate elections. The Democratic former Arkansas representative Charles B. Mitchel defeated Samuel H. Hempstead and the former chief justice of the Arkansas Supreme Court George C. Watkins.

The incumbent senator Robert W. Johnson did not seek re-election. The Arkansas General Assembly met on December 20, 1860, to elect Johnson's successor. Democrats Charles B. Mitchel, Samuel H. Hempstead, N. B. Burrow, and George C. Watkins were nominated as candidates. Burrow, a secessionist, declined to be considered; the remaining candidates were notably cautious in their responses to Lincoln's election.

Mitchel was elected with 52 votes on the ninth ballot. He subsequently was expelled from Congress on July 11, 1861, following the secession of Arkansas.

== General election ==
1860 United States Senate election in Arkansas
Party	Candidate	1st ballot	2nd ballot	3rd ballot	4th ballot	5th ballot	6th ballot	7th ballot	8th ballot	9th ballot
Democratic	Charles B. Mitchel	27	31	33	35	37	39	41	44	52
Democratic	Samuel H. Hempstead	33	34	33	32	31	28	28	28	26
Democratic	George C. Watkins	23	22	22	22	21	19	19	16	8
Democratic	Robert W. Johnson	2	2	2	1	1	—N/a			2
	C. F. Hemingway	—N/a								1
Democratic	John S. Roane	1	1	1	1	1	1	1	1	1
	S. M. Scott	—N/a								1
Constitutional Union	Hugh F. Thomason	—N/a								1
	John T. Trigg	—N/a								1
Democratic	N. B. Burrow	3	1	1	—N/a					
	George W. Lemoyne	2	1	1	—N/a	1	1	—N/a		
	John H. Askew	—N/a			1	—N/a				
Democratic	Albert Pike	—N/a			1	1	1	1	1	—N/a
Total votes		91	92	93	93	93	89	90	90	93
Votes needed to win		48	48	48	48	48	47	49	47	48

== Bibliography ==
- Arkansas (1861). Journal of the House of Representatives [...]. n.p.
- Congressional Quarterly (1985). Congressional Quarterly's Guide to U.S. Elections (2nd ed.). Washington D.C.: Congressional Quarterly. ISBN 978-0-87187-339-2.
- Ferguson, John F. (1965). Arkansas and the Civil War. [Little Rock, AR]: [Pioneer Press]. LCCN 64-25874.
