= 1820 Missouri gubernatorial election =

- August 28, 1820
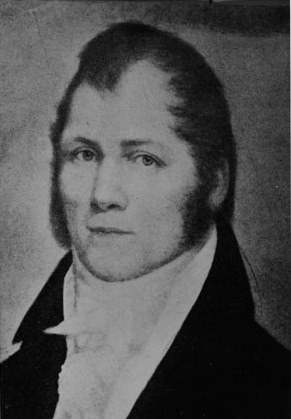

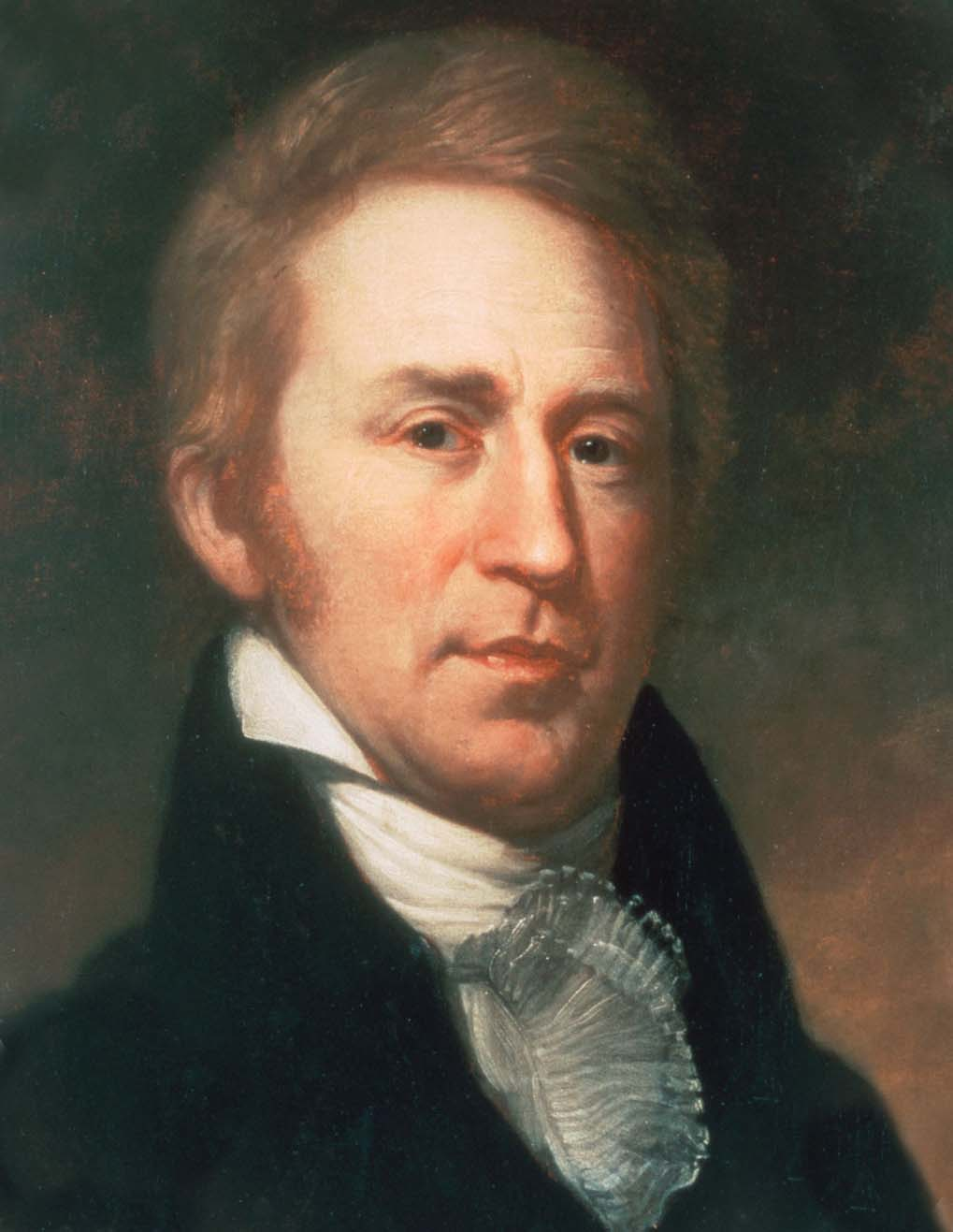
Nominee	Alexander McNair	William Clark
Party	Democratic-Republican	Democratic-Republican
Popular vote	6,576	2,556
Percentage	72.01%	27.99%
- County results McNair: 50–60% 60–70% 70–80% 80–90% 90–100% Clark: 60–70% No Data/Vote
Governor before election
William Clark
Democratic-Republican
Elected Governor
Alexander McNair
Democratic-Republican

The 1820 Missouri gubernatorial election was Missouri's first gubernatorial election due to it becoming a state. In the election, which was held on August 28, 1820, territorial governor William Clark was defeated by Alexander McNair. Clark was disliked by many Missourians due to accusations that he was too accommodating to indigenous peoples and thus lost to his fellow Democratic-Republican challenger Alexander McNair.
