= 1872 Missouri gubernatorial election =

- November 5, 1872
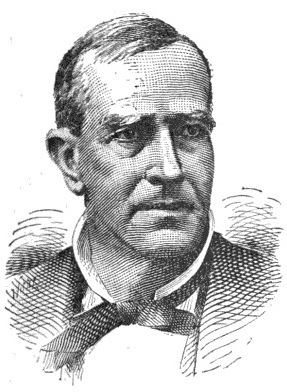

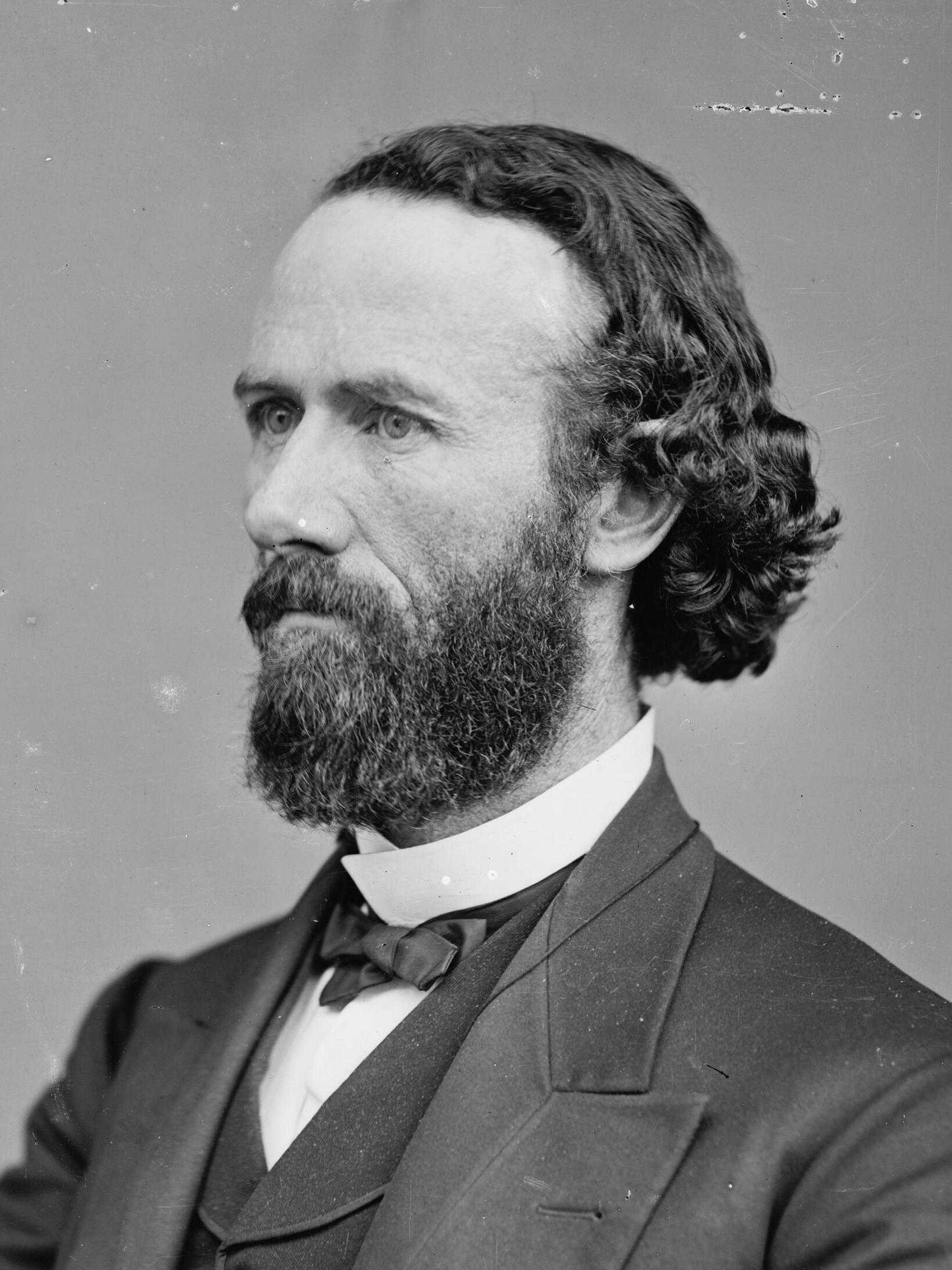
Nominee	Silas Woodson	John B. Henderson
Party	Democratic	Republican
Popular vote	156,767	121,889
Percentage	56.26%	43.74%
- County results Woodson: 50–60% 60–70% 70–80% 80–90% 90–100% Henderson: 50–60% 60–70% 70–80% No Data/Vote
Governor before election
Benjamin Gratz Brown
Liberal Republican
Elected Governor
Silas Woodson
Democratic

The 1872 Missouri gubernatorial election was held on November 5, 1872, and resulted in a victory for the Democratic nominee, Silas Woodson, over the Republican candidate, former Senator John B. Henderson.

== Results ==
1872 gubernatorial election, Missouri
Party	Candidate	Votes	%	±%
Democratic	Silas Woodson	156,767	56.26	+56.26
Republican	John B. Henderson	121,889	43.74	+6.01
Majority		34,878	12.52	−12.02
Turnout		278,656	16.19	
Democratic gain from Liberal Republican		Swing		
