= 1856 Missouri gubernatorial election =

- August 4, 1856
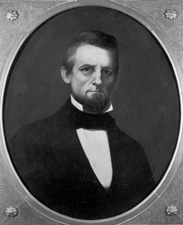

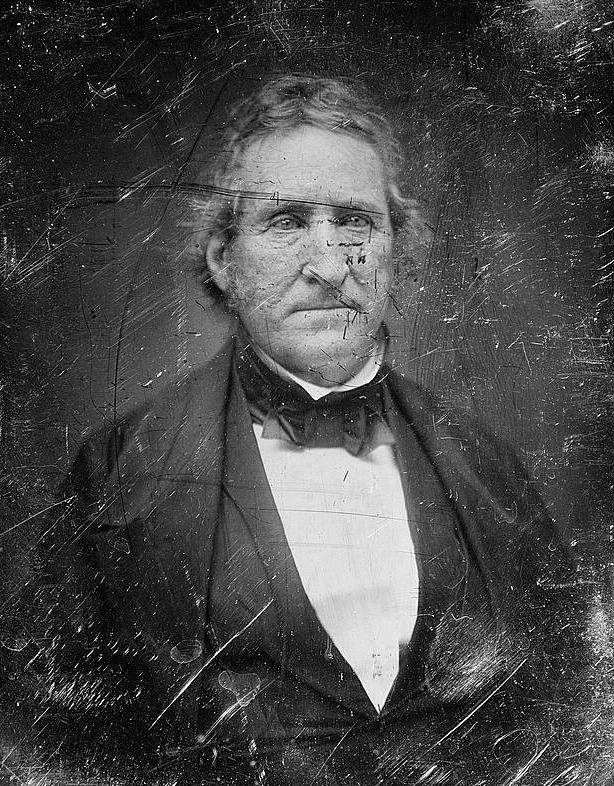
Nominee	Trusten Polk	Robert C. Ewing	Thomas H. Benton
Party	Democratic	Know Nothing	Independent Democrat
Popular vote	46,993	40,589	27,618
Percentage	40.79%	35.23%	23.97%
- County Results; Polk: 30–40% 40–50% 50–60% 60–70% 70–80% 80–90% >90% Ewing: 30–40% 40–50% 50–60% 60–70% Benton: 30–40% 40–50% 50–60% 60–70% 70–80% No Data
Governor before election
Sterling Price
Democratic
Elected Governor
Trusten Polk
Democratic

The 1856 Missouri gubernatorial election was held on August 2, 1852, the Democratic nominee, Trusten Polk, defeated Know-Nothing candidate Robert C. Ewing (running under the American Party label), and former Senator Thomas H. Benton. Benton ran as an Independent Democrat under the label "Benton Democrat."

In February 1857, Trusten Polk would be elected to the United States Senate; he therefore resigned the governorship, was replaced by Lt. Gov. Hancock Lee Jackson, and forced a special election to be called for August 1857 to fill the remainder of the term.

== General election ==
=== Candidates ===
- Thomas Hart Benton, former U.S. Senator (1821–51) and U.S. Representative (1853–55) from St. Louis (Benton Democratic)
- Robert C. Ewing (American)
- Trusten Polk, St. Louis attorney (Democratic)

=== Results ===
1856 gubernatorial election, Missouri
Party	Candidate	Votes	%	±%
Democratic	Trusten Polk	46,993	40.79	−17.93
Know Nothing	Robert C. Ewing	40,589	35.23	+35.23
"Benton Democrat"	Thomas H. Benton	27,618	23.97	+23.97
Majority		6,404	5.56	−11.88
Turnout		115,200	16.89	
Democratic hold		Swing		
