= Charles Henry Hardin =

American governor (1820–1892)

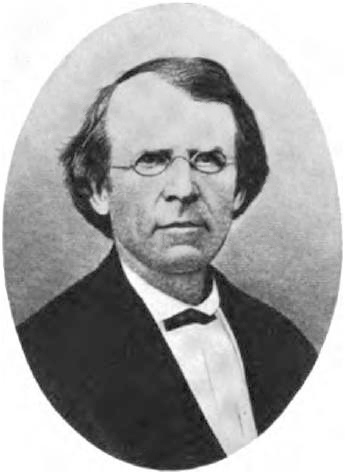

22nd Governor of Missouri
- In office January 12, 1875 – January 8, 1877
- Lieutenant: Norman Jay Coleman
- Preceded by: Silas Woodson
- Succeeded by: John Smith Phelps

Missouri Senate 9th District
- In office 1860–1862
- In office 1872–1874

Missouri House of Representatives
- In office 1852–1856
- In office 1858–1860

Personal details
- Born: July 15, 1820 Trimble County, Kentucky, U.S.
- Died: July 29, 1892 (aged 72) Mexico, Missouri, U.S.
- Party: Democratic
- Education: Indiana University Bloomington; Miami University
- Profession: Lawyer

Charles Henry Hardin (July 15, 1820 – July 29, 1892) was an American attorney and politician who was the 22nd governor of Missouri served in the Missouri Senate and the Missouri House of Representatives. He founded Hardin College and was one of the eight founders of Beta Theta Pi fraternity.

== Early life ==
In 1820, Charles Henry Hardin was born to Charles and Hannah Jewell Hardin in Trimble County, Kentucky. Also in 1820, his family moved to Missouri and eventually settled in Columbia, Missouri. Following his father's death in 1830, Hardin worked in the family's tannery business.

Hardin began his secondary education in 1837 at the Indiana University Bloomington. He transferred to Miami University in 1839 and graduated in 1841. During his time at Miami University, he helped to found Beta Theta Pi fraternity.

After college, he studied law with James M. Gordon in Columbia and passed the Bar.

== Career ==
Hardin opened a law practice in Fulton, Missouri in 1843. From 1848 to 1852, he was a circuit attorney for the Second Judicial Circuit of Missouri. He served in the Missouri House of Representatives, with terms starting in 1852, 1854, and 1858. He was a Democrat. He was a member of the commission that revised and codified the state's statute laws.

In 1860, he was elected to the Missouri Senate 9th District, with a term lasting until 1862. As a state senator, he attended Claiborne Fox Jackson's secessionist meeting in Neosho, Missouri and was the only senator present to vote against secession.

During the Civil War, he returned to the family farm in Audrain County, Missouri in 1862. After the war, Hardin and his family moved to Mexico, Missouri, where he established a new law practice and co-founded Mexico Southern Bank following the close of the war.

In 1872, Hardin was again elected to the state senate for a term lasting until 1874. In 1876, he was a delegate to the Democratic National Convention from Missouri.

He ran for governor of Missouri and was elected on November 5, 1874. He served as 22nd Governor of Missouri between January 1, 1875, and February 8, 1877. During his term, a new constitution was approved. Hardin also reduced Missouri's debt from the Civil War and state funding for railroad expansion by ending wasteful practices and refinancing bonds.

Hardin established Hardin College and Conservatory of Music in Mexico, Missouri. In 1873, Hardin gave land worth $60,000 to the college and afterward served as the president of its board.

== Personal life ==
Hardin married Mary Barr Jenkins in 1844.

Late in life, Hardin was in poor health. In 1892, he died from conditions relating to old age in Ringo House in Mexico, Missouri. He was initially buried in a private graveyard in Audrain County, Missouri, but was later re-buried at the Jewell family cemetery in Columbia, Missouri.

== Honors ==
Charles H. Hardin is the namesake of the small city of Hardin, Missouri.

Party political offices
Preceded by Silas Woodson	Democratic nominee for Governor of Missouri; 1874	Succeeded by John S. Phelps
Political offices
Preceded by Silas Woodson	Governor of Missouri; 1875–1877	Succeeded by John Smith Phelps
