= Trusten Polk =

American politician (1811–1876)

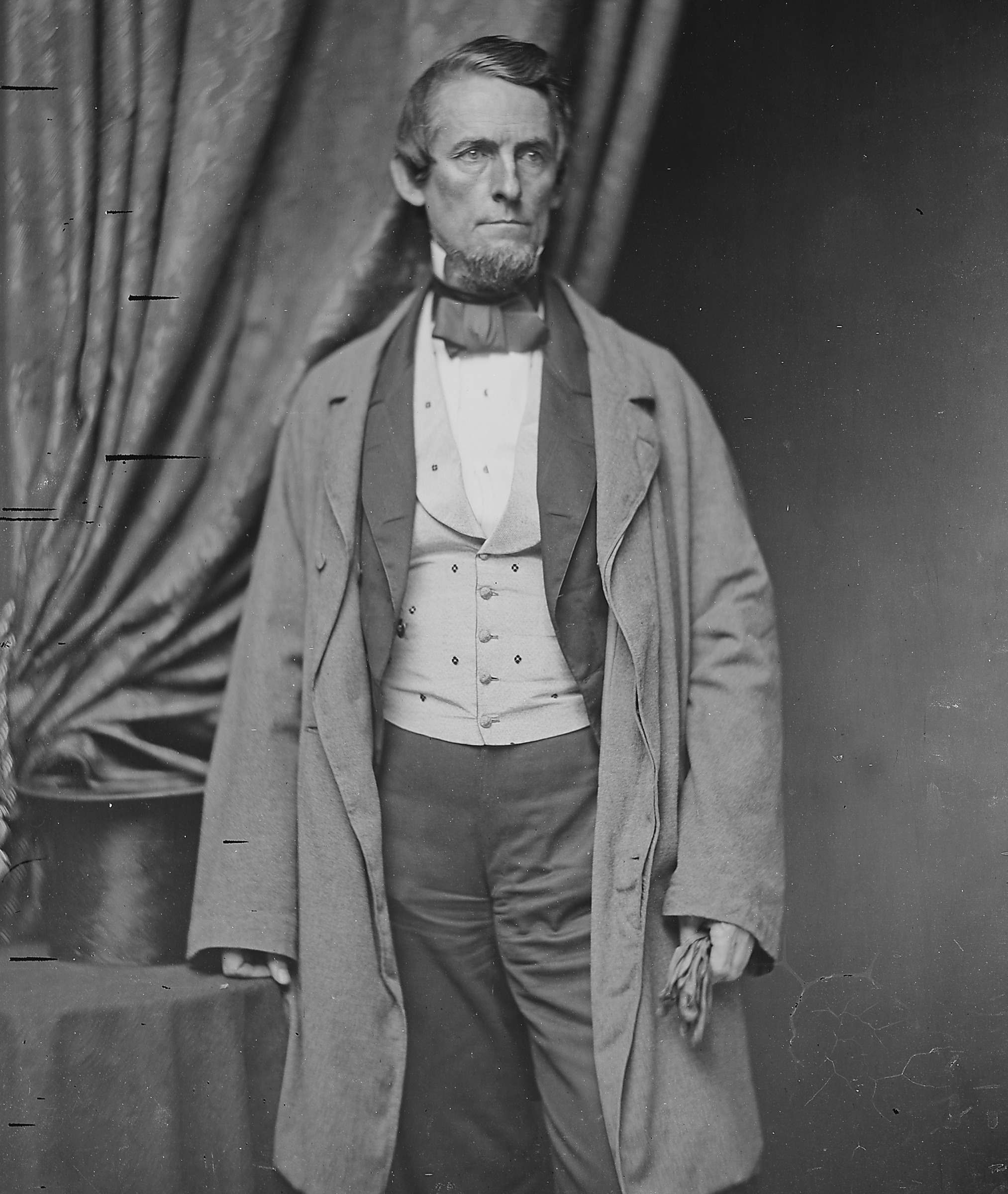
- c. 1860 – c. 1865 portrait of Polk, by Mathew Brady

United States Senator from Missouri
- In office March 4, 1857 – January 10, 1862
- Preceded by: Henry S. Geyer
- Succeeded by: John B. Henderson

12th Governor of Missouri
- In office January 5, 1857 – February 27, 1857
- Lieutenant: Hancock Lee Jackson
- Preceded by: Sterling Price
- Succeeded by: Hancock Lee Jackson

Personal details
- Born: May 29, 1811 Bridgeville, Delaware, U.S.
- Died: April 16, 1876 (aged 64) St. Louis, Missouri, U.S.
- Party: Democratic
- Spouse: Elizabeth Skinner
- Education: Yale University (BA)

Military service
- Allegiance: Confederate States
- Branch/service: Confederate States Army
- Rank: Colonel
- Unit: Missouri State Guard
- Battles/wars: American Civil War

Trusten W. Polk (May 29, 1811 – April 16, 1876) was an American politician. He served as 12th governor of Missouri in 1857, and was a member of the United States Senate from Missouri, from 1857 to 1862.

== Early life and law career ==
Polk was born on May 29, 1811, in Bridgeville, Delaware, to William Nutter Polk and Levinia Causey Polk. He was a member of the Polk family and distant cousin of President James K. Polk. He first attended common schools, graduating from Yale College in 1831. He planned to become a minister, though his father suggested he become a lawyer. He studied law under Delaware Attorney General James Rogers and attended Yale Law School for two years. In 1835, he was admitted to the bar.

In 1835, Polk moved to St. Louis. There, he practiced law, serving as St. Louis City Counselor in 1843. He also helped Governor Henry S. Geyer in the establishment of the University of Missouri School of Medicine. Between 1835 and fall 1845, he left Missouri due to illness, during which he studied education in other regions of North America.

== Political career and military service ==
Polk also involved himself in politics as a Democrat. In 1845, was a delegate to the Missouri State constitutional convention, then in 1848 was a Missouri Democratic presidential elector. In 1854, he unsuccessfully ran for the United States House of Representatives.

Polk was inaugurated as governor of Missouri from January 5, 1857. He served until February 27, resigning in order to be seated in the United States Senate. His tenure as Governor is the shortest in Missouri history, at 53 days. He served as Senator beginning on March 4, 1857. On January 10, 1862, he and fellow Missouri Senator Waldo P. Johnson were expelled due to their support of the Confederate States of America during the American Civil War.

Polk was a supporter of temperance movement, with him heading a temperance group beginning in 1836. He also supported hard currency. He was a slaveowner and was the first Missouri Governor to actively support slavery, though he more actively supported it while in the Senate. Though from Missouri, he was a member of the "Central Clique", a group of conservative politicians from the loosely-defined Mid-Missouri.

After his expulsion from the Senate, Polk served in the Missouri State Guard and was ranked colonel. During the war, his family was exiled from St. Louis. In 1863, he was captured by Union Army forces and imprisoned at Johnson's Island; he became ill while imprisoned. He was later released, in exchange for a Union prisoner in Mississippi. Through 1864 and 1865, he served as a judge in Mississippi's court-martial.

== Person life and death ==
After the war, Polk moved to Mexico for some time. He returned to St. Louis to reunite with his family and continue his law practice. On December 26, 1837, he married Elizabeth Skinner, with whom he had five children. He died on April 16, 1876, aged 64, in St. Louis, from heart disease. He is buried in Bellefontaine Cemetery.

== See also ==
- List of United States senators expelled or censured

Party political offices
Preceded by Sterling Price	Democratic nominee for Governor of Missouri; 1856	Succeeded by Robert Marcellus Stewart
Political offices
Preceded by Sterling Price	Governor of Missouri; 1857	Succeeded by Hancock Jackson
U.S. Senate
Preceded by Henry S. Geyer	U.S. Senator (Class 1) from Missouri; 1857–1862; Served alongside: James S. Green, Waldo P. Johnson	Succeeded by John B. Henderson
