= 1860 Missouri gubernatorial election =

- August 6, 1860
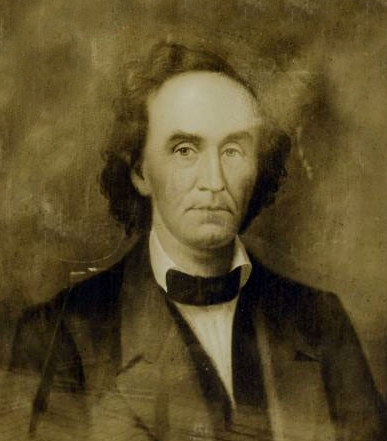

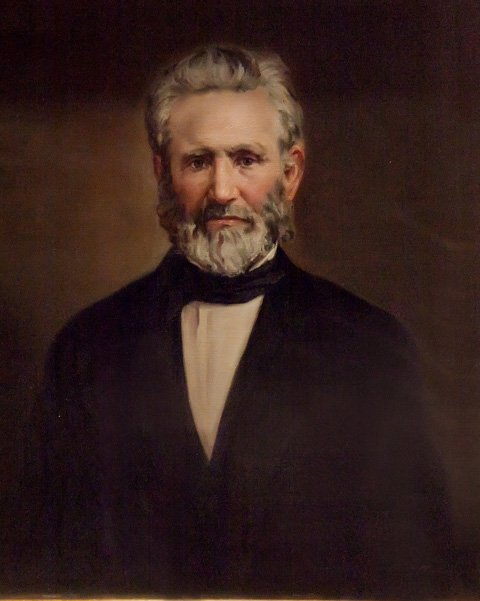
Nominee	Claiborne Fox Jackson	Sample Orr	Hancock Lee Jackson
Party	Democratic	Constitutional Union	Southern Democratic
Popular vote	74,446	66,583	11,415
Percentage	46.95%	41.99%	7.20%
- County results Fox Jackson: 30–40% 40–50% 50–60% 60–70% 70–80% 80–90% Orr: 30–40% 40–50% 50–60% 60–70% Lee Jackson: 40–50% 50–60% 60–70% 70–80%
Governor before election
Robert Marcellus Stewart
Democratic
Elected Governor
Claiborne Fox Jackson
Democratic

The 1860 Missouri gubernatorial election was held on August 6, 1860, and resulted in a victory for the Democratic nominee, Claiborne Fox Jackson. Jackson defeated the nominee of the Constitutional Union Party, Sample Orr, and Southern "Brekenridge" Democrat Former Gov. Hancock Lee Jackson to become the fifteenth governor of Missouri. Republican James B. Gardenhire also ran in the election, but received a negligible number of votes, despite Abraham Lincoln, a Republican, receiving 10% of the statewide vote in the presidential race.

Before the next election in 1864, three men would serve as Governor of Missouri: first, Claiborne Fox Jackson until his defection to the Confederacy in July 1861, then Hamilton Rowan Gamble until his death in January 1864, and finally Lt. Gov Willard Preble Hall.

== Results ==
1860 gubernatorial election, Missouri
Party	Candidate	Votes	%	±%
Democratic	Claiborne Fox Jackson	74,446	46.95	−3.23
Constitutional Union	Sample Orr	66,583	41.99	+41.99
Southern Democratic	Hancock Lee Jackson	11,415	7.20	+7.20
Republican	James B. Gardenhire	6,135	3.87	+3.87
Majority		7,863	4.96	+4.60
Turnout		158,579	13.42	
Democratic hold		Swing		

=== Results by County ===
1860 Missouri Gubernatorial Election (By County)
County	Claiborne Fox Jackson Democratic		Sample Orr Constitutional Union		Hancock Lee Jackson Southern Democratic		James B. Gardenhire Republican		Total
County	#	%	#	%	#	%	#	%	Total
Adair	822	61.80%	504	37.89%	4	0.30%	0	0.00%	1,330
Andrew	776	46.78%	574	34.60%	279	16.82%	30	1.81%	1,659
Atchison	450	55.35%	213	26.20%	120	14.76%	30	3.69%	813
Audrain	615	46.14%	671	50.34%	47	3.53%	0	0.00%	1,333
Barry	461	62.47%	240	32.52%	37	5.01%	0	0.00%	738
Barton	177	65.07%	52	19.12%	43	15.81%	0	0.00%	272
Bates	605	53.63%	224	19.86%	299	26.51%	0	0.00%	1,128
Benton	720	65.81%	344	31.44%	16	1.46%	14	1.28%	1,094
Bollinger	418	83.77%	57	11.42%	17	3.41%	7	1.40%	499
Boone	1,066	40.14%	1,522	57.30%	68	2.56%	0	0.00%	2,656
Buchanan	1,690	50.18%	1,280	38.00%	227	6.74%	171	5.08%	3,368
Butler	102	36.17%	152	53.90%	28	9.93%	0	0.00%	282
Caldwell	325	44.64%	364	50.00%	18	2.88%	21	2.47%	728
Callaway	1,080	43.27%	1,321	52.92%	94	3.77%	1	0.04%	2,496
Camden	260	47.88%	197	36.28%	82	15.10%	4	0.74%	543
Cape Girardeau	389	26.12%	697	46.81%	211	14.17%	192	12.89%	1,489
Carroll	938	61.23%	594	38.77%	0	0.00%	0	0.00%	1,532
Carter	40	31.01%	14	10.85%	75	58.14%	0	0.00%	129
Cass	471	30.02%	756	48.18%	334	21.29%	8	0.51%	1,569
Cedar	441	54.51%	243	30.04%	122	15.08%	3	0.37%	809
Chariton	639	48.45%	548	41.55%	124	9.40%	8	0.61%	1,319
Christian	322	41.87%	362	47.07%	85	11.05%	0	0.00%	769
Clark	807	46.04%	769	43.87%	74	4.22%	103	5.88%	1,753
Clay	586	37.49%	843	53.93%	134	8.57%	0	0.00%	1,563
Clinton	587	46.08%	636	49.92%	38	2.98%	13	1.02%	1,274
Cole	299	20.79%	734	51.04%	405	28.16%	0	0.00%	1,438
Cooper	1,076	49.68%	1,029	47.51%	54	2.49%	7	0.32%	2,166
Crawford	215	29.99%	458	63.88%	39	5.44%	5	0.70%	717
Dade	414	46.52%	398	44.72%	78	8.76%	0	0.00%	890
Dallas	291	43.56%	370	55.39%	6	0.90%	1	0.15%	668
Daviess	784	54.60%	572	39.83%	370	4.87%	10	0.70%	1,436
DeKalb	487	62.44%	264	33.85%	29	3.72%	0	0.00%	780
Dent	316	50.48%	174	27.80%	130	20.77%	6	0.96%	626
Douglas	182	42.72%	214	50.23%	30	7.04%	0	0.00%	426
Dunklin	100	49.50%	57	28.22%	45	22.28%	0	0.00%	202
Franklin	727	42.42%	654	38.16%	45	16.80%	288	2.63%	1,714
Gasconade	227	36.03%	276	43.81%	39	6.19%	88	13.97%	630
Gentry	1,212	72.36%	214	12.78%	88	5.25%	161	9.61%	1,675
Greene	502	25.39%	1,337	67.63%	137	6.93%	1	0.05%	1,977
Grundy	494	49.06%	476	47.27%	24	2.38%	13	1.29%	1,007
Harrison	792	67.46%	104	22.15%	18	8.86%	260	1.53%	1,174
Henry	771	49.87%	747	48.32%	27	1.75%	1	0.06%	1,546
Hickory	321	53.23%	263	43.62%	16	2.65%	3	0.50%	603
Holt	504	47.24%	258	24.18%	132	12.37%	173	16.21%	1,067
Howard	1,099	58.74%	743	39.71%	28	1.50%	1	0.05%	1,871
Howell	76	27.05%	190	67.62%	15	5.34%	0	0.00%	281
Iron	522	64.60%	212	26.24%	28	3.47%	46	5.69%	808
Jackson	1,693	52.04%	1,415	43.50%	105	3.23%	40	1.23%	3,253
Jasper	356	41.59%	422	49.30%	65	7.59%	13	1.52%	856
Jefferson	805	56.61%	528	37.13%	49	3.45%	40	2.81%	1,422
Johnson	900	40.36%	1,266	56.77%	61	2.74%	3	0.13%	2,230
Knox	844	61.12%	526	38.09%	3	0.22%	8	0.58%	1,381
Laclede	295	36.88%	367	45.88%	138	17.25%	0	0.00%	800
Lafayette	975	38.39%	1,538	60.55%	27	1.06%	0	0.00%	2,540
Lawrence	432	36.39%	638	53.75%	96	8.09%	21	1.77%	1,187
Lewis	1,018	51.75%	848	43.11%	101	5.13%	0	0.00%	1,967
Lincoln	885	48.12%	634	34.48%	307	16.69%	13	0.71%	1,839
Linn	796	53.42%	668	44.83%	7	0.47%	19	1.28%	1,490
Livingston	840	57.53%	583	39.93%	37	2.53%	0	0.00%	1,460
Macon	1,424	70.39%	484	23.92%	115	5.68%	0	0.00%	2,023
Madison	332	47.84%	331	47.69%	31	4.47%	0	0.00%	694
Maries	291	56.50%	44	8.54%	175	33.98%	5	0.97%	515
Marion	1,409	48.89%	1,322	45.87%	149	5.17%	2	0.07%	2,882
McDonald	336	70.15%	96	20.04%	47	9.81%	0	0.00%	479
Mercer	789	54.72%	613	42.51%	30	2.08%	10	0.69%	1,442
Miller	297	38.27%	267	34.41%	211	27.19%	1	0.13%	776
Mississippi	356	60.24%	210	35.53%	25	4.23%	0	0.00%	591
Moniteau	626	40.92%	867	56.67%	29	1.90%	8	0.52%	1,530
Monroe	998	45.89%	1,059	48.69%	117	5.38%	1	0.05%	2,175
Montgomery	597	46.03%	652	50.27%	14	1.08%	34	2.62%	1,297
Morgan	635	59.62%	366	34.37%	48	4.51%	16	1.50%	1,065
New Madrid	142	35.41%	157	39.15%	102	25.44%	0	0.00%	401
Newton	770	58.60%	480	36.53%	62	4.72%	2	0.15%	1,314
Nodaway	991	75.42%	201	15.30%	38	2.89%	84	6.39%	1,314
Oregon	101	45.29%	4	1.79%	118	52.91%	0	0.00%	223
Osage	418	42.26%	359	36.30%	142	14.36%	70	7.08%	989
Ozark	182	42.72%	214	50.23%	30	7.04%	0	0.00%	426
Pemiscot	229	65.62%	120	34.38%	0	0.00%	0	0.00%	349
Perry	615	75.18%	109	13.33%	32	3.91%	62	7.58%	818
Pettis	475	39.52%	699	58.15%	28	2.33%	0	0.00%	1,202
Phelps	415	51.94%	205	25.66%	168	21.03%	11	1.38%	799
Pike	1,548	51.79%	1,388	46.44%	50	1.67%	3	0.10%	2,989
Platte	1,056	43.44%	1,005	41.34%	368	15.14%	2	0.08%	2,431
Polk	163	11.07%	811	55.06%	498	33.81%	1	0.07%	1,473
Pulaski	297	86.34%	5	1.45%	37	10.76%	5	1.45%	344
Putnam	728	60.47%	350	29.07%	118	9.80%	8	0.66%	1,204
Ralls	616	48.39%	647	50.82%	9	0.71%	1	0.08%	1,273
Randolph	828	44.44%	852	45.73%	183	9.82%	0	0.00%	1,863
Ray	994	54.89%	791	43.68%	25	1.38%	1	0.06%	1,811
Reynolds	298	84.90%	27	7.69%	26	7.41%	0	0.00%	351
Ripley	121	26.89%	26	5.78%	303	67.33%	0	0.00%	450
Saline	933	47.75%	1,002	51.28%	19	0.97%	0	0.00%	1,954
Schuyler	500	54.00%	298	32.18%	124	13.39%	4	0.43%	926
Scotland	792	56.09%	493	34.92%	19	1.35%	108	7.65%	1,412
Scott	230	27.88%	313	37.94%	282	34.18%	0	0.00%	825
Shannon	11	4.45%	44	17.81%	181	73.28%	11	4.45%	247
Shelby	621	48.03%	576	44.55%	95	7.35%	1	0.08%	1,293
St. Charles	829	38.94%	774	36.36%	60	2.82%	466	21.89%	2,129
St. Clair	395	53.38%	203	27.43%	142	19.19%	0	0.00%	740
St. Francois	647	58.45%	416	37.58%	44	3.97%	0	0.00%	1,107
St. Louis	9,764	38.06%	12,457	48.56%	219	0.85%	3,215	12.53%	25,655
Ste. Genevieve	556	72.87%	163	21.36%	14	3.93%	30	1.83%	763
Stoddard	318	43.15%	407	55.22%	12	1.63%	0	0.00%	737
Sullivan	678	52.48%	326	25.23%	259	20.05%	29	2.24%	1,292
Taney	209	54.86%	88	23.10%	84	22.05%	0	0.00%	381
Texas	259	33.08%	132	16.86%	392	50.06%	0	0.00%	783
Vernon	305	43.95%	127	18.30%	261	37.61%	1	0.14%	694
Warren	630	65.15%	287	29.68%	32	3.31%	18	1.86%	967
Washington	680	55.46%	519	42.33%	26	2.12%	1	0.08%	1,226
Wayne	313	45.76%	166	24.27%	200	29.24%	5	0.73%	684
Webster	243	24.08%	582	57.68%	183	18.14%	1	0.10%	1,009
Wright	139	24.87%	160	28.62%	260	46.51%	0	0.00%	559
Totals	74,446	46.95%	66,583	41.99%	11,415	7.20%	6,135	3.87%	158,579
