= Charles Phillip Johnson =

American politician and attorney

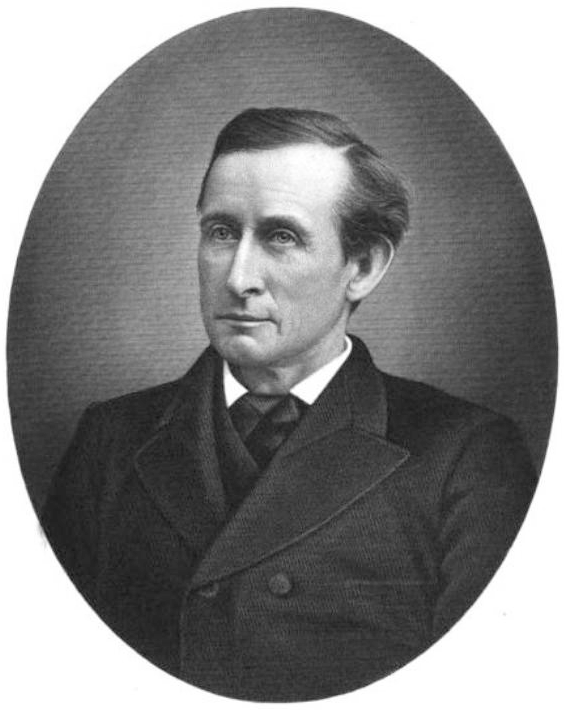

Lieutenant Governor of Missouri
- In office 1873–1875

Personal details
- Born: January 18, 1836; Lebanon, Illinois
- Died: May 21, 1920 (aged 84); St. Louis, Missouri
- Resting place: Bellefontaine Cemetery
- Occupation: Politician, lawyer

Charles Phillip Johnson (January 18, 1836 - May 21, 1920) was an American politician and attorney who served as Missouri lieutenant governor from 1873 until 1875.

== Biography ==
Johnson was born in Lebanon, Illinois on January 18, 1836. His maternal grandparents were from Virginia. His mother was born in Mississippi River island community of Kaskaskia, Illinois. His father was born in Philadelphia. He briefly attended McKendree College.

Johnson had been a newspaper editor for two years before he took up the study of law. Four years later he became city attorney in St. Louis. Johnson had helped organize Missouri troops for the Union cause during the Civil War. He served in the Missouri legislature before and after his term as lieutenant governor. In the 1880s, when the James–Younger Gang was breaking up, the strong Union-supporter Johnson was one of the defense attorneys for Frank James. Johnson taught law at the School of Law at the Washington University for many years.

He died at his son's home in St. Louis on May 21, 1920. He was buried at Bellefontaine Cemetery.

Party political offices
| Preceded by Joseph J. Gravely | Liberal Republican nominee for Lieutenant Governor of Missouri; 1872 | Succeeded by None |
Political offices
| Preceded by Vacant | Lieutenant Governor of Missouri; 1873–1875 | Succeeded by Norman Jay Coleman |
