= Norman Jay Colman =

American politician (1827–1911)

Norman Colman
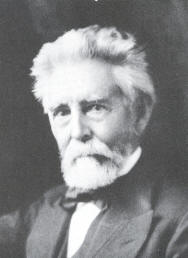

1st United States Secretary of Agriculture
- In office February 15, 1889 – March 6, 1889
- President: Grover Cleveland; Benjamin Harrison
- Preceded by: Himself as Commissioner of Agriculture
- Succeeded by: Jeremiah Rusk

6th United States Commissioner of Agriculture
- In office April 3, 1885 – February 15, 1889
- President: Grover Cleveland
- Preceded by: George B. Loring
- Succeeded by: Himself as Secretary of Agriculture

17th Lieutenant Governor of Missouri
- In office January 12, 1875 – January 8, 1877
- Governor: Charles Henry Hardin
- Preceded by: Charles Phillip Johnson
- Succeeded by: Henry Clay Brockmeyer

St. Louis City Council Alderman for the 5th ward
- In office 1854–1855

Personal details
- Born: Norman Jay Colman; May 16, 1827 Richfield Springs, New York, U.S.
- Died: November 3, 1911 (aged 84) St. Louis, Missouri, U.S.
- Resting place: Bellefontaine Cemetery
- Party: Democratic
- Spouse(s): Clara Porter; Catherine Wright
- Education: University of Louisville (LLB)

Norman Jay Colman (May 16, 1827 – November 3, 1911) was an American politician, attorney, educator, newspaper publisher, and, for 18 days, the first United States secretary of agriculture.

== Louisville, Kentucky ==
Colman was born in Richfield Springs, New York, to son of Nancy (Sprague) and Hamilton Coleman. He later moved to Kentucky to become an educator. While in Louisville, he took the time to attend law school and received a law degree from the University of Louisville Law School in 1849.

== Greenville, Indiana ==
In 1850, Colman became the first principal in Greenville when the Floyd County Seminary opened in Greenville, Indiana. The school was funded by raising $2,000 with Greenville residents contributing an additional $800 to secure the school for their town. For this sum, it was possible to erect a large 2-story brick building on land donated by Isaac Redman. One of the trustees appointed to oversee the new school was John Baptiste Ford of Greenville who was a prominent resident and famous for his glass works.

Colman served as Principal in Greenville for two years. In 1852, the Hoosier legislature approved the first laws establishing the public school system. This spelled the end of the older county seminaries for the new law provided that they be closed and their assets turned over to the new public school systems. Some 100 students had been attending the school paying tuition of $4 to $8 a semester and finding board and lodging in Greenville homes at $1 a week.

The closing of the Seminary proved to be the end of Colman's teaching career. During Colman's time in Greenville, he met Clara Porter and married in 1851. Clara was the daughter of Daniel Porter who is best known for Porter's Public House in Greenville which was a notorious hotel, bar, and social spot. Together they had two children; Laura Kate Colman (1860) and Francis Porter Colman (1862).

== Missouri ==
Colman then moved to Missouri, ostensibly to farm. He was elected as an Alderman for St. Louis city's 5th ward as a Whig in 1854 and 1855 In 1855 he founded the Valley Farmer newspaper. As a result of his publication, Colman became a prominent figure in Missouri farming circles, which set the path for a political career in the Missouri House of Representatives. The publication of Colman's newspaper was interrupted by the American Civil War, but three years after the war he founded the Colman's Rural World. His political career continued, culminating with his election as the 17th Lieutenant Governor of Missouri from 1875 to 1877, as a Democrat.

== Commissioner of Agriculture ==
President Grover Cleveland appointed Colman Commissioner of Agriculture in 1885. During his tenure he led a coalition of land-grant agricultural colleges in writing proposed legislation for the creation of agricultural experiment stations. Their lobbying efforts helped produce the Hatch Act in 1887.

== First Secretary of Agriculture ==
He also lobbied for the creation of the United States Department of Agriculture and served as its inaugural Secretary at the end of Cleveland's term, February 15, 1889, to March 6, 1889. However, his position was never confirmed by the United States Senate.

== Retirement ==
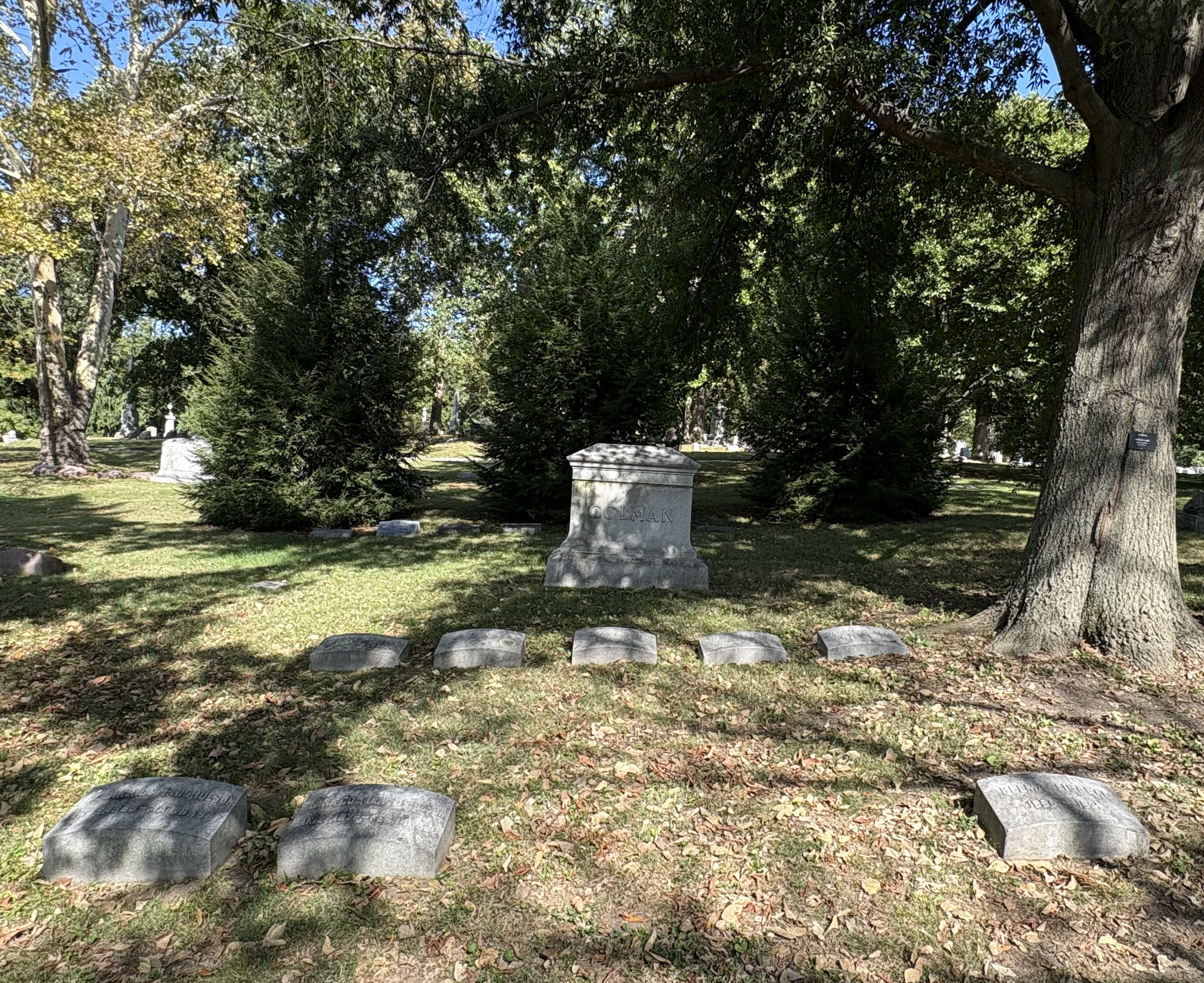
Colman's grave (back row, third from left) at Bellefontaine Cemetery

He returned to St. Louis to run his newspaper. He also spent the next 20 years in state public service and in horse-breeding.

Colman died on the morning of November 3, 1911, at age 84, on a train heading to St. Louis. He had suffered a stroke in a sleeping car berth the day prior and was unconscious for nearly 24 hours before he succumbed. He is buried in Bellefontaine Cemetery in St. Louis.

== Personal life ==
Colman married Clara Porter of Greenville, Indiana in 1851 and had two children, daughter Laura Kate Colman (1860), who was the second wife of John Fremont Hill, Governor of Maine and Francis Porter Colman (1862) After Clara's death he married his second wife, the former Catherine Wright in 1866 and had one child, daughter Clara Wright Colman (1876) whom he named after his deceased wife.

He was a member of the Freemasons.

Party political offices
Preceded by Luke Burris	Democratic nominee for Lieutenant Governor of Missouri; 1868, 1874	Succeeded by Henry Clay Brockmeyer
Political offices
Preceded by Charles Johnson	Lieutenant Governor of Missouri; 1875–1877	Succeeded by Henry Brockmeyer
Preceded by George B. Loring	United States Secretary of Agriculture; 1885–1889	Succeeded by Jeremiah Rusk
