= Wilson Brown (politician) =

American politician (1804–1855)

Lieutenant Governor of Missouri
- In office 1853–1855
- Governor: Sterling Price
- Preceded by: Thomas Lawson Price
- Succeeded by: Hancock Lee Jackson

Personal details
- Born: August 27, 1804 Anne Arundel County, Maryland, U.S.
- Died: August 27, 1855 (aged 51) Cape Girardeau, Missouri, U.S.
- Party: Democratic
- Occupation: Doctor and Postmaster

Wilson Brown (August 27, 1804 – August 27, 1855) was an American politician. He was the Lieutenant Governor of Missouri from 1853 until his death in office in 1855. He also served in the Missouri House of Representatives from 1838 to 1839.
