= 1852 Missouri gubernatorial election =

- August 2, 1852
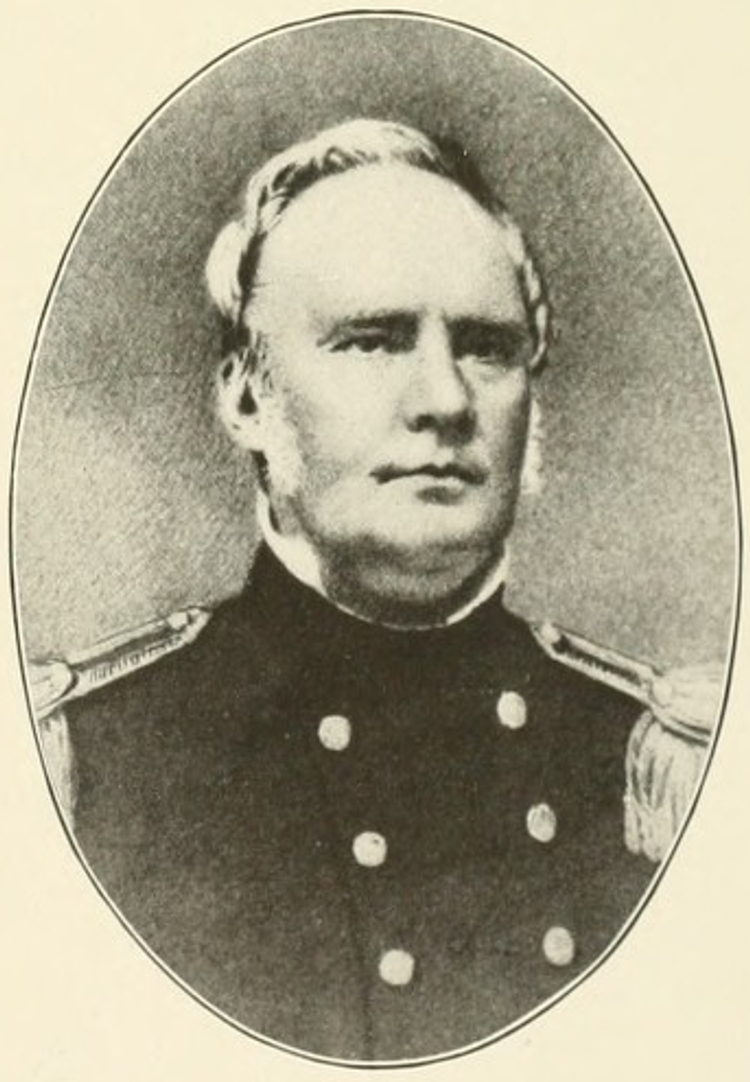

Nominee	Sterling Price	James Winston
Party	Democratic	Whig
Popular vote	46,494	32,686
Percentage	58.72%	41.28%
- County results Price: 50–60% 60–70% 70–80% 80–90% 90–100% Winston: 50–60% 60–70% No Data/Vote
Governor before election
Austin Augustus King
Democratic
Elected Governor
Sterling Price
Democratic

The 1852 Missouri gubernatorial election was held on August 2, 1852, the Democratic nominee, Sterling Price, defeated Whig candidate James Winston.

== General election ==
=== Candidates ===
- Sterling Price, former U.S. Representative from Keytesville (representing Missouri at-large) (Democratic)
- James Winston (Whig)

=== Results ===
1852 gubernatorial election, Missouri
Party	Candidate	Votes	%	±%
Democratic	Sterling Price	46,494	58.72	−0.30
Whig	James Winston	32,686	41.28	+0.30
Majority		13,808	17.44	−0.60
Turnout		79,180	11.61	
Democratic hold		Swing		
