= Hancock Lee Jackson =

American politician (1796–1876)

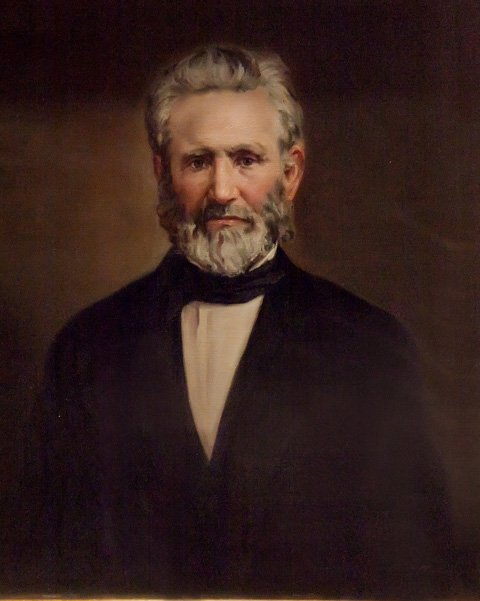

13th Governor of Missouri
- In office February 27, 1857 – October 22, 1857
- Lieutenant: Vacant
- Preceded by: Trusten Polk
- Succeeded by: Robert Marcellus Stewart

10th Lieutenant Governor of Missouri
- In office January 5, 1857 – February 27, 1857
- Governor: Trusten Polk
- Preceded by: Wilson Brown
- Succeeded by: Vacant
- In office October 22, 1857 – January 3, 1861
- Governor: Robert Marcellus Stewart
- Preceded by: Vacant
- Succeeded by: Thomas Caute Reynolds

Member of the Missouri Senate
- In office 1851–1855

Personal details
- Born: May 12, 1796 Madison County, Kentucky, U.S.
- Died: March 19, 1876 (aged 79) Salem, Oregon, US
- Resting place: Salem Pioneer Cemetery
- Party: Democratic
- Children: 11
- Profession: Farmer, politician

Hancock Lee Jackson (May 12, 1796 – March 19, 1876) was an American politician. A member of the Democratic Party, he served as the 13th governor of Missouri in 1857, and as the tenth lieutenant governor of Missouri in 1857, and from 1857 to 1861.

== Biography ==
Jackson was born on May 12, 1796, in Madison County, Kentucky, to John Jackson and Mary Forrest (née Hancock) Jackson. He was part of a large political family, with The Political Graveyard naming him a member of the "Breathitt-Sappington-Jackson family" of Kentucky and Missouri.

Jackson was educated at public schools in Madison County. On March 8, 1821, he married Ursula Oldham; they had eleven children together. Jackson and his wife moved to Missouri in 1821, living in Howard County until 1822, moving to then-unincorporated Randolph County. A Democrat, he served two terms as sheriff of Randolph County, beginning in 1829. He was a delegate to the 1845 Missouri Constitutional Convention. During the Mexican–American War, he served as a captain of the 2nd Regiment of Missouri Mounted Volunteers.

After the war, Jackson returned to Missouri and was a member of the Missouri Senate from 1851 to 1855. He was Lieutenant Governor of Missouri from January 5 to February 27, 1857, under Trusten Polk. Following Polk's resignation as Governor to join the United States Senate, Jackson assume the position and served from February 27 to October 22, 1857. He was succeeded by Robert Marcellus Stewart, who he served as Lieutenant Governor under, from October 22, 1857, to January 3, 1861. He ran for Governor in 1860, losing to Claiborne Fox Jackson. Politically, he supported states' rights and the Confederate States of America in their secession.

After serving as Lieutenant Governor, Jackson was a member of the United States Marshals Service and headed the Western District of Missouri, from 1860 to until his resignation in 1861, following the election of President Abraham Lincoln. Afterward, he lived in Salem, Oregon. He died on March 19, 1876, aged 79, in Salem, and is buried in the Salem Pioneer Cemetery.

Party political offices
| Preceded by None | Southern Democratic nominee for Governor of Missouri; 1860 | Succeeded by None |
Political offices
| Preceded by Wilson Brown | Lieutenant Governor of Missouri; 1857–1861 | Succeeded by Thomas Caute Reynolds |
| Preceded by Trusten Polk | Governor of Missouri; February 27, 1857 – October 22, 1857 | Succeeded by Robert M. Stewart |
