= 1874 Missouri gubernatorial election =

- November 3, 1874
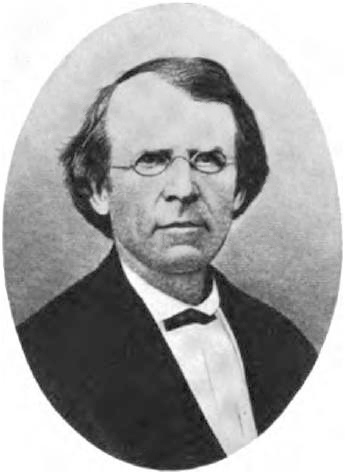

Nominee	Charles Henry Hardin	William Gentry
Party	Democratic	Republican
Popular vote	149,566	112,104
Percentage	57.16%	42.84%
- County results Hardin: 50–60% 60–70% 70–80% 80–90% 90–100% Gentry: 50–60% 60–70% 70–80% 80–90% 90–100%
Governor before election
Silas Woodson
Democratic
Elected Governor
Charles Henry Hardin
Democratic

The 1874 Missouri gubernatorial election was held on November 3, 1874, and resulted in a victory for the Democratic nominee, Charles Henry Hardin, over the Republican candidate, William Gentry.

== Results ==
1874 gubernatorial election, Missouri
Party	Candidate	Votes	%	±%
Democratic	Charles Henry Hardin	149,566	57.16	+0.90
Republican	William Gentry	121,889	42.84	−0.90
Majority		37,462	14.32	+1.80
Turnout		261,670	15.20	
Democratic hold		Swing		
