= Missouri's congressional delegations =

Missouri's congressional districts since 2023

These are tables of congressional delegations from Missouri to the United States House of Representatives and the United States Senate.

The current dean of the Missouri delegation is Representative Sam Graves (R), having served in Congress since 2001.

== U.S. House of Representatives ==
=== Current members ===
List of members, their terms in office, district boundaries, and the district political ratings according to the CPVI. The delegation has 8 members: 6 Republicans and 2 Democrats.

Current U.S. representatives from Missouri
District	Member (Residence)	Party	Incumbent since	CPVI (2026)	District map
1st	Wesley Bell (Clayton)	Democratic	January 3, 2025	D+29	
2nd	Ann Wagner (Ballwin)	Republican	January 3, 2013	R+4	
3rd	Bob Onder (Lake St. Louis)	Republican	January 3, 2025	R+13	
4th	Mark Alford (Lake Winnebago)	Republican	January 3, 2023	R+21	
5th	Emanuel Cleaver (Kansas City)	Democratic	January 3, 2005	D+12	
6th	Sam Graves (Tarkio)	Republican	January 3, 2001	R+19	
7th	Eric Burlison (Ozark)	Republican	January 3, 2023	R+21	
8th	Jason Smith (Salem)	Republican	June 4, 2013	R+27	

=== Delegates from Missouri Territory ===
On June 4, 1812, the Missouri Territory was created following the creation of the state of Louisiana. The Arkansas Territory was spun off in 1819. The state of Missouri was separated in 1821 and the remaining land was annexed by the Michigan Territory in 1834.

Delegate	Years	Party
Edward Hempstead	November 9, 1812 – September 17, 1814	none
Rufus Easton	September 17, 1814 – August 5, 1816	none
John Scott	August 6, 1816 – January 13, 1817	none
John Scott	August 4, 1817 – March 3, 1821	none

=== After statehood ===
==== 1821–1853 ====
Congress	Elected at-large on a general ticket				
Congress	1st seat	2nd seat	3rd seat	4th seat	5th seat
17th (1821–1823)	John Scott (DR) (Note: Supported the Adams-Clay faction in the 1824 United States presidential election.)	2nd seat	3rd seat	4th seat	5th seat
18th (1823–1825)	John Scott (DR)	2nd seat	3rd seat	4th seat	5th seat
19th (1825–1827)	John Scott (NR)	2nd seat	3rd seat	4th seat	5th seat
20th (1827–1829)	Edward Bates (NR)	2nd seat	3rd seat	4th seat	5th seat
21st (1829–1831)	Spencer Pettis (J)	2nd seat	3rd seat	4th seat	5th seat
22nd (1831–1833)	William H. Ashley (J)	2nd seat	3rd seat	4th seat	5th seat
23rd (1833–1835)	William H. Ashley (J)	John Bull (NR)	3rd seat	4th seat	5th seat
24th (1835–1837)	William H. Ashley (J)	Albert Galliton Harrison (J)	3rd seat	4th seat	5th seat
25th (1837–1839)	John Miller (D)	Albert Galliton Harrison (D)	3rd seat	4th seat	5th seat
26th (1839–1841)	John Miller (D)	John Jameson (D)	3rd seat	4th seat	5th seat
27th (1841–1843)	John Miller (D)	John C. Edwards (D)	3rd seat	4th seat	5th seat
28th (1843–1845)	James B. Bowlin (D)	John Jameson (D)	James H. Relfe (D)	Gustavus Miller Bower (D)	James Madison Hughes (D)
29th (1845–1847)	James B. Bowlin (D)	Sterling Price (D)	James H. Relfe (D)	Leonard H. Sims (D)	John S. Phelps (D)
29th (1845–1847)	James B. Bowlin (D)	William McDaniel (D)	James H. Relfe (D)	Leonard H. Sims (D)	John S. Phelps (D)
Congress	1st district	2nd district	3rd district	4th district	5th district
30th (1847–1849)	James B. Bowlin (D)	John Jameson (D)	James S. Green (D)	Willard P. Hall (D)	John S. Phelps (D)
31st (1849–1851)	James B. Bowlin (D)	William Van Ness Bay (D)	James S. Green (D)	Willard P. Hall (D)	John S. Phelps (D)
32nd (1851–1853)	John Fletcher Darby (W)	Gilchrist Porter (W)	John Gaines Miller (W)	Willard P. Hall (D)	John S. Phelps (D)

==== 1853–1863 ====
Congress	1st district	2nd district	3rd district	4th district	5th district	6th district	7th district
33rd (1853–1855)	Thomas Hart Benton (D)	Alfred W. Lamb (D)	James Johnson; Lindley (W)	Mordecai Oliver (W)	John Gaines Miller (W)	John S. Phelps (D)	Samuel Caruthers (W)
34th (1855–1857)	Luther Martin Kennett (W)	Gilchrist Porter (W)	James Johnson; Lindley (W)	Mordecai Oliver (W)	John Gaines Miller (W)	John S. Phelps (D)	Samuel Caruthers (W)
34th (1855–1857)	Luther Martin Kennett (W)	Gilchrist Porter (W)	James Johnson; Lindley (W)	Mordecai Oliver (W)	Thomas P. Akers (KN)	John S. Phelps (D)	Samuel Caruthers (W)
35th (1857–1859)	Francis P. Blair (R)	Thomas L. Anderson (KN)	John Bullock Clark (D)	James Craig (D)	Samuel H. Woodson (KN)	John S. Phelps (D)	Samuel Caruthers (W)
36th (1859–1861)	John R. Barret (D)	Thomas L. Anderson (ID)	John Bullock Clark (D)	James Craig (D)	Samuel H. Woodson (KN)	John S. Phelps (D)	John W. Noell (D)
36th (1859–1861)	Francis P. Blair (R)	Thomas L. Anderson (ID)	John Bullock Clark (D)	James Craig (D)	Samuel H. Woodson (KN)	John S. Phelps (D)	John W. Noell (D)
36th (1859–1861)	John R. Barret (D)	Thomas L. Anderson (ID)	John Bullock Clark (D)	James Craig (D)	Samuel H. Woodson (KN)	John S. Phelps (D)	John W. Noell (D)
37th (1861–1863)	Francis P. Blair (R)	James S. Rollins (CU)	John Bullock Clark (D)	Elijah Hise; Norton (D)	John William Reid (D)	John S. Phelps (D)	John W. Noell (D)
37th (1861–1863)	Francis P. Blair (R)	James S. Rollins (CU)	William A. Hall (D)	Elijah Hise; Norton (D)	Thomas L. Price (D)	John S. Phelps (D)	John W. Noell (D)

==== 1863–1873 ====
Congress	District								
Congress	1st	2nd	3rd	4th	5th	6th	7th	8th	9th
38th (1863–1865)	Francis P. Blair Jr. (GE)	Henry Taylor Blow (IE)	John W. Noell (E)	Sempronius H. Boyd (IE)	Joseph W. McClurg (IE)	Austin A. King (D)	Benjamin F. Loan (IE)	William A. Hall (D)	James S. Rollins (CU)
38th (1863–1865)	Samuel Knox (IE)	Henry Taylor Blow (IE)	John G. Scott (D)	Sempronius H. Boyd (IE)	Joseph W. McClurg (IE)	Austin A. King (D)	Benjamin F. Loan (IE)	William A. Hall (D)	James S. Rollins (CU)
39th (1865–1867) (Note: In elections from 1864 to 1870, the Missouri Republican Party ran candidates on the Radical Union Party ticket.)	John Hogan (D)	Henry Taylor Blow (RU)	Thomas E. Noell (RU)	John R. Kelso (IU)	Joseph W. McClurg (RU)	Robert T. Van Horn (RU)	Benjamin F. Loan (RU)	John F. Benjamin (RU)	George Washington; Anderson (RU)
40th (1867–1869)	William A. Pile (RU)	Carman Newcomb (RU)	Thomas E. Noell (CU)	Joseph J. Gravely (RU)	Joseph W. McClurg (RU)	Robert T. Van Horn (RU)	Benjamin F. Loan (RU)	John F. Benjamin (RU)	George Washington; Anderson (RU)
40th (1867–1869)	William A. Pile (RU)	Carman Newcomb (RU)	James R. McCormick (D)	Joseph J. Gravely (RU)	John H. Stover (RU)	Robert T. Van Horn (RU)	Benjamin F. Loan (RU)	John F. Benjamin (RU)	George Washington; Anderson (RU)
41st (1869–1871)	Erastus Wells (D)	Gustavus; Finkelnburg (RU)	James R. McCormick (D)	Sempronius H. Boyd (RU)	Samuel Swinfin; Burdett (RU)	Robert T. Van Horn (RU)	Joel Funk Asper (RU)	John F. Benjamin (RU)	David P. Dyer (RU)
42nd (1871–1873)	Erastus Wells (D)	Gustavus; Finkelnburg (LR)	James R. McCormick (D)	Harrison E. Havens (RU)	Samuel Swinfin; Burdett (RU)	Abram Comingo (D)	Isaac C. Parker (RU)	James G. Blair (LR)	Andrew King (D)

==== 1873–1883 ====
Congress	District												
Congress	1st	2nd	3rd	4th	5th	6th	7th	8th	9th	10th	11th	12th	13th
43rd (1873–1875)	Edwin O. Stanard (R)	Erastus Wells (D)	William Henry; Stone (D)	Robert A. Hatcher (D)	Richard P. Bland (D)	Harrison E. Havens (R)	Thomas Theodore; Crittenden (D)	Abram Comingo (D)	Isaac C. Parker (R)	Ira B. Hyde (R)	John Bullock; Clark Jr. (D)	John; Montgomery; Glover (D)	Aylett H. Buckner (D)
44th (1875–1877)	Edward C. Kehr (D)	Erastus Wells (D)	William Henry; Stone (D)	Robert A. Hatcher (D)	Richard P. Bland (D)	Charles H. Morgan (D)	John Finis; Philips (D)	Benjamin J. Franklin (D)	David Rhea (D)	Rezin A. De Bolt (D)	John Bullock; Clark Jr. (D)	John; Montgomery; Glover (D)	Aylett H. Buckner (D)
45th (1877–1879)	Anthony F. Ittner (R)	Nathan Cole (R)	Lyne Metcalfe (R)	Robert A. Hatcher (D)	Richard P. Bland (D)	Charles H. Morgan (D)	Thomas Theodore; Crittenden (D)	Benjamin J. Franklin (D)	David Rhea (D)	Henry M. Pollard (R)	John Bullock; Clark Jr. (D)	John; Montgomery; Glover (D)	Aylett H. Buckner (D)
46th (1879–1881)	Martin L. Clardy (D)	Erastus Wells (D)	R. Graham; Frost (D)	Lowndes H. David (D)	Richard P. Bland (D)	James R. Waddill (D)	Alfred M. Lay (D)	Samuel L. Sawyer (ID)	Nicholas; Ford (GB)	Gideon F. Rothwell (D)	John Bullock; Clark Jr. (D)	William H. Hatch (D)	Aylett H. Buckner (D)
46th (1879–1881)	Martin L. Clardy (D)	Erastus Wells (D)	R. Graham; Frost (D)	Lowndes H. David (D)	Richard P. Bland (D)	James R. Waddill (D)	John Finis Philips (D)	Samuel L. Sawyer (ID)	Nicholas; Ford (GB)	Gideon F. Rothwell (D)	John Bullock; Clark Jr. (D)	William H. Hatch (D)	Aylett H. Buckner (D)
47th (1881–1883)	Martin L. Clardy (D)	Thomas Allen (D)	R. Graham; Frost (D)	Lowndes H. David (D)	Richard P. Bland (D)	Ira S. Haseltine (GB)	Theron M. Rice (GB)	Robert T. Van Horn (R)	Nicholas; Ford (GB)	Joseph H. Burrows (GB)	John Bullock; Clark Jr. (D)	William H. Hatch (D)	Aylett H. Buckner (D)
47th (1881–1883)	Martin L. Clardy (D)	James Henry McLean (R)	Gustavus Sessinghaus (R)	Lowndes H. David (D)	Richard P. Bland (D)	Ira S. Haseltine (GB)	Theron M. Rice (GB)	Robert T. Van Horn (R)	Nicholas; Ford (GB)	Joseph H. Burrows (GB)	John Bullock; Clark Jr. (D)	William H. Hatch (D)	Aylett H. Buckner (D)

==== 1883–1933 ====
Congress	District															
Congress	1st	2nd	3rd	4th	5th	6th	7th	8th	9th	10th	11th	12th	13th	14th	15th	16th
48th (1883–1885)	William H. Hatch (D)	Armstead M. Alexander (D)	Alexander M. Dockery (D)	James N. Burnes (D)	Alexander Graves (D)	John Cosgrove (D)	Aylett H. Buckner (D)	John J. O'Neill (D)	James Broadhead (D)	Martin L. Clardy (D)	Richard P. Bland (D)	Charles H. Morgan (D)	Robert W. Fyan (D)	Lowndes H. Davis (D)		
49th (1885–1887)	William H. Hatch (D)	John B. Hale (D)	Alexander M. Dockery (D)	James N. Burnes (D)	William Warner (R)	John T. Heard (D)	John E. Hutton (D)	John J. O'Neill (D)	John Milton Glover (D)	Martin L. Clardy (D)	Richard P. Bland (D)	William J. Stone (D)	William H. Wade (R)	William Dawson (D)		
50th (1887–1889)	William H. Hatch (D)	Charles H. Mansur (D)	Alexander M. Dockery (D)	James N. Burnes (D)	William Warner (R)	John T. Heard (D)	John E. Hutton (D)	John J. O'Neill (D)	John Milton Glover (D)	Martin L. Clardy (D)	Richard P. Bland (D)	William J. Stone (D)	William H. Wade (R)	James P. Walker (D)		
50th (1887–1889)	William H. Hatch (D)	Charles H. Mansur (D)	Alexander M. Dockery (D)	Charles F. Booher (D)	William Warner (R)	John T. Heard (D)	John E. Hutton (D)	John J. O'Neill (D)	John Milton Glover (D)	Martin L. Clardy (D)	Richard P. Bland (D)	William J. Stone (D)	William H. Wade (R)	James P. Walker (D)		
51st (1889–1891)	William H. Hatch (D)	Charles H. Mansur (D)	Alexander M. Dockery (D)	Robert P. C. Wilson (D)	John C. Tarsney (D)	John T. Heard (D)	Richard H. Norton (D)	Frederick G. Niedringhaus (R)	Nathan Frank (R)	William M. Kinsey (R)	Richard P. Bland (D)	William J. Stone (D)	William H. Wade (R)	James P. Walker (D)		
51st (1889–1891)	William H. Hatch (D)	Charles H. Mansur (D)	Alexander M. Dockery (D)	Robert P. C. Wilson (D)	John C. Tarsney (D)	John T. Heard (D)	Richard H. Norton (D)	Frederick G. Niedringhaus (R)	Nathan Frank (R)	William M. Kinsey (R)	Richard P. Bland (D)	William J. Stone (D)	William H. Wade (R)	Robert H. Whitelaw (D)		
52nd (1891–1893)	William H. Hatch (D)	Charles H. Mansur (D)	Alexander M. Dockery (D)	Robert P. C. Wilson (D)	John C. Tarsney (D)	John T. Heard (D)	Richard H. Norton (D)	John J. O'Neill (D)	Seth W. Cobb (D)	Samuel Byrns (D)	Richard P. Bland (D)	David A. De Armond (D)	Robert W. Fyan (D)	Marshall Arnold (D)		
53rd (1893–1895)	William H. Hatch (D)	Uriel S. Hall (D)	Alexander M. Dockery (D)	Daniel D. Burnes (D)	John C. Tarsney (D)	David A. De Armond (D)	John T. Heard (D)	Richard P. Bland (D)	Champ Clark (D)	Richard Bartholdt (R)	Charles F. Joy (R)	Seth W. Cobb (D)	Robert W. Fyan (D)	Marshall Arnold (D)	Charles H. Morgan (D)	
53rd (1893–1895)	William H. Hatch (D)	Uriel S. Hall (D)	Alexander M. Dockery (D)	Daniel D. Burnes (D)	John C. Tarsney (D)	David A. De Armond (D)	John T. Heard (D)	Richard P. Bland (D)	Champ Clark (D)	Richard Bartholdt (R)	John J. O'Neill (D)	Seth W. Cobb (D)	Robert W. Fyan (D)	Marshall Arnold (D)	Charles H. Morgan (D)	
54th (1895–1897)	Charles N. Clark (R)	Uriel S. Hall (D)	Alexander M. Dockery (D)	George C. Crowther (R)	John C. Tarsney (D)	David A. De Armond (D)	John P. Tracey (R)	Joel D. Hubbard (R)	William M. Treloar (R)	Richard Bartholdt (R)	Charles F. Joy (R)	Seth W. Cobb (D)	John H. Raney (R) (Note: Might have represented the 15th district.)	Norman A. Mozley (R)	Charles G. Burton (R) (Note: Might have represented the 13th district.)	
54th (1895–1897)	Charles N. Clark (R)	Uriel S. Hall (D)	Alexander M. Dockery (D)	George C. Crowther (R)	Robert T. Van Horn (R)	David A. De Armond (D)	John P. Tracey (R)	Joel D. Hubbard (R)	William M. Treloar (R)	Richard Bartholdt (R)	Charles F. Joy (R)	Seth W. Cobb (D)	John H. Raney (R)	Norman A. Mozley (R)	Charles G. Burton (R)	
55th (1897–1899)	James T. Lloyd (D)	Robert N. Bodine (D)	Alexander M. Dockery (D)	Charles F. Cochran (D)	William S. Cowherd (D)	David A. De Armond (D)	James Cooney (D)	Richard P. Bland (D)	Champ Clark (D)	Richard Bartholdt (R)	Charles F. Joy (R)	Charles E. Pearce (R)	Edward Robb (D)	Willard Duncan Vandiver (D)	Maecenas E. Benton (D)	
56th (1899–1901)	James T. Lloyd (D)	William W. Rucker (D)	John Dougherty (D)	Charles F. Cochran (D)	William S. Cowherd (D)	David A. De Armond (D)	James Cooney (D)	Richard P. Bland (D)	Champ Clark (D)	Richard Bartholdt (R)	Charles F. Joy (R)	Charles E. Pearce (R)	Edward Robb (D)	Willard Duncan Vandiver (D)	Maecenas E. Benton (D)	
56th (1899–1901)	James T. Lloyd (D)	William W. Rucker (D)	John Dougherty (D)	Charles F. Cochran (D)	William S. Cowherd (D)	David A. De Armond (D)	James Cooney (D)	Dorsey W. Shackleford (D)	Champ Clark (D)	Richard Bartholdt (R)	Charles F. Joy (R)	Charles E. Pearce (R)	Edward Robb (D)	Willard Duncan Vandiver (D)	Maecenas E. Benton (D)	
57th (1901–1903)	James T. Lloyd (D)	William W. Rucker (D)	John Dougherty (D)	Charles F. Cochran (D)	William S. Cowherd (D)	David A. De Armond (D)	James Cooney (D)	Dorsey W. Shackleford (D)	Champ Clark (D)	Richard Bartholdt (R)	Charles F. Joy (R)	James Joseph Butler (D)	Edward Robb (D)	Willard Duncan Vandiver (D)	Maecenas E. Benton (D)	
57th (1901–1903)	James T. Lloyd (D)	William W. Rucker (D)	John Dougherty (D)	Charles F. Cochran (D)	William S. Cowherd (D)	David A. De Armond (D)	James Cooney (D)	Dorsey W. Shackleford (D)	Champ Clark (D)	Richard Bartholdt (R)	Charles F. Joy (R)	George C. R. Wagoner (R)	Edward Robb (D)	Willard Duncan Vandiver (D)	Maecenas E. Benton (D)	
58th (1903–1905)	James T. Lloyd (D)	William W. Rucker (D)	John Dougherty (D)	Charles F. Cochran (D)	William S. Cowherd (D)	David A. De Armond (D)	Courtney W. Hamlin (D)	Dorsey W. Shackleford (D)	Champ Clark (D)	Richard Bartholdt (R)	John T. Hunt (D)	James Joseph Butler (D)	Edward Robb (D)	Willard Duncan Vandiver (D)	Maecenas E. Benton (D)	J. Robert Lamar (D)
59th (1905–1907)	James T. Lloyd (D)	William W. Rucker (D)	Frank B. Klepper (R)	Frank B. Fulkerson (R)	Edgar C. Ellis (R)	David A. De Armond (D)	John Welborn (R)	Dorsey W. Shackleford (D)	Champ Clark (D)	Richard Bartholdt (R)	John T. Hunt (D)	Ernest E. Wood (D)	Marion E. Rhodes (R)	William T. Tyndall (R)	Cassius M. Shartel (R)	Arthur P. Murphy (R)
59th (1905–1907)	James T. Lloyd (D)	William W. Rucker (D)	Frank B. Klepper (R)	Frank B. Fulkerson (R)	Edgar C. Ellis (R)	David A. De Armond (D)	John Welborn (R)	Dorsey W. Shackleford (D)	Champ Clark (D)	Richard Bartholdt (R)	John T. Hunt (D)	Harry M. Coudrey (R)	Marion E. Rhodes (R)	William T. Tyndall (R)	Cassius M. Shartel (R)	Arthur P. Murphy (R)
60th (1907–1909)	James T. Lloyd (D)	William W. Rucker (D)	Joshua W. Alexander (D)	Charles F. Booher (D)	Edgar C. Ellis (R)	David A. De Armond (D)	Courtney W. Hamlin (D)	Dorsey W. Shackleford (D)	Champ Clark (D)	Richard Bartholdt (R)	Henry S. Caulfield (R)	Harry M. Coudrey (R)	Madison R. Smith (D)	Joseph J. Russell (D)	Thomas Hackney (D)	J. Robert Lamar (D)
61st (1909–1911)	James T. Lloyd (D)	William W. Rucker (D)	Joshua W. Alexander (D)	Charles F. Booher (D)	William P. Borland (D)	David A. De Armond (D)	Courtney W. Hamlin (D)	Dorsey W. Shackleford (D)	Champ Clark (D)	Richard Bartholdt (R)	Patrick F. Gill (D)	Harry M. Coudrey (R)	Politte Elvins (R)	Charles A. Crow (R)	Charles H. Morgan (R)	Arthur P. Murphy (R)
61st (1909–1911)	James T. Lloyd (D)	William W. Rucker (D)	Joshua W. Alexander (D)	Charles F. Booher (D)	William P. Borland (D)	Clement C. Dickinson (D)	Courtney W. Hamlin (D)	Dorsey W. Shackleford (D)	Champ Clark (D)	Richard Bartholdt (R)	Patrick F. Gill (D)	Harry M. Coudrey (R)	Politte Elvins (R)	Charles A. Crow (R)	Charles H. Morgan (R)	Arthur P. Murphy (R)
62nd (1911–1913)	James T. Lloyd (D)	William W. Rucker (D)	Joshua W. Alexander (D)	Charles F. Booher (D)	William P. Borland (D)	Clement C. Dickinson (D)	Courtney W. Hamlin (D)	Dorsey W. Shackleford (D)	Champ Clark (D)	Richard Bartholdt (R)	Theron E. Catlin (R)	Leonidas C. Dyer (R)	Walter Lewis Hensley (D)	Joseph J. Russell (D)	James A. Daugherty (D)	Thomas L. Rubey (D)
62nd (1911–1913)	James T. Lloyd (D)	William W. Rucker (D)	Joshua W. Alexander (D)	Charles F. Booher (D)	William P. Borland (D)	Clement C. Dickinson (D)	Courtney W. Hamlin (D)	Dorsey W. Shackleford (D)	Champ Clark (D)	Richard Bartholdt (R)	Patrick F. Gill (D)	Leonidas C. Dyer (R)	Walter Lewis Hensley (D)	Joseph J. Russell (D)	James A. Daugherty (D)	Thomas L. Rubey (D)
63rd (1913–1915)	James T. Lloyd (D)	William W. Rucker (D)	Joshua W. Alexander (D)	Charles F. Booher (D)	William P. Borland (D)	Clement C. Dickinson (D)	Courtney W. Hamlin (D)	Dorsey W. Shackleford (D)	Champ Clark (D)	Richard Bartholdt (R)	William L. Igoe (D)	Michael Joseph Gill (D)	Walter Lewis Hensley (D)	Joseph J. Russell (D)	Perl D. Decker (D)	Thomas L. Rubey (D)
63rd (1913–1915)	James T. Lloyd (D)	William W. Rucker (D)	Joshua W. Alexander (D)	Charles F. Booher (D)	William P. Borland (D)	Clement C. Dickinson (D)	Courtney W. Hamlin (D)	Dorsey W. Shackleford (D)	Champ Clark (D)	Richard Bartholdt (R)	William L. Igoe (D)	Leonidas C. Dyer (R)	Walter Lewis Hensley (D)	Joseph J. Russell (D)	Perl D. Decker (D)	Thomas L. Rubey (D)
64th (1915–1917)	James T. Lloyd (D)	William W. Rucker (D)	Joshua W. Alexander (D)	Charles F. Booher (D)	William P. Borland (D)	Clement C. Dickinson (D)	Courtney W. Hamlin (D)	Dorsey W. Shackleford (D)	Champ Clark (D)	Jacob Edwin Meeker (R)	William L. Igoe (D)	Leonidas C. Dyer (R)	Walter Lewis Hensley (D)	Joseph J. Russell (D)	Perl D. Decker (D)	Thomas L. Rubey (D)
65th (1917–1919)	Milton A. Romjue (D)	William W. Rucker (D)	Joshua W. Alexander (D)	Charles F. Booher (D)	William P. Borland (D)	Clement C. Dickinson (D)	Courtney W. Hamlin (D)	Dorsey W. Shackleford (D)	Champ Clark (D)	Jacob Edwin Meeker (R)	William L. Igoe (D)	Leonidas C. Dyer (R)	Walter Lewis Hensley (D)	Joseph J. Russell (D)	Perl D. Decker (D)	Thomas L. Rubey (D)
65th (1917–1919)	Milton A. Romjue (D)	William W. Rucker (D)	Joshua W. Alexander (D)	Charles F. Booher (D)	William P. Borland (D)	Clement C. Dickinson (D)	Courtney W. Hamlin (D)	Dorsey W. Shackleford (D)	Champ Clark (D)	Frederick Essen (R)	William L. Igoe (D)	Leonidas C. Dyer (R)	Walter Lewis Hensley (D)	Joseph J. Russell (D)	Perl D. Decker (D)	Thomas L. Rubey (D)
66th (1919–1921)	Milton A. Romjue (D)	William W. Rucker (D)	Joshua W. Alexander (D)	Charles F. Booher (D)	William T. Bland (D)	Clement C. Dickinson (D)	Samuel C. Major (D)	William L. Nelson (D)	Champ Clark (D)	Cleveland A. Newton (R)	William L. Igoe (D)	Leonidas C. Dyer (R)	Marion E. Rhodes (R)	Edward D. Hays (R)	Isaac V. McPherson (R)	Thomas L. Rubey (D)
66th (1919–1921)	Milton A. Romjue (D)	William W. Rucker (D)	Jacob L. Milligan (D)	Charles F. Booher (D)	William T. Bland (D)	Clement C. Dickinson (D)	Samuel C. Major (D)	William L. Nelson (D)	Champ Clark (D)	Cleveland A. Newton (R)	William L. Igoe (D)	Leonidas C. Dyer (R)	Marion E. Rhodes (R)	Edward D. Hays (R)	Isaac V. McPherson (R)	Thomas L. Rubey (D)
67th (1921–1923)	Frank C. Millspaugh (R)	William W. Rucker (D)	Henry F. Lawrence (R)	Charles L. Faust (R)	Edgar C. Ellis (R)	William O. Atkeson (R)	Roscoe C. Patterson (R)	Sidney C. Roach (R)	Theodore W. Hukriede (R)	Cleveland A. Newton (R)	Harry B. Hawes (D)	Leonidas C. Dyer (R)	Marion E. Rhodes (R)	Edward D. Hays (R)	Isaac V. McPherson (R)	Samuel A. Shelton (R)
68th (1923–1925)	Milton A. Romjue (D)	Ralph F. Lozier (D)	Jacob L. Milligan (D)	Charles L. Faust (R)	Henry L. Jost (D)	Clement C. Dickinson (D)	Samuel C. Major (D)	Sidney C. Roach (R)	Clarence Cannon (D)	Cleveland A. Newton (R)	Harry B. Hawes (D)	Leonidas C. Dyer (R)	J. Scott Wolff (D)	James F. Fulbright (D)	Joe J. Manlove (R)	Thomas L. Rubey (D)
69th (1925–1927)	Milton A. Romjue (D)	Ralph F. Lozier (D)	Jacob L. Milligan (D)	Charles L. Faust (R)	Edgar C. Ellis (R)	Clement C. Dickinson (D)	Samuel C. Major (D)	William L. Nelson (D)	Clarence Cannon (D)	Cleveland A. Newton (R)	Harry B. Hawes (D)	Leonidas C. Dyer (R)	Charles E. Kiefner (R)	Ralph E. Bailey (R)	Joe J. Manlove (R)	Thomas L. Rubey (D)
69th (1925–1927)	Milton A. Romjue (D)	Ralph F. Lozier (D)	Jacob L. Milligan (D)	Charles L. Faust (R)	Edgar C. Ellis (R)	Clement C. Dickinson (D)	Samuel C. Major (D)	William L. Nelson (D)	Clarence Cannon (D)	Cleveland A. Newton (R)	John J. Cochran (D)	Leonidas C. Dyer (R)	Charles E. Kiefner (R)	Ralph E. Bailey (R)	Joe J. Manlove (R)	Thomas L. Rubey (D)
70th (1927–1929)	Milton A. Romjue (D)	Ralph F. Lozier (D)	Jacob L. Milligan (D)	Charles L. Faust (R)	George H. Combs Jr. (D)	Clement C. Dickinson (D)	Samuel C. Major (D)	William L. Nelson (D)	Clarence Cannon (D)	Henry F. Niedringhaus (R)	John J. Cochran (D)	Leonidas C. Dyer (R)	Clyde Williams (D)	James F. Fulbright (D)	Joe J. Manlove (R)	Thomas L. Rubey (D)
70th (1927–1929)	Milton A. Romjue (D)	Ralph F. Lozier (D)	Jacob L. Milligan (D)	David W. Hopkins (R)	George H. Combs Jr. (D)	Clement C. Dickinson (D)	Samuel C. Major (D)	William L. Nelson (D)	Clarence Cannon (D)	Henry F. Niedringhaus (R)	John J. Cochran (D)	Leonidas C. Dyer (R)	Clyde Williams (D)	James F. Fulbright (D)	Joe J. Manlove (R)	Thomas L. Rubey (D)
71st (1929–1931)	Milton A. Romjue (D)	Ralph F. Lozier (D)	Jacob L. Milligan (D)	David W. Hopkins (R)	Edgar C. Ellis (R)	Thomas J. Halsey (R)	John W. Palmer (R)	William L. Nelson (D)	Clarence Cannon (D)	Henry F. Niedringhaus (R)	John J. Cochran (D)	Leonidas C. Dyer (R)	Charles E. Kiefner (R)	Dewey Short (R)	Joe J. Manlove (R)	Rowland L. Johnston (R)
72nd (1931–1933)	Milton A. Romjue (D)	Ralph F. Lozier (D)	Jacob L. Milligan (D)	David W. Hopkins (R)	Joe Shannon (D)	Clement C. Dickinson (D)	Samuel C. Major (D)	William L. Nelson (D)	Clarence Cannon (D)	Henry F. Niedringhaus (R)	John J. Cochran (D)	Leonidas C. Dyer (R)	Clyde Williams (D)	James F. Fulbright (D)	Joe J. Manlove (R)	William E. Barton (D)
72nd (1931–1933)	Milton A. Romjue (D)	Ralph F. Lozier (D)	Jacob L. Milligan (D)	David W. Hopkins (R)	Joe Shannon (D)	Clement C. Dickinson (D)	Robert D. Johnson (D)	William L. Nelson (D)	Clarence Cannon (D)	Henry F. Niedringhaus (R)	John J. Cochran (D)	Leonidas C. Dyer (R)	Clyde Williams (D)	James F. Fulbright (D)	Joe J. Manlove (R)	William E. Barton (D)

==== 1933–1953 ====
Congress	Elected at-large on a general ticket.												
Congress	1st seat	2nd seat	3rd seat	4th seat	5th seat	6th seat	7th seat	8th seat	9th seat	10th seat	11th seat	12th seat	13th seat
73rd (1933–1935)	Milton A. Romjue (D)	Ralph F. Lozier (D)	Richard M. Duncan (D)	Jacob L. Milligan (D)	Joe; Shannon (D)	Reuben T. Wood (D)	Clement C. Dickinson (D)	Clyde; Williams (D)	Clarence; Cannon (D)	Frank H. Lee (D)	James E. Ruffin (D)	James R. Claiborne (D)	John J. Cochran (D)
Congress	District												
Congress	1st	2nd	3rd	4th	5th	6th	7th	8th	9th	10th	11th	12th	13th
74th (1935–1937)	Milton A. Romjue (D)	William L. Nelson (D)	Richard M. Duncan (D)	C. Jasper; Bell (D)	Joe Shannon (D)	Reuben T. Wood (D)	Dewey; Short (R)	Clyde; Williams (D)	Clarence; Cannon (D)	Orville; Zimmerman (D)	Thomas C. Hennings Jr. (D)	James R. Claiborne (D)	John J. Cochran (D)
75th (1937–1939)	Milton A. Romjue (D)	William L. Nelson (D)	Richard M. Duncan (D)	C. Jasper; Bell (D)	Joe Shannon (D)	Reuben T. Wood (D)	Dewey; Short (R)	Clyde; Williams (D)	Clarence; Cannon (D)	Orville; Zimmerman (D)	Thomas C. Hennings Jr. (D)	C. Arthur; Anderson (D)	John J. Cochran (D)
76th (1939–1941)	Milton A. Romjue (D)	William L. Nelson (D)	Richard M. Duncan (D)	C. Jasper; Bell (D)	Joe Shannon (D)	Reuben T. Wood (D)	Dewey; Short (R)	Clyde; Williams (D)	Clarence; Cannon (D)	Orville; Zimmerman (D)	Thomas C. Hennings Jr. (D)	C. Arthur; Anderson (D)	John J. Cochran (D)
77th (1941–1943)	Milton A. Romjue (D)	William L. Nelson (D)	Richard M. Duncan (D)	C. Jasper; Bell (D)	Joe Shannon (D)	Philip A. Bennett (R)	Dewey; Short (R)	Clyde; Williams (D)	Clarence; Cannon (D)	Orville; Zimmerman (D)	John B. Sullivan (D)	Walter C. Ploeser (R)	John J. Cochran (D)
78th (1943–1945)	Samuel W. Arnold (R)	Max; Schwabe (R)	William Clay; Cole (R)	C. Jasper; Bell (D)	Roger C. Slaughter (D)	Marion T. Bennett (R)	Dewey; Short (R)	William P. Elmer (R)	Clarence; Cannon (D)	Orville; Zimmerman (D)	Louis E. Miller (R)	Walter C. Ploeser (R)	John J. Cochran (D)
79th (1945–1947)	Samuel W. Arnold (R)	Max; Schwabe (R)	William Clay; Cole (R)	C. Jasper; Bell (D)	Roger C. Slaughter (D)	Marion T. Bennett (R)	Dewey; Short (R)	A. S. J. Carnahan (D)	Clarence; Cannon (D)	Orville; Zimmerman (D)	John B. Sullivan (D)	Walter C. Ploeser (R)	John J. Cochran (D)
80th (1947–1949)	Samuel W. Arnold (R)	Max; Schwabe (R)	William Clay; Cole (R)	C. Jasper; Bell (D)	Albert L. Reeves Jr. (R)	Marion T. Bennett (R)	Dewey; Short (R)	Parke M. Banta (R)	Clarence; Cannon (D)	Orville; Zimmerman (D)	Claude I. Bakewell (R)	Walter C. Ploeser (R)	Frank M. Karsten (D)
80th (1947–1949)	Samuel W. Arnold (R)	Max; Schwabe (R)	William Clay; Cole (R)	C. Jasper; Bell (D)	Albert L. Reeves Jr. (R)	Marion T. Bennett (R)	Dewey; Short (R)	Parke M. Banta (R)	Clarence; Cannon (D)	Paul C. Jones (D)	Claude I. Bakewell (R)	Walter C. Ploeser (R)	Frank M. Karsten (D)
81st (1949–1951)	Clare; Magee (D)	Morgan M. Moulder (D)	Phil J. Welch (D)	Leonard; Irving (D)	Richard W. Bolling (D)	George H. Christopher (D)	Dewey; Short (R)	A. S. J. Carnahan (D)	Clarence; Cannon (D)	Paul C. Jones (D)	John B. Sullivan (D)	Raymond W. Karst (D)	Frank M. Karsten (D)
82nd (1951–1953)	Clare; Magee (D)	Morgan M. Moulder (D)	Phil J. Welch (D)	Leonard; Irving (D)	Richard W. Bolling (D)	Orland K. Armstrong (R)	Dewey; Short (R)	A. S. J. Carnahan (D)	Clarence; Cannon (D)	Paul C. Jones (D)	John B. Sullivan (D)	Thomas B. Curtis (R)	Frank M. Karsten (D)
82nd (1951–1953)	Clare; Magee (D)	Morgan M. Moulder (D)	Phil J. Welch (D)	Leonard; Irving (D)	Richard W. Bolling (D)	Orland K. Armstrong (R)	Dewey; Short (R)	A. S. J. Carnahan (D)	Clarence; Cannon (D)	Paul C. Jones (D)	Claude I. Bakewell (R)	Thomas B. Curtis (R)	Frank M. Karsten (D)

==== 1953–1983 ====
Congress	District										
Congress	1st	2nd	3rd	4th	5th	6th	7th	8th	9th	10th	11th
83rd (1953–1955)	Frank M. Karsten (D)	Thomas B. Curtis (R)	Leonor; Sullivan (D)	Jeffrey P. Hillelson (R)	Richard W. Bolling (D)	William Clay; Cole (R)	Dewey; Short (R)	A. S. J. Carnahan (D)	Clarence; Cannon (D)	Paul C. Jones (D)	Morgan M. Moulder (D)
84th (1955–1957)	Frank M. Karsten (D)	Thomas B. Curtis (R)	Leonor; Sullivan (D)	George H. Christopher (D)	Richard W. Bolling (D)	William R. Hull Jr. (D)	Dewey; Short (R)	A. S. J. Carnahan (D)	Clarence; Cannon (D)	Paul C. Jones (D)	Morgan M. Moulder (D)
85th (1957–1959)	Frank M. Karsten (D)	Thomas B. Curtis (R)	Leonor; Sullivan (D)	George H. Christopher (D)	Richard W. Bolling (D)	William R. Hull Jr. (D)	Charles Harrison; Brown (D)	A. S. J. Carnahan (D)	Clarence; Cannon (D)	Paul C. Jones (D)	Morgan M. Moulder (D)
86th (1959–1961)	Frank M. Karsten (D)	Thomas B. Curtis (R)	Leonor; Sullivan (D)	George H. Christopher (D)	Richard W. Bolling (D)	William R. Hull Jr. (D)	Charles Harrison; Brown (D)	A. S. J. Carnahan (D)	Clarence; Cannon (D)	Paul C. Jones (D)	Morgan M. Moulder (D)
86th (1959–1961)	Frank M. Karsten (D)	Thomas B. Curtis (R)	Leonor; Sullivan (D)	William J. Randall (D)	Richard W. Bolling (D)	William R. Hull Jr. (D)	Charles Harrison; Brown (D)	A. S. J. Carnahan (D)	Clarence; Cannon (D)	Paul C. Jones (D)	Morgan M. Moulder (D)
87th (1961–1963)	Frank M. Karsten (D)	Thomas B. Curtis (R)	Leonor; Sullivan (D)	William J. Randall (D)	Richard W. Bolling (D)	William R. Hull Jr. (D)	Durward G. Hall (R)	Richard H. Ichord (D)	Clarence; Cannon (D)	Paul C. Jones (D)	Morgan M. Moulder (D)
88th (1963–1965)	Frank M. Karsten (D)	Thomas B. Curtis (R)	Leonor; Sullivan (D)	William J. Randall (D)	Richard W. Bolling (D)	William R. Hull Jr. (D)	Durward G. Hall (R)	Richard H. Ichord (D)	Clarence; Cannon (D)	Paul C. Jones (D)	
88th (1963–1965)	Frank M. Karsten (D)	Thomas B. Curtis (R)	Leonor; Sullivan (D)	William J. Randall (D)	Richard W. Bolling (D)	William R. Hull Jr. (D)	Durward G. Hall (R)	Richard H. Ichord (D)	William L. Hungate (D)	Paul C. Jones (D)	
89th (1965–1967)	Frank M. Karsten (D)	Thomas B. Curtis (R)	Leonor; Sullivan (D)	William J. Randall (D)	Richard W. Bolling (D)	William R. Hull Jr. (D)	Durward G. Hall (R)	Richard H. Ichord (D)	William L. Hungate (D)	Paul C. Jones (D)	
90th (1967–1969)	Frank M. Karsten (D)	Thomas B. Curtis (R)	Leonor; Sullivan (D)	William J. Randall (D)	Richard W. Bolling (D)	William R. Hull Jr. (D)	Durward G. Hall (R)	Richard H. Ichord (D)	William L. Hungate (D)	Paul C. Jones (D)	
91st (1969–1971)	Bill; Clay (D)	James W. Symington (D)	Leonor; Sullivan (D)	William J. Randall (D)	Richard W. Bolling (D)	William R. Hull Jr. (D)	Durward G. Hall (R)	Richard H. Ichord (D)	William L. Hungate (D)	Bill; Burlison (D)	
92nd (1971–1973)	Bill; Clay (D)	James W. Symington (D)	Leonor; Sullivan (D)	William J. Randall (D)	Richard W. Bolling (D)	William R. Hull Jr. (D)	Durward G. Hall (R)	Richard H. Ichord (D)	William L. Hungate (D)	Bill; Burlison (D)	
93rd (1973–1975)	Bill; Clay (D)	James W. Symington (D)	Leonor; Sullivan (D)	William J. Randall (D)	Richard W. Bolling (D)	Jerry; Litton (D)	Gene Taylor (R)	Richard H. Ichord (D)	William L. Hungate (D)	Bill; Burlison (D)	
94th (1975–1977)	Bill; Clay (D)	James W. Symington (D)	Leonor; Sullivan (D)	William J. Randall (D)	Richard W. Bolling (D)	Jerry; Litton (D)	Gene Taylor (R)	Richard H. Ichord (D)	William L. Hungate (D)	Bill; Burlison (D)	
94th (1975–1977)	Bill; Clay (D)	James W. Symington (D)	Leonor; Sullivan (D)	William J. Randall (D)	Richard W. Bolling (D)	Tom; Coleman (R)	Gene Taylor (R)	Richard H. Ichord (D)	William L. Hungate (D)	Bill; Burlison (D)	
95th (1977–1979)	Bill; Clay (D)	Robert A. Young (D)	Dick; Gephardt (D)	Ike; Skelton (D)	Richard W. Bolling (D)	Tom; Coleman (R)	Gene Taylor (R)	Richard H. Ichord (D)	Harold; Volkmer (D)	Bill; Burlison (D)	
96th (1979–1981)	Bill; Clay (D)	Robert A. Young (D)	Dick; Gephardt (D)	Ike; Skelton (D)	Richard W. Bolling (D)	Tom; Coleman (R)	Gene Taylor (R)	Richard H. Ichord (D)	Harold; Volkmer (D)	Bill; Burlison (D)	
97th (1981–1983)	Bill; Clay (D)	Robert A. Young (D)	Dick; Gephardt (D)	Ike; Skelton (D)	Richard W. Bolling (D)	Tom; Coleman (R)	Gene Taylor (R)	Wendell; Bailey (R)	Harold; Volkmer (D)	Bill; Emerson (R)	

==== 1983–2013 ====
Congress	District								
Congress	1st	2nd	3rd	4th	5th	6th	7th	8th	9th
98th (1983–1985)	Bill Clay (D)	Robert A. Young (D)	Dick Gephardt (D)	Ike Skelton (D)	Alan Wheat (D)	Tom Coleman (R)	Gene Taylor (R)	Bill Emerson (R)	Harold Volkmer (D)
99th (1985–1987)	Bill Clay (D)	Robert A. Young (D)	Dick Gephardt (D)	Ike Skelton (D)	Alan Wheat (D)	Tom Coleman (R)	Gene Taylor (R)	Bill Emerson (R)	Harold Volkmer (D)
100th (1987–1989)	Bill Clay (D)	Jack Buechner (R)	Dick Gephardt (D)	Ike Skelton (D)	Alan Wheat (D)	Tom Coleman (R)	Gene Taylor (R)	Bill Emerson (R)	Harold Volkmer (D)
101st (1989–1991)	Bill Clay (D)	Jack Buechner (R)	Dick Gephardt (D)	Ike Skelton (D)	Alan Wheat (D)	Tom Coleman (R)	Mel Hancock (R)	Bill Emerson (R)	Harold Volkmer (D)
102nd (1991–1993)	Bill Clay (D)	Joan Kelly Horn (D)	Dick Gephardt (D)	Ike Skelton (D)	Alan Wheat (D)	Tom Coleman (R)	Mel Hancock (R)	Bill Emerson (R)	Harold Volkmer (D)
103rd (1993–1995)	Bill Clay (D)	Jim Talent (R)	Dick Gephardt (D)	Ike Skelton (D)	Alan Wheat (D)	Pat Danner (D)	Mel Hancock (R)	Bill Emerson (R)	Harold Volkmer (D)
104th (1995–1997)	Bill Clay (D)	Jim Talent (R)	Dick Gephardt (D)	Ike Skelton (D)	Karen McCarthy (D)	Pat Danner (D)	Mel Hancock (R)	Bill Emerson (R)	Harold Volkmer (D)
104th (1995–1997)	Bill Clay (D)	Jim Talent (R)	Dick Gephardt (D)	Ike Skelton (D)	Karen McCarthy (D)	Pat Danner (D)	Mel Hancock (R)	Jo Ann Emerson (R)	Harold Volkmer (D)
105th (1997–1999)	Bill Clay (D)	Jim Talent (R)	Dick Gephardt (D)	Ike Skelton (D)	Karen McCarthy (D)	Pat Danner (D)	Roy Blunt (R)	Jo Ann Emerson (I)	Kenny Hulshof (R)
105th (1997–1999)	Bill Clay (D)	Jim Talent (R)	Dick Gephardt (D)	Ike Skelton (D)	Karen McCarthy (D)	Pat Danner (D)	Roy Blunt (R)	Jo Ann Emerson (R)	Kenny Hulshof (R)
106th (1999–2001)	Bill Clay (D)	Jim Talent (R)	Dick Gephardt (D)	Ike Skelton (D)	Karen McCarthy (D)	Pat Danner (D)	Roy Blunt (R)	Jo Ann Emerson (R)	Kenny Hulshof (R)
107th (2001–2003)	Lacy Clay (D)	Todd Akin (R)	Dick Gephardt (D)	Ike Skelton (D)	Karen McCarthy (D)	Sam Graves (R)	Roy Blunt (R)	Jo Ann Emerson (R)	Kenny Hulshof (R)
108th (2003–2005)	Lacy Clay (D)	Todd Akin (R)	Dick Gephardt (D)	Ike Skelton (D)	Karen McCarthy (D)	Sam Graves (R)	Roy Blunt (R)	Jo Ann Emerson (R)	Kenny Hulshof (R)
109th (2005–2007)	Lacy Clay (D)	Todd Akin (R)	Russ Carnahan (D)	Ike Skelton (D)	Emanuel Cleaver (D)	Sam Graves (R)	Roy Blunt (R)	Jo Ann Emerson (R)	Kenny Hulshof (R)
110th (2007–2009)	Lacy Clay (D)	Todd Akin (R)	Russ Carnahan (D)	Ike Skelton (D)	Emanuel Cleaver (D)	Sam Graves (R)	Roy Blunt (R)	Jo Ann Emerson (R)	Kenny Hulshof (R)
111th (2009–2011)	Lacy Clay (D)	Todd Akin (R)	Russ Carnahan (D)	Ike Skelton (D)	Emanuel Cleaver (D)	Sam Graves (R)	Roy Blunt (R)	Jo Ann Emerson (R)	Blaine; Luetkemeyer (R)
112th (2011–2013)	Lacy Clay (D)	Todd Akin (R)	Russ Carnahan (D)	Vicky Hartzler (R)	Emanuel Cleaver (D)	Sam Graves (R)	Billy Long (R)	Jo Ann Emerson (R)	Blaine; Luetkemeyer (R)

==== 2013–present ====
Congress	District							
Congress	1st	2nd	3rd	4th	5th	6th	7th	8th
113th (2013–2015)	Lacy Clay (D)	Ann Wagner (R)	Blaine; Luetkemeyer (R)	Vicky Hartzler (R)	Emanuel Cleaver (D)	Sam Graves (R)	Billy Long (R)	Jo Ann Emerson (R)
113th (2013–2015)	Lacy Clay (D)	Ann Wagner (R)	Blaine; Luetkemeyer (R)	Vicky Hartzler (R)	Emanuel Cleaver (D)	Sam Graves (R)	Billy Long (R)	Jason Smith (R)
114th (2015–2017)	Lacy Clay (D)	Ann Wagner (R)	Blaine; Luetkemeyer (R)	Vicky Hartzler (R)	Emanuel Cleaver (D)	Sam Graves (R)	Billy Long (R)	Jason Smith (R)
115th (2017–2019)	Lacy Clay (D)	Ann Wagner (R)	Blaine; Luetkemeyer (R)	Vicky Hartzler (R)	Emanuel Cleaver (D)	Sam Graves (R)	Billy Long (R)	Jason Smith (R)
116th (2019–2021)	Lacy Clay (D)	Ann Wagner (R)	Blaine; Luetkemeyer (R)	Vicky Hartzler (R)	Emanuel Cleaver (D)	Sam Graves (R)	Billy Long (R)	Jason Smith (R)
117th (2021–2023)	Cori Bush (D)	Ann Wagner (R)	Blaine; Luetkemeyer (R)	Vicky Hartzler (R)	Emanuel Cleaver (D)	Sam Graves (R)	Billy Long (R)	Jason Smith (R)
118th (2023–2025)	Cori Bush (D)	Ann Wagner (R)	Blaine; Luetkemeyer (R)	Mark Alford (R)	Emanuel Cleaver (D)	Sam Graves (R)	Eric Burlison (R)	Jason Smith (R)
119th (2025–2027)	Wesley Bell (D)	Ann Wagner (R)	Bob Onder (R)	Mark Alford (R)	Emanuel Cleaver (D)	Sam Graves (R)	Eric Burlison (R)	Jason Smith (R)
120th (2027–2029)	Wesley Bell (D)	Fred Wellman (D)	Bob Onder (R)	Mark Alford (R)	Emanuel Cleaver (D)	Chris Stigall (D)	Eric Burlison (R)	Jason Smith (R)

== United States Senate ==
Current U.S. senators from Missouri
Missouri CPVI (2025): R+9	Class I senator	Class III senator
Missouri CPVI (2025): R+9	Josh Hawley (Senior senator) (Ozark)	Eric Schmitt (Junior senator) (Glendale)
Party	Republican	Republican
Incumbent since	January 3, 2019	January 3, 2023

Class I senator	Congress	Class III senator
Thomas Hart Benton (DR)	17th (1821–1823)	David Barton (DR)
Thomas Hart Benton (DR)	18th (1823–1825)	David Barton (DR)
Thomas Hart Benton (J)	19th (1825–1827)	David Barton (NR)
Thomas Hart Benton (J)	20th (1827–1829)	David Barton (NR)
Thomas Hart Benton (J)	21st (1829–1831)	David Barton (NR)
Thomas Hart Benton (J)	22nd (1831–1833)	Alexander Buckner (J)
Thomas Hart Benton (J)	23rd (1833–1835)	Alexander Buckner (J)
Thomas Hart Benton (J)	23rd (1833–1835)	Lewis F. Linn (J)
Thomas Hart Benton (J)	24th (1835–1837)	Lewis F. Linn (J)
Thomas Hart Benton (D)	25th (1837–1839)	Lewis F. Linn (D)
Thomas Hart Benton (D)	26th (1839–1841)	Lewis F. Linn (D)
Thomas Hart Benton (D)	27th (1841–1843)	Lewis F. Linn (D)
Thomas Hart Benton (D)	28th (1843–1845)	Lewis F. Linn (D)
Thomas Hart Benton (D)	28th (1843–1845)	David Rice Atchison (D)
Thomas Hart Benton (D)	29th (1845–1847)	David Rice Atchison (D)
Thomas Hart Benton (D)	30th (1847–1849)	David Rice Atchison (D)
Thomas Hart Benton (D)	31st (1849–1851)	David Rice Atchison (D)
Henry S. Geyer (W)	32nd (1851–1853)	David Rice Atchison (D)
Henry S. Geyer (W)	33rd (1853–1855)	David Rice Atchison (D)
Henry S. Geyer (W)	34th (1855–1857)	James S. Green (D)
Trusten Polk (D)	35th (1857–1859)	James S. Green (D)
Trusten Polk (D)	36th (1859–1861)	James S. Green (D)
Trusten Polk (D)	37th (1861–1863)	Waldo P. Johnson (D)
John B. Henderson (U)	37th (1861–1863)	Robert Wilson (U)
John B. Henderson (RU)	38th (1863–1865)	Robert Wilson (U)
John B. Henderson (RU)	38th (1863–1865)	B. Gratz Brown (RU)
John B. Henderson (RU)	39th (1865–1867)	B. Gratz Brown (RU)
John B. Henderson (RU)	40th (1867–1869)	Charles D. Drake (RU)
Carl Schurz (RU)	41st (1869–1871)	Charles D. Drake (RU)
Carl Schurz (RU)	41st (1869–1871)	Daniel T. Jewett (RU)
Carl Schurz (RU)	41st (1869–1871)	Francis Preston Blair Jr. (D)
Carl Schurz (LR)	42nd (1871–1873)	Francis Preston Blair Jr. (D)
Carl Schurz (LR)	43rd (1873–1875)	Lewis V. Bogy (D)
Francis Cockrell (D)	44th (1875–1877)	Lewis V. Bogy (D)
Francis Cockrell (D)	45th (1877–1879)	Lewis V. Bogy (D)
Francis Cockrell (D)	45th (1877–1879)	David H. Armstrong (D)
Francis Cockrell (D)	45th (1877–1879)	James Shields (D)
Francis Cockrell (D)	46th (1879–1881)	George Graham Vest (D)
Francis Cockrell (D)	47th (1881–1883)	George Graham Vest (D)
Francis Cockrell (D)	48th (1883–1885)	George Graham Vest (D)
Francis Cockrell (D)	49th (1885–1887)	George Graham Vest (D)
Francis Cockrell (D)	50th (1887–1889)	George Graham Vest (D)
Francis Cockrell (D)	51st (1889–1891)	George Graham Vest (D)
Francis Cockrell (D)	52nd (1891–1893)	George Graham Vest (D)
Francis Cockrell (D)	53rd (1893–1895)	George Graham Vest (D)
Francis Cockrell (D)	54th (1895–1897)	George Graham Vest (D)
Francis Cockrell (D)	55th (1897–1899)	George Graham Vest (D)
Francis Cockrell (D)	56th (1899–1901)	George Graham Vest (D)
Francis Cockrell (D)	57th (1901–1903)	George Graham Vest (D)
Francis Cockrell (D)	58th (1903–1905)	William J. Stone (D)
William Warner (R)	59th (1905–1907)	William J. Stone (D)
William Warner (R)	60th (1907–1909)	William J. Stone (D)
William Warner (R)	61st (1909–1911)	William J. Stone (D)
James A. Reed (D)	62nd (1911–1913)	William J. Stone (D)
James A. Reed (D)	63rd (1913–1915)	William J. Stone (D)
James A. Reed (D)	64th (1915–1917)	William J. Stone (D)
James A. Reed (D)	65th (1917–1919)	William J. Stone (D)
James A. Reed (D)	65th (1917–1919)	Xenophon P. Wilfley (D)
James A. Reed (D)	65th (1917–1919)	Selden P. Spencer (R)
James A. Reed (D)	66th (1919–1921)	Selden P. Spencer (R)
James A. Reed (D)	67th (1921–1923)	Selden P. Spencer (R)
James A. Reed (D)	68th (1923–1925)	Selden P. Spencer (R)
James A. Reed (D)	69th (1925–1927)	Selden P. Spencer (R)
James A. Reed (D)	69th (1925–1927)	George H. Williams (R)
James A. Reed (D)	69th (1925–1927)	Harry B. Hawes (D)
James A. Reed (D)	70th (1927–1929)	Harry B. Hawes (D)
Roscoe C. Patterson (R)	71st (1929–1931)	Harry B. Hawes (D)
Roscoe C. Patterson (R)	72nd (1931–1933)	Harry B. Hawes (D)
Roscoe C. Patterson (R)	72nd (1931–1933)	Bennett Champ Clark (D)
Roscoe C. Patterson (R)	73rd (1933–1935)	Bennett Champ Clark (D)
Harry S. Truman (D)	74th (1935–1937)	Bennett Champ Clark (D)
Harry S. Truman (D)	75th (1937–1939)	Bennett Champ Clark (D)
Harry S. Truman (D)	76th (1939–1941)	Bennett Champ Clark (D)
Harry S. Truman (D)	77th (1941–1943)	Bennett Champ Clark (D)
Harry S. Truman (D)	78th (1943–1945)	Bennett Champ Clark (D)
Harry S. Truman (D)	79th (1945–1947)	Forrest C. Donnell (R)
Frank P. Briggs (D)	79th (1945–1947)	Forrest C. Donnell (R)
James P. Kem (R)	80th (1947–1949)	Forrest C. Donnell (R)
James P. Kem (R)	81st (1949–1951)	Forrest C. Donnell (R)
James P. Kem (R)	82nd (1951–1953)	Thomas C. Hennings Jr. (D)
Stuart Symington (D)	83rd (1953–1955)	Thomas C. Hennings Jr. (D)
Stuart Symington (D)	84th (1955–1957)	Thomas C. Hennings Jr. (D)
Stuart Symington (D)	85th (1957–1959)	Thomas C. Hennings Jr. (D)
Stuart Symington (D)	86th (1959–1961)	Thomas C. Hennings Jr. (D)
Stuart Symington (D)	86th (1959–1961)	Edward V. Long (D)
Stuart Symington (D)	87th (1961–1963)	Edward V. Long (D)
Stuart Symington (D)	88th (1963–1965)	Edward V. Long (D)
Stuart Symington (D)	89th (1965–1967)	Edward V. Long (D)
Stuart Symington (D)	90th (1967–1969)	Edward V. Long (D)
Stuart Symington (D)	90th (1967–1969)	Thomas Eagleton (D)
Stuart Symington (D)	91st (1969–1971)	Thomas Eagleton (D)
Stuart Symington (D)	92nd (1971–1973)	Thomas Eagleton (D)
Stuart Symington (D)	93rd (1973–1975)	Thomas Eagleton (D)
Stuart Symington (D)	94th (1975–1977)	Thomas Eagleton (D)
John Danforth (R)	94th (1975–1977)	Thomas Eagleton (D)
John Danforth (R)	95th (1977–1979)	Thomas Eagleton (D)
John Danforth (R)	96th (1979–1981)	Thomas Eagleton (D)
John Danforth (R)	97th (1981–1983)	Thomas Eagleton (D)
John Danforth (R)	98th (1983–1985)	Thomas Eagleton (D)
John Danforth (R)	99th (1985–1987)	Thomas Eagleton (D)
John Danforth (R)	100th (1987–1989)	Kit Bond (R)
John Danforth (R)	101st (1989–1991)	Kit Bond (R)
John Danforth (R)	102nd (1991–1993)	Kit Bond (R)
John Danforth (R)	103rd (1993–1995)	Kit Bond (R)
John Ashcroft (R)	104th (1995–1997)	Kit Bond (R)
John Ashcroft (R)	105th (1997–1999)	Kit Bond (R)
John Ashcroft (R)	106th (1999–2001)	Kit Bond (R)
Jean Carnahan (D) (Note: Carnahan's husband Mel Carnahan was elected to succeed incumbent Senator John Ashcroft, but died on October 16, 2000, on a plane crash, before the election was held. Carnahan was appointed to the same seat by newly-appointed governor Roger B. Wilson. Carnahan served until November 23, 2002, after she lost the 2002 United States Senate special election in Missouri to her successor, Jim Talent.)	107th (2001–2003)	Kit Bond (R)
Jim Talent (R)	107th (2001–2003)	Kit Bond (R)
Jim Talent (R)	108th (2003–2005)	Kit Bond (R)
Jim Talent (R)	109th (2005–2007)	Kit Bond (R)
Claire McCaskill (D)	110th (2007–2009)	Kit Bond (R)
Claire McCaskill (D)	111th (2009–2011)	Kit Bond (R)
Claire McCaskill (D)	112th (2011–2013)	Roy Blunt (R)
Claire McCaskill (D)	113th (2013–2015)	Roy Blunt (R)
Claire McCaskill (D)	114th (2015–2017)	Roy Blunt (R)
Claire McCaskill (D)	115th (2017–2019)	Roy Blunt (R)
Josh Hawley (R)	116th (2019–2021)	Roy Blunt (R)
Josh Hawley (R)	117th (2021–2023)	Roy Blunt (R)
Josh Hawley (R)	118th (2023–2025)	Eric Schmitt (R)
Josh Hawley (R)	119th (2025–2027)	Eric Schmitt (R)
Josh Hawley (R)	120th (2027–2029)	Eric Schmitt (R)

== Key ==
Constitutional Union (CU)
Democratic (D)
Democratic-Republican (DR)
Greenback (GB)
Independent Democrat (ID)
Independent Republican (IR)
Jacksonian (J)
Know Nothing (KN)
National Republican (NR)
Republican (R)
Union (U)
Unconditional Union (UU)
Whig (W)
Independent (I)

== See also ==
- List of United States congressional districts
- Missouri's congressional districts
- Political party strength in Missouri
