= Alfred Lamb =

Alfred Lamb may refer to:

- Alfred Lamb (Australian politician) (1845–1890), New South Wales politician
- Alfred W. Lamb (1824–1888), Missouri politician
