= New Hamburg, Missouri =

- Census-Designated Place
- Interactive map of New Hamburg, Missouri
- Coordinates: 37°07′35″N 89°35′36″W
- Country: United States
- State: Missouri
- County: Scott

Area
  - Total: 0.90 sq mi (2.33 km^{2})
  - Land: 0.89 sq mi (2.30 km^{2})
  - Water: 0.012 sq mi (0.03 km^{2})
- Elevation: 338 ft (103 m)

Population (2020)
  - Total: 218
  - Density: 246/sq mi (94.8/km^{2})
- FIPS code: 29-51842
- GNIS feature ID: 731624

New Hamburg is an unincorporated community in Scott County, in the U.S. state of Missouri.

== Demographics ==
Historical population
Census	Pop.	Note	%±
2020	218		—
U.S. Decennial Census

New Hamburg first appeared as a census designated place in the 2020 U.S. census.

== History ==
New Hamburg was originally called Hamburg, and under the latter name was platted in 1866. The community was named after Hamburg, in Germany, the native land of a large share of the first settlers. A post office called New Hamburg was established in 1874, and remained in operation until 1972.

== Education ==
It is in the Kelso C-7 School District, an elementary only district.

Three Rivers College's service area includes Scott County.

== Notable person ==
- Leo A. Herbst (1883–1969), mayor of Perryville, Missouri, was born in New Hamburg
