= James Fulbright =

James Fulbright is the name of:

- J. William Fulbright (1905–1995), U.S. Senator from Arkansas, promoter of the Fulbright Program of educational grants
- James F. Fulbright (1877–1948), U.S. Representative from Missouri
