= John J. Cochran =

American politician (1880–1947)

John Joseph Cochran
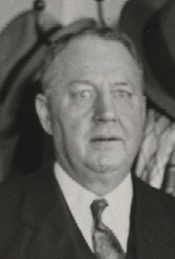
- Cochran in 1932

Member of the U.S. House of Representatives from Missouri
- In office November 2, 1926 – January 3, 1947
- Preceded by: Harry B. Hawes
- Succeeded by: Frank M. Karsten
- Constituency: 11th district (1926–1933) at-large district (1933–1935); 13th district (1935–1947)

Personal details
- Born: August 11, 1880 Webster Groves, Missouri, U.S.
- Died: March 6, 1947 (aged 66) St. Louis, Missouri, U.S.
- Resting place: Calvary Cemetery
- Party: Democratic

John Joseph Cochran (August 11, 1880 – March 6, 1947) was a U.S. Representative from Missouri.

Cochran was born in Webster Groves, Missouri; his father and maternal grandparents were Irish immigrants. He attended the public schools in Webster Groves. He was employed in the editorial department of various St. Louis newspapers for many years, and served as assistant to the election commissioners of St. Louis from 1911 to 1913.

In 1913 Cochran became secretary to Representative William L. Igoe 1913–1917, serving in that capacity again from 1918 to 1921.

Cochran was private secretary to United States Senator William J. Stone and clerk to the Committee on Foreign Relations of the United States Senate in 1917 and 1918.

Cochran studied law and was admitted to the bar in 1921 at St. Louis, Missouri, but did not engage in extensive practice. From 1921 through 1926 he served as secretary to Representative Harry B. Hawes.

Cochran was elected as a Democrat to the Sixty-ninth Congress to fill the vacancy caused by Hawes' resignation, and at the same time was elected to the Seventieth Congress. Cochran was reelected to the Seventy-first Congress, Seventy-second Congress, and Seventy-third Congress.

Cochran did not seek renomination in 1934, but ran unsuccessfully against Harry S. Truman for the Democratic nomination for U.S. Senator.

Subsequently, Cochran was nominated by convention and elected to the Seventy-fourth Congress, and reelected to the Seventy-fifth and to the four succeeding Congresses, serving from November 2, 1926, to January 3, 1947.

Cochran served as chairman of the Committee on Expenditures in Executive Departments (Seventy-second through Seventy-sixth Congresses), and the Committee on Accounts (Seventy-sixth through Seventy-ninth Congresses). He was not a candidate for renomination in 1946 to the Eightieth Congress.

Cochran died in St. Louis, Missouri, on March 6, 1947, and was interred in Calvary Cemetery.

The John Cochran Veterans Medical Center in St. Louis is named in his behalf.

U.S. House of Representatives
Preceded by Harry B. Hawes	Member of the U.S. House of Representatives from Missouri's 11th congressional district 1926–1933	Succeeded by James Edward Ruffin
Preceded by Clyde Williams	Member of the U.S. House of Representatives from Missouri's 13th congressional district 1933–1947	Succeeded by Frank M. Karsten
