= Politte Elvins =

American politician (1878–1943)

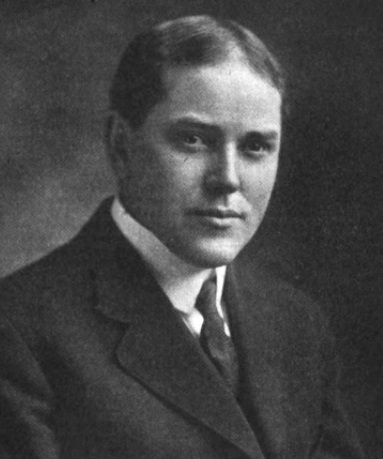
- From Volume IV (1921) of Centennial History of Missouri

Member of the U.S. House of Representatives from Missouri's 13th district
- In office March 4, 1909 – March 3, 1911
- Preceded by: Madison R. Smith
- Succeeded by: Walter L. Hensley

Personal details
- Born: March 16, 1878 French Village, Missouri, U.S.
- Died: January 14, 1943 (aged 64) McAllen, Texas, U.S.
- Party: Republican
- Education: University of Missouri

Politte Elvins (March 16, 1878 – January 14, 1943) was an American politician who served as the U.S. representative from Missouri's 13th congressional district between 1909 and 1911.

Born in French Village. St. Francois County, Missouri, Elvins attended the public schools. He graduated from Carleton College, Farmington, Missouri, in 1897 and from the law department of the University of Missouri in 1899. He was admitted to the bar the same year and commenced practice in Elvins, Missouri.

Elvins was elected as a Republican to the Sixty-first Congress (March 4, 1909 – March 3, 1911). He was an unsuccessful candidate for reelection in 1910 to the Sixty-second Congress. He resumed the practice of law in Elvins, Missouri. He served as delegate to the 1912 Republican National Convention. He served as chairman of the State Republican committee 1912–1914. He unsuccessfully ran for Senator in 1914, losing to Thomas Akins in the Republican primary. He moved to Bonne Terre, Missouri, in 1917 and continued the practice of law. He served as member and chairman of the committee on rules and order of business for the Missouri constitutional convention in 1922 and 1923. He moved to Pharr, Texas, in 1936. He was an unsuccessful candidate to the United States Senate in 1940. He died in McAllen, Texas, January 14, 1943. His remains were cremated.

U.S. House of Representatives
Preceded by Madison R. Smith	Member of the U.S. House of Representatives from Missouri's 13th congressional district 1909–1911	Succeeded by Walter L. Hensley
