= Frank M. Karsten =

American politician (1913–1992)

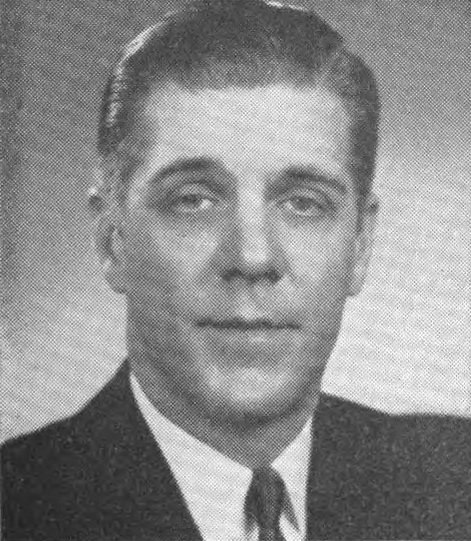

Member of the U.S. House of Representatives from Missouri
- In office January 3, 1947 – January 3, 1969
- Preceded by: John J. Cochran
- Succeeded by: Bill Clay
- Constituency: 13th district (1947–1953); 1st district (1953–1969)

Personal details
- Born: January 7, 1913 San Antonio, Texas U.S.
- Died: May 14, 1992 (aged 79) San Antonio, Texas U.S.
- Party: Democratic

Frank Melvin Karsten (January 7, 1913 – May 14, 1992) was a Democratic United States Representative from Missouri.

== Biography ==
Frank M. Karsten was born in San Antonio, Texas on January 7, 1913. His family moved to St. Louis, Missouri in 1925, and he graduated from Beaumont High School. Karsten was a staff assistant for Congressman John J. Cochran from 1934 to 1946. He attended National University (now George Washington University Law School) while working for Cochran, and graduated with an LL.B. in 1940.

Karsten ran to succeed Cochran in what was then the 13th district in downtown and north St. Louis in 1946, when Cochran withdrew on suffering a stroke the day after he filed for reelection. He won with 54 percent of the vote. However, he would never face another contest nearly that close, and was reelected 10 times. Indeed, the 1946 contest is the last time the Republicans put up a reasonably well-financed candidate in the district, which was renumbered as the 1st in 1952.

At a 1950 Congressional hearing, Karsten claimed he had seen a flying saucer. Karsten did not sign the 1956 Southern Manifesto, and voted in favor of the Civil Rights Acts of 1957, 1960, 1964, and 1968, as well as the 24th Amendment to the U.S. Constitution and the Voting Rights Act of 1965. During his time in the House, Karsten served as an assistant Democratic whip and rose to become a senior member of the Ways and Means Committee. He was a delegate to the conference for the General Agreement on Trade and Tariffs in Geneva, Switzerland in 1957, and a delegate to the British-American Parliamentary Conference from 1964 to 1965.

In 1968 Karsten faced his third redistricting in four elections. The new map, enacted in August 1967 and allowed to apply in 1968 despite its violation of court guidelines, placed most of St. Louis’ black citizens in Karsten’s district. Karsten had won nomination with no less than three-quarters of the vote, and had never won less than 64% of the vote since 1948; Nonetheless, on paper the new map left him vulnerable to a primary challenge from an African-American Democrat. Despite his staunch support of civil rights, Karsten apparently read the writing on the wall and did not run for a 12th term. This proved prescient, as he was succeeded by African-American Democrat Bill Clay. Karsten practiced law after leaving Congress, and in 1969 he received the honorary degree of LL.D. from Parsons College in Fairfield, Iowa.

Karsten’s family moved from San Antonio to St. Louis when he was twelve, but he worked in Washington from his teen years, apparently as a congressional page, then a staffer, then a representative, then a lobbyist. When he retired he did so to San Antonio, where he died on May 14, 1992, and was interred in Mission Burial Park South.

U.S. House of Representatives
Preceded by John J. Cochran	Member of the U.S. House of Representatives from Missouri's 13th congressional district 1947–1953	Succeeded by District eliminated
Preceded by Clare Magee	Member of the U.S. House of Representatives from Missouri's 1st congressional district 1953–1969	Succeeded by Bill Clay
