= Missouri's 13th congressional district =

Former U.S. House district

- Obsolete district
- Created: 1870; 1935
- Eliminated: 1930; 1950
- Years active: 1873-1933; 1935-1953

The 13th congressional district of Missouri was a congressional district for the United States House of Representatives in Missouri from 1873 to 1953.

== List of members representing the district ==
| Member | Party | Years | Cong ress | Electoral history |
|---|---|---|---|---|
District created March 4, 1873
| Aylett H. Buckner (Mexico) | Democratic | March 4, 1873 – March 3, 1883 | 43rd 44th 45th 46th 47th | Elected in 1872. Re-elected in 1874. Re-elected in 1876. Re-elected in 1878. Re-elected in 1880. Redistricted to the 7th district. |
| Robert W. Fyan (Marshfield) | Democratic | March 4, 1883 – March 3, 1885 | 48th | Elected in 1882. Lost re-election. |
| William H. Wade (Springfield) | Republican | March 4, 1885 – March 3, 1891 | 49th 50th 51st | Elected in 1884. Re-elected in 1886. Re-elected in 1888. Lost re-election. |
| Robert W. Fyan (Marshfield) | Democratic | March 4, 1891 – March 3, 1895 | 52nd 53rd | Elected in 1890. Re-elected in 1892. Retired. |
| John H. Raney (Piedmont) | Republican | March 4, 1895 – March 3, 1897 | 54th | Elected in 1894. Lost re-election. |
| Edward Robb (Perryville) | Democratic | March 4, 1897 – March 3, 1905 | 55th 56th 57th 58th | Elected in 1896. Re-elected in 1898. Re-elected in 1900. Re-elected in 1902. Lost re-election. |
| Marion E. Rhodes (Potosi) | Republican | March 4, 1905 – March 3, 1907 | 59th | Elected in 1904. Lost re-election. |
| Madison R. Smith (Farmington) | Democratic | March 4, 1907 – March 3, 1909 | 60th | Elected in 1906. Lost re-election. |
| Politte Elvins (Elvins) | Republican | March 4, 1909 – March 3, 1911 | 61st | Elected in 1908. Lost re-election. |
| Walter L. Hensley (Farmington) | Democratic | March 4, 1911 – March 3, 1919 | 62nd 63rd 64th 65th | Elected in 1910. Re-elected in 1912. Re-elected in 1914. Re-elected in 1916. Retired. |
| Marion E. Rhodes (Potosi) | Republican | March 4, 1919 – March 3, 1923 | 66th 67th | Elected in 1918. Re-elected in 1920. Lost re-election. |
| J. Scott Wolff (Festus) | Democratic | March 4, 1923 – March 3, 1925 | 68th | Elected in 1922. Lost re-election. |
| Charles E. Kiefner (Perryville) | Republican | March 4, 1925 – March 3, 1927 | 69th | Elected in 1924. Lost re-election. |
| Clyde Williams (Hillsboro) | Democratic | March 4, 1927 – March 3, 1929 | 70th | Elected in 1926. Lost re-election. |
| Charles E. Kiefner (Perryville) | Republican | March 4, 1929 – March 3, 1931 | 71st | Elected in 1928. Lost re-election. |
| Clyde Williams (Hillsboro) | Democratic | March 4, 1931 – March 3, 1933 | 72nd | Elected in 1930. Redistricted to the at-large district. |
| District inactive | | March 4, 1933 – January 3, 1935 | 73rd | All representatives elected at-large on a general ticket |
| John J. Cochran (St. Louis) | Democratic | January 3, 1935 – January 3, 1947 | 74th 75th 76th 77th 78th 79th | Redistricted from the at-large district and re-elected in 1934. Re-elected in 1936. Re-elected in 1938. Re-elected in 1940. Re-elected in 1942. Re-elected in 1944. Retired. |
| Frank M. Karsten (St. Louis) | Democratic | January 3, 1947 – January 3, 1953 | 80th 81st 82nd | Elected in 1946. Re-elected in 1948. Re-elected in 1950. Redistricted to the 1st district. |
District eliminated January 3, 1953
