= Thomas L. Anderson =

American politician (1808–1885)

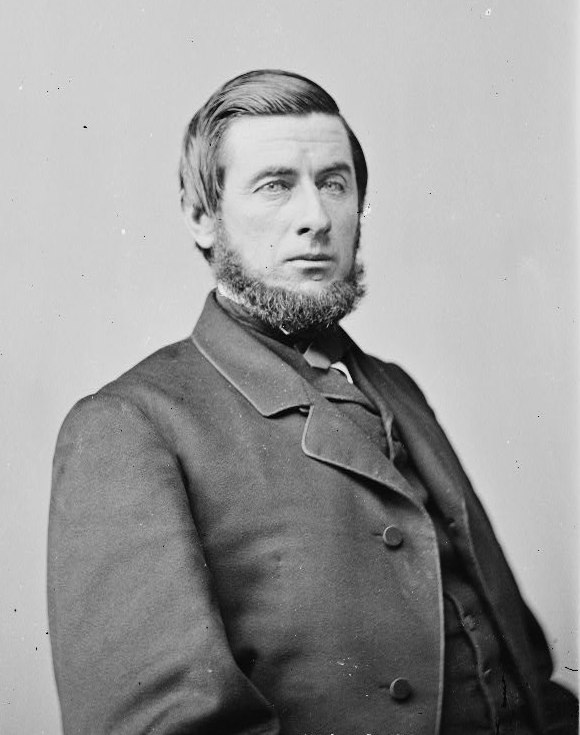

Member of the U.S. House of Representatives from Missouri's 2nd district
- In office March 4, 1857 – March 3, 1861
- Preceded by: Gilchrist Porter
- Succeeded by: James S. Rollins

Personal details
- Born: Thomas Lilbourne Anderson; December 8, 1808 Bowling Green, Kentucky, U.S.
- Died: March 6, 1885 (aged 76) Palmyra, Missouri, U.S.
- Party: American Party (Know-Nothing); Independent Democrat

Thomas Lilbourne Anderson (December 8, 1808 – March 6, 1885) was a slave owner and practicing lawyer who served in the United States House of Representatives from Missouri for two terms from 1857 to 1861.

== Biography ==
He was born in Bowling Green, Kentucky, and was admitted to the Kentucky bar in 1828. He began the practice of law in Franklin, Kentucky, later moving to Palmyra, Missouri, in 1830.

=== Political career ===
He was elected to the Missouri House of Representatives in 1840, and remained a member of that body through 1844. He served as a member of the Missouri Constitutional Convention of 1845. On December 24, 1853, he condemned mass escapes of enslaved people citing the high cost to slaveowners.

=== Congress ===
He was first elected to the United States Congress in 1857 as a member of the American Party (Know-Nothing), winning reelection in 1859 as an Independent Democrat. He also served as a presidential elector for the Whig Party in 1844, 1848, 1852, and 1856.

=== Death and burial ===
He died in Palmyra, Missouri in 1885, aged 76, and was interred in the City Cemetery.

== Sources ==
- Who Was Who in America, Historical Volume 1607-1896. Chicago: Marquis Who's Who, 1967.
- United States Congress. "Thomas L. Anderson (id: A000234)". Biographical Directory of the United States Congress.

U.S. House of Representatives
Preceded by Gilchrist Porter	Member of the U.S. House of Representatives from Missouri's 2nd congressional district 1857–1861	Succeeded by James Sidney Rollins
