= Marion E. Rhodes =

American politician (1868–1928)

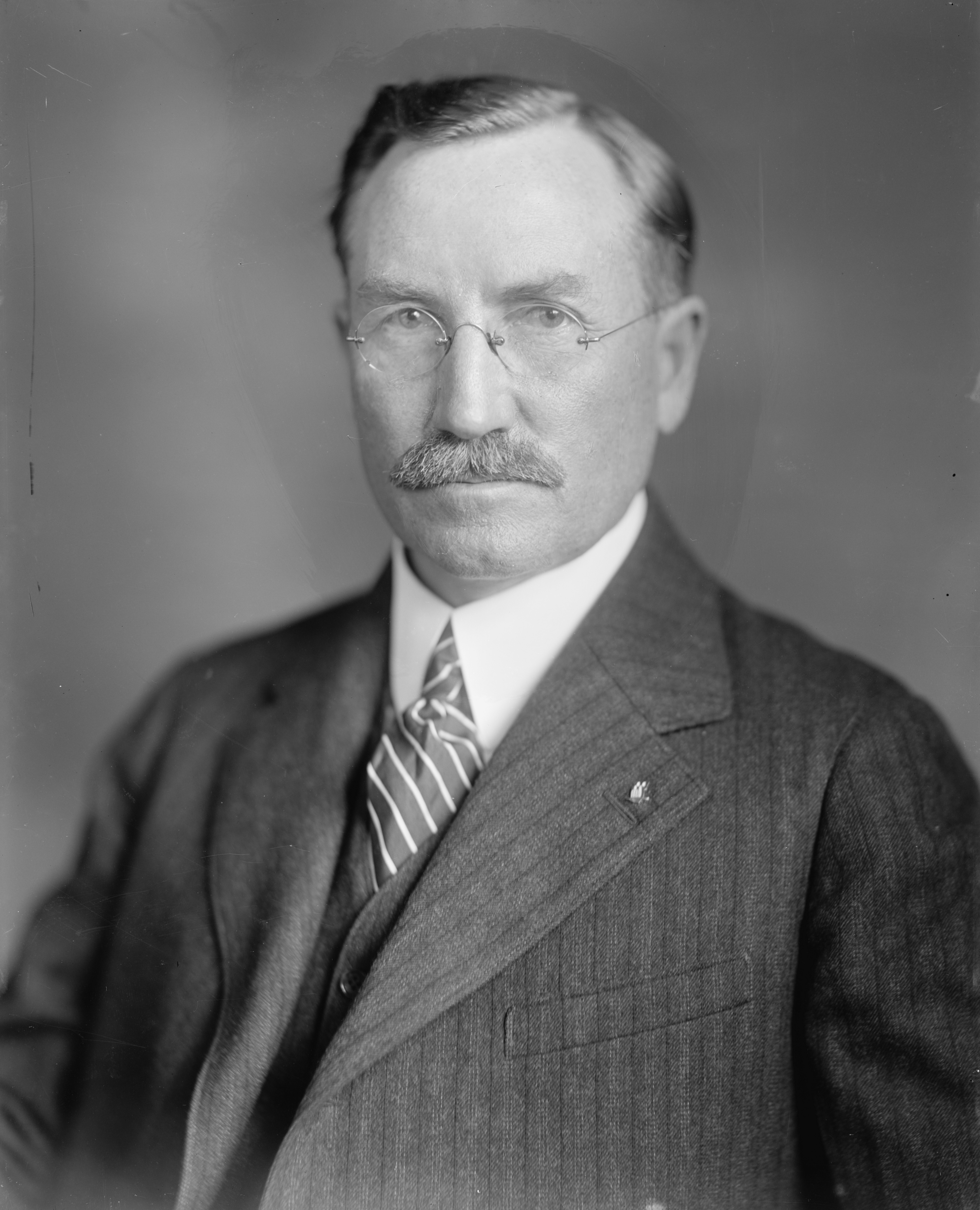

Member of the U.S. House of Representatives from Missouri's 13th district
- In office March 4, 1919 – March 3, 1923
- Preceded by: Walter L. Hensley
- Succeeded by: J. Scott Wolff
- In office March 4, 1905 – March 3, 1907
- Preceded by: Edward Robb
- Succeeded by: Madison R. Smith

Personal details
- Born: January 4, 1868 near Glen Allen, Missouri, U.S.
- Died: December 25, 1928 (aged 60) Washington, D.C., U.S.
- Party: Republican

Marion Edwards Rhodes (January 4, 1868 – December 25, 1928) was a U.S. representative from Missouri's 13th congressional district.

Born on a farm near Glen Allen, Missouri, Rhodes attended the public schools and Will Mayfield College. He was graduated from the State normal school at Cape Girardeau, Missouri, in 1891 and from Stansbury College in 1893. He taught school. He studied law. He was admitted to the bar in 1896 and commenced practice in Potosi, Washington County, Missouri, in 1898. He served as delegate to all Republican State conventions from 1896 to 1920. He served as prosecuting attorney of Washington County 1900–1904.

Rhodes was elected as a Republican to the Fifty-ninth Congress (March 4, 1905 – March 3, 1907). He was an unsuccessful candidate for reelection in 1906 to the Sixtieth Congress. He served as mayor of Potosi in 1908 and 1909. He served as member of the State house of representatives 1908–1910. He served as a delegate to the 1908 Republican National Convention. He served as member of the Missouri State Board of Law Examiners 1912–1914.

Rhodes was elected to the Sixty-sixth and Sixty-seventh Congresses (March 4, 1919 – March 3, 1923). He served as chairman of the Committee on Mines and Mining (Sixty-seventh Congress). He was an unsuccessful candidate for reelection in 1922 to the Sixty-eighth Congress. He was appointed assistant to the Comptroller General of the United States in Washington, D.C., and served from April 1, 1923, until his death in that city, December 25, 1928. He was interred in the Masonic Cemetery, Potosi, Missouri.

U.S. House of Representatives
Preceded by Edward Robb	Member of the U.S. House of Representatives from Missouri's 13th congressional district 1905–1907	Succeeded by Madison R. Smith
Preceded by Walter L. Hensley	Member of the U.S. House of Representatives from Missouri's 13th congressional district 1919–1923	Succeeded by J. Scott Wolff
