= Robert W. Fyan =

American politician (1835–1896)

Robert Washington Fyan
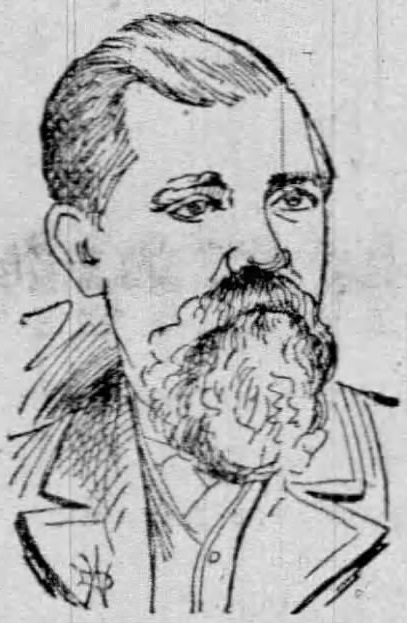
- St. Louis Daily Globe-Democrat, November 6, 1890

Member of the U.S. House of Representatives from Missouri's 13th district
- In office March 4, 1883 – March 3, 1885
- Preceded by: Aylett H. Buckner
- Succeeded by: William H. Wade
- In office March 4, 1891 – March 3, 1895
- Preceded by: William H. Wade
- Succeeded by: John H. Raney

Personal details
- Born: March 11, 1835 Bedford Springs, Pennsylvania, U.S.
- Died: July 28, 1896 (aged 61) Marshfield, Missouri, U.S.
- Resting place: Lebanon Cemetery, Lebanon, Missouri, U.S.
- Party: Democratic

Robert Washington Fyan (March 11, 1835 – July 28, 1896) was a U.S. representative and soldier from Missouri.

Born in Bedford Springs, Pennsylvania, Fyan attended the common schools. He studied law and was admitted to the bar in 1858; commencing practice in Marshfield, Missouri. He became the County attorney in 1859. In June 1861 he entered the Union Army to fight in the American Civil War. He served in Colonel Hampton's regiment, the Webster County Home Guards, the 24th Missouri Infantry and the 46th Missouri Infantry regiments. After the war in 1865 and 1866 he served as Circuit attorney and afterwards as Circuit judge of the 14th judicial circuit of Missouri from April 1866 to January 1883.

In 1870 he lived in Lebanon, Missouri. He served as a member of the State constitutional convention in 1875. Fyan moved to Webster County, Missouri before 1880. Robert Fyan was married to Elizabeth ‘Lizzie’ P. Hyer of Dent County, Missouri who died in the cyclone/tornado that struck Marshfield, Missouri on April 18, 1880.

Robert Fyan was the Judge in Laclede County, Missouri who presided over the first legal hanging in Laclede County. The case was the 'State of Missouri' vs. Joseph Core. The trial started August 4, 1879. Robert Fyan sentenced Joseph Core as follows: 'he was to be taken to the place of execution and there be hanged by the neck until he be dead.' Joseph Core was convicted for murdering George E. King.

Fyan was elected as a Democrat to the Forty-eighth Congress (March 4, 1883 – March 3, 1885). He subsequently was elected to the Fifty-second and Fifty-third Congresses (March 4, 1891 – March 3, 1895) and afterwards resumed the practice of law. He died in Marshfield, Missouri, on July 28, 1896, and was interred in Lebanon Cemetery, Lebanon, Missouri.

U.S. House of Representatives
Preceded by Aylett H. Buckner	Member of the U.S. House of Representatives from Missouri's 13th congressional district 1883-1885	Succeeded by William H. Wade
Preceded by William H. Wade	Member of the U.S. House of Representatives from Missouri's 13th congressional district 1891-1895	Succeeded by John H. Raney
