= Robert D. Johnson =

American politician

Robert Davis Johnson
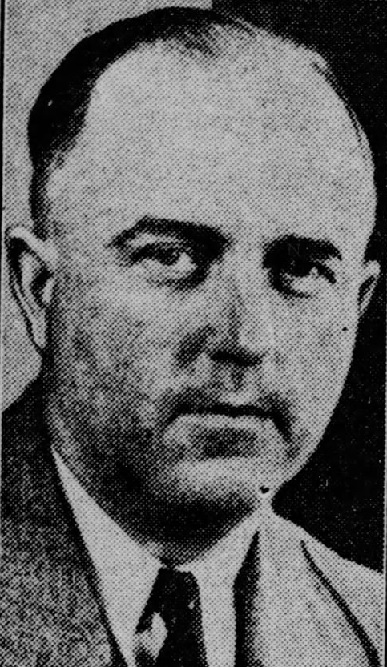

Member of the U.S. House of Representatives from Missouri's 7th district
- In office September 29, 1931 – March 3, 1933
- Preceded by: Samuel C. Major
- Succeeded by: Dewey Short

Personal details
- Born: August 12, 1883 near Slater, Missouri, US
- Died: October 23, 1961 (aged 78) Marshall, Missouri, US
- Party: Democratic
- Profession: lawyer

Robert Davis Johnson (August 12, 1883 – October 23, 1961) was a U.S. representative from Missouri.

Born on a farm near Slater, Missouri, Johnson was educated in the rural graded schools of his native county and graduated from the Portland (Indiana) High School in 1901. He attended the Missouri Valley College, Marshall, Missouri. He taught school in Saline Valley and Orearville, Missouri from 1901 to 1907. He served as clerk of the circuit court of Saline County in 1915–1923. While serving as clerk, he also studied law. He was admitted to the bar in 1917 and commenced practice in Marshall, Missouri, in 1923. He served as prosecuting attorney of Saline County in 1925–1928.

Johnson was elected as a Democrat to the Seventy-second Congress to fill the vacancy caused by the death of Samuel C. Major and served from September 29, 1931, to March 3, 1933. He was an unsuccessful candidate for renomination in 1932. He resumed the practice of law in Marshall, Missouri.

Johnson was elected judge of the circuit court and of the 15th Judicial Circuit of Missouri on November 5, 1940, and served until January 1, 1947.

He again resumed the practice of law in Marshall, Missouri, where he died October 23, 1961. He was interred in Ridge Park Cemetery.

U.S. House of Representatives
Preceded by Samuel C. Major	Member of the U.S. House of Representatives from Missouri's 7th congressional district 1931–1933	Succeeded by Dewey Short
