= Ralph E. Bailey =

American politician (1878–1948)

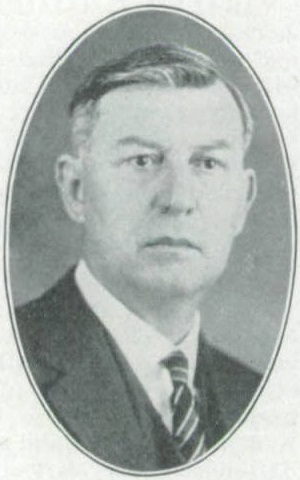
- From 1924's Official Manual of the State of Missouri 1925-1926

Member of the U.S. House of Representatives from Missouri's 14th district
- In office March 4, 1925 – March 3, 1927
- Preceded by: James F. Fulbright
- Succeeded by: James F. Fulbright

Personal details
- Born: Ralph Emerson Bailey; July 14, 1878 Cainsville, Missouri, U.S.
- Died: April 8, 1948 (aged 69) Cape Girardeau, Missouri
- Resting place: City Cemetery, Sikeston, Missouri
- Party: Republican

Ralph Emerson Bailey (July 14, 1878 – April 8, 1948) was an American lawyer and politician who served one term as a U.S. representative from Missouri from 1925 to 1927.

== Biography ==
Born in Cainsville, Missouri, Bailey moved to Illinois with his parents, who settled in Benton, Franklin County, in 1880. He attended the graded and high schools at Benton. He moved to Bloomfield, Missouri, in 1897. He graduated from the Southeast Missouri Teachers' College (now Southeast Missouri State University) at Cape Girardeau in 1901. He soon took a special course at the University of Missouri. He studied law.

=== Early career ===
He was admitted to the bar in 1907 and commenced practice in Bloomfield, Missouri. He moved to Sikeston, Missouri in 1910 and continued the practice of law. He served as City attorney in 1912–1914 and again in 1918–1922. He served as a member of the board of regents of the Southeast Missouri Teachers' College.

=== Congress ===
Bailey was elected as a Republican to the Sixty-ninth Congress (March 4, 1925 – March 3, 1927). He was not a candidate for renomination in 1926 to the Seventieth Congress.

=== Later career and death ===
He resumed the practice of law in Sikeston, Missouri.

He died in Cape Girardeau, Missouri, April 8, 1948. He was interred in the City Cemetery, Sikeston, Missouri.

U.S. House of Representatives
Preceded by James F. Fulbright	Member of the U.S. House of Representatives from Missouri's 14th congressional district 1925–1927	Succeeded by James F. Fulbright
