= Madison R. Smith =

American politician

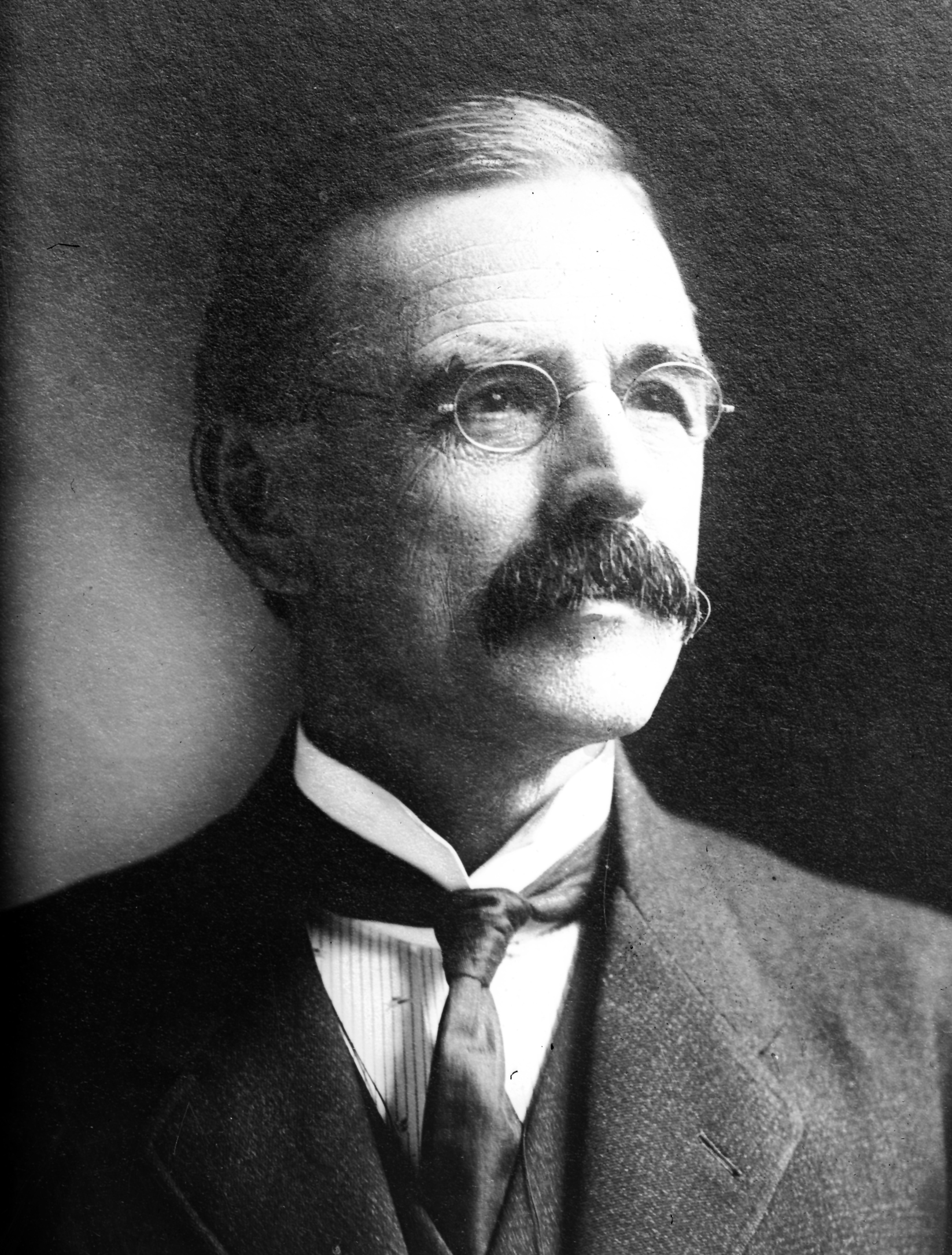
Madison Roswell Smith

Madison Roswell Smith (July 9, 1850 – June 18, 1919) was a United States representative from Missouri.

== Biography ==
Born on a farm near Glenallen, Missouri, Smith attended public schools and Central College in Fayette, Missouri. He taught school and studied law, being admitted to the bar in 1874. He began the practice of law at Marble Hill, Missouri, in 1877 and served as the prosecuting attorney of Bollinger County from 1878 to 1882.

He served in the state Senate from 1884 to 1888. He declined to be a candidate for re-election.

He served as editor of reports for the St. Louis court of appeals for four years and resigned. He served as delegate to the Democratic National Conventions in 1896 and 1912.

Smith was elected as a Democrat to the Sixtieth Congress (March 4, 1907 – March 3, 1909). He was an unsuccessful candidate for re-election in 1908 to the Sixty-first Congress.

He organized and served as secretary of the Federal Trust Co. of St. Louis from 1909 to 1912. He was the U.S. Minister to Haiti from 1912 until his resignation in 1914.

After his return to the US, he returned to the practice of law in Farmington, Missouri. He died there on June 18, 1919, and was interred in the Masonic Cemetery. In 2011 Smith's tombstone was desecrated. Police continue to investigate this act as an unsolved crime as of 2017.

U.S. House of Representatives
Preceded by Marion E. Rhodes	Member of the U.S. House of Representatives from Missouri's 13th congressional district 1907-1909	Succeeded by Politte Elvins
