= John W. Palmer =

American politician

John William Palmer
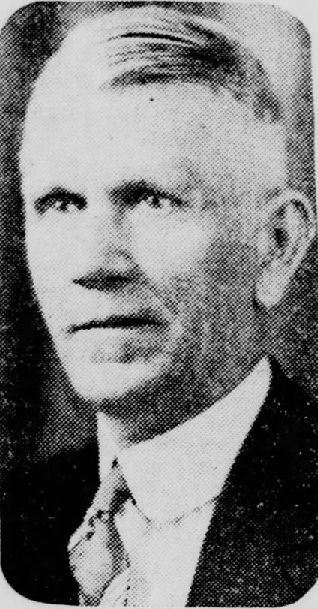

Member of the U.S. House of Representatives from Missouri's 7th district
- In office March 4, 1929 – March 3, 1931
- Preceded by: Samuel C. Major
- Succeeded by: Samuel C. Major

Personal details
- Born: August 20, 1866 near Macks Creek, Missouri, US
- Died: November 3, 1958 (aged 92) Sedalia, Missouri, US
- Party: Republican
- Profession: lawyer

John William Palmer (August 20, 1866 – November 3, 1958) was a U.S. representative from Missouri.

Born on a farm near Macks Creek, Missouri, Palmer attended the local schools. He taught school in Hickory County, Missouri. He engaged in the drug business at Cross Timbers, Missouri, in 1888 and in the general merchandise business at Climax Springs, Missouri from 1891 to 1909. He attended the University Medical College at Kansas City, Missouri, in 1894 and 1895. Practiced medicine in Climax Springs in 1895–1908. He attended the law school of Lincoln-Jefferson University, Hammond, Indiana, in 1896. He was admitted to the bar in 1897 and commenced the practice of law in Climax Springs, Missouri. He served as representative in the Fortieth and Forty-first General Assemblies of Missouri in 1898–1902. He moved to Linn Creek, Missouri, in 1909. He served as prosecuting attorney of Camden County in 1909–1915. He moved to Sedalia, Missouri, in 1915 and continued the practice of law. He was an unsuccessful candidate for State senator in 1904.

Palmer was elected as a Republican to the Seventy-first Congress (March 4, 1929 – March 3, 1931). He was an unsuccessful candidate for reelection in 1930 to the Seventy-second Congress, for election in 1931 to fill a vacancy in the Seventy-second Congress, and for election in 1932 to the Seventy-third Congress. He resumed the practice of law. He died in Sedalia, Missouri, November 3, 1958. He was interred in Crown Hill Cemetery.

U.S. House of Representatives
Preceded by Samuel C. Major	Member of the U.S. House of Representatives from Missouri's 7th congressional district 1929–1931	Succeeded by Samuel C. Major
