= Edward D. Hays =

American politician (1872–1941)

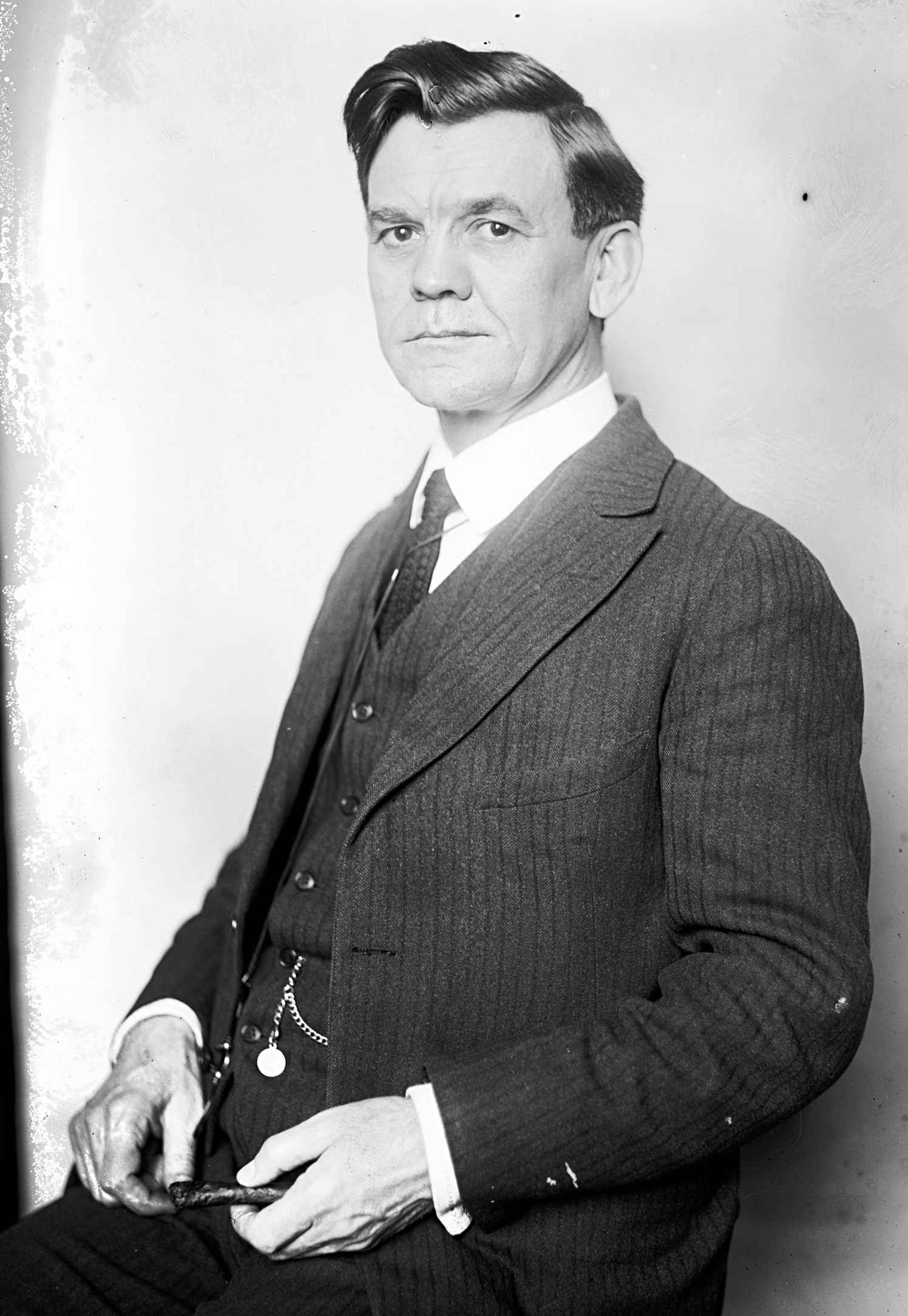

Member of the U.S. House of Representatives from Missouri's 14th district
- In office March 4, 1919 – March 3, 1923
- Preceded by: Joseph J. Russell
- Succeeded by: James F. Fulbright

Personal details
- Born: April 28, 1872 near Oak Ridge, Missouri, U.S.
- Died: July 25, 1941 (aged 69) Bethesda, Maryland, U.S.
- Party: Republican

Edward Dixon Hays (April 28, 1872 – July 25, 1941) was a U.S. representative from Jackson, Missouri. He was later a key staff member with the U.S. Department of Justice. Prior to his election to congress he had lived his whole life in Cape Girardeau County, Missouri.

Hays was born on a farm near Oak Ridge, Missouri (in Cape Girardeau County) to John W. and Mary Jane (Horn) Hays. He attended public schools. His parents were natives of Pennsylvania. Hays graduated from the Oak Ridge High School in 1889 and from the Cape Girardeau State Normal School (now Southeast Missouri State University) in 1893.

After his graduation from Cape Girardeau State Normal School he became a school teacher. He was so employed for two years, leaving that profession in 1895. He at that time moved to Jackson, Missouri (the county seat of Cape Girardeau County). There he studied law in the office of an established lawyer. He was admitted to the Missouri bar in 1896 and commenced practice, still working in Jackson, Missouri. He would continue doing this for several decades.

Hays served as Mayor of Jackson from 1903 to 1907. In the last year he was elected Probate Judge of Cape Girardeau County, which Jackson is part of. He served in that position from 1907 to 1918.

He moved to Cape Girardeau, Missouri, in 1915 and continued to practice law. He was elected Republican Congressman to the Sixty-sixth and Sixty-seventh United States Congress (March 4, 1919 – March 3, 1923). He was an unsuccessful candidate for reelection in 1923 to the Sixty-eighth Congress. He was admitted to the District of Columbia Bar and appointed trial lawyer.

He argued cases before the United States Supreme Court as Special Prosecutor for the Attorney General of the United States, first for the Justice Department (1923–1925), then for the Interstate Commerce Commission (1925–1933). In 1934, he continued to practice law in Washington, D.C., while residing in Bethesda, Maryland, where he died on July 25, 1941. He was interred in Cedar Hill Cemetery, Washington, D.C. His New York Times obituary describes him as having been "assistant attorney general".

U.S. House of Representatives
Preceded by Joseph J. Russell	Member of the U.S. House of Representatives from Missouri's 14th congressional district 1919–1923	Succeeded by James F. Fulbright
