= Edward Robb =

American politician (1857–1934)

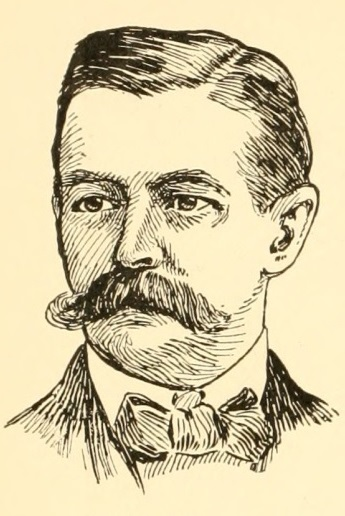
- From 1902's Around the Capital with Uncle Hank

Member of the U.S. House of Representatives from Missouri's 13th district
- In office March 4, 1897 – March 3, 1905
- Preceded by: John H. Raney
- Succeeded by: Marion E. Rhodes

Member of the Missouri House of Representatives
- In office 1884–1886

Personal details
- Born: March 19, 1857 Brazeau, Missouri, U.S.
- Died: March 13, 1934 (aged 76) Perryville, Missouri, U.S.
- Resting place: Home Cemetery
- Party: Democratic
- Education: University of Missouri
- Occupation: Politician, attorney

Edward Robb (March 19, 1857 – March 13, 1934) was a U.S. representative from Missouri.

Born in Brazeau, Missouri, Robb attended the common schools, Brazeau (Missouri) Academy, Fruitland (Missouri) Normal Institute, and the University of Missouri in Columbia. He was graduated from the law department of the University of Missouri in March 1879. He was admitted to the bar in 1879 and commenced practice in Perryville.

Robb was elected prosecuting attorney of Perry County in 1880 and reelected in 1882. He served as member of the State house of representatives in 1884–1886. He served as assistant attorney general of the State in 1889–1893.

Robb was elected as a Democrat to the Fifty-fifth and to the three succeeding Congresses (March 4, 1897 – March 3, 1905). He was an unsuccessful candidate for reelection in 1904 to the Fifty-ninth Congress. He served as delegate to the Democratic National Convention in 1908. He resumed the practice of law until his death in Perryville, Missouri, March 13, 1934. He was interred in Home Cemetery.

U.S. House of Representatives
Preceded by John H. Raney	Member of the U.S. House of Representatives from Missouri's 13th congressional district 1897-1905	Succeeded by Marion E. Rhodes
