= William H. Wade =

American politician (1835–1911)

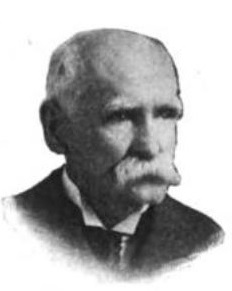
- From 1905's Official Manual of the State of Missouri

Member of the U.S. House of Representatives from Missouri's 13th district
- In office March 4, 1885 – March 3, 1891
- Preceded by: Robert W. Fyan
- Succeeded by: Robert W. Fyan

Personal details
- Born: November 3, 1835 Springfield, Ohio, U.S.
- Died: January 13, 1911 (aged 75) Springfield, Missouri, U.S.
- Party: Republican
- Education: Antioch College
- Occupation: Politician

William Henry Wade (November 3, 1835 – January 13, 1911) was an American politician. He was a soldier in the Union Army and a U.S. Representative from Missouri.

== Early life ==
Wade was born near Springfield, in Clark County, Ohio on November 3, 1835. He attended the common schools, Grove Academy.

Wade attended Antioch College in Yellow Springs, Ohio.

== Career ==
Wade was a farmer. He engaged in agricultural pursuits.

On April 17, 1861, during the Civil War, Wade enlisted in the Union Army. Wade was mustered out on April 26, 1866 with the rank of lieutenant colonel. He served with Thirty-First Ohio Volunteers. He commanded the 40th United States Colored Infantry Regiment and fought in Corinth, Murfreesboro, and Chickamauga.

In May 1866, Wade moved to Missouri and resumed agricultural pursuits.

In 1881, Wade served as member of the State house of representatives until 1884.

Wade was elected as a Republican to the Forty-ninth, Fiftieth, and Fifty-first Congresses (March 4, 1885 – March 3, 1891). He served as chairman of the Committee on Labor (Fifty-first Congress). He was an unsuccessful candidate for reelection to the Fifty-second Congress. He again engaged in agricultural pursuits.

== Death ==
Wade died in Springfield, Missouri on January 13, 1911.

U.S. House of Representatives
Preceded by Robert W. Fyan	Member of the U.S. House of Representatives from Missouri's 13th congressional district 1885–1891	Succeeded by Robert W. Fyan
