= Bill Clay =

American politician (1931–2025)

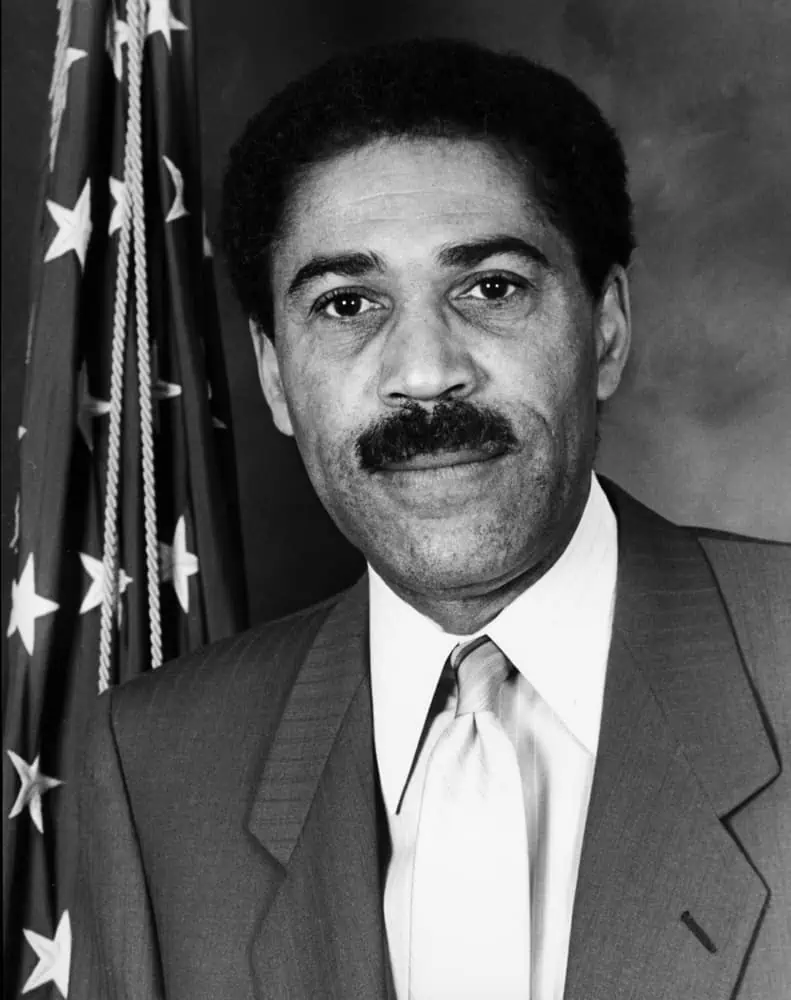
- Official portrait, c. 1980s

Member of the U.S. House of Representatives from Missouri's 1st district
- In office January 3, 1969 – January 3, 2001
- Preceded by: Frank M. Karsten
- Succeeded by: Lacy Clay

Personal details
- Born: William Lacy Clay; April 30, 1931 St. Louis, Missouri, U.S.
- Died: c. July 16, 2025 (aged 94) (Note: Sources differed on whether Clay died on July 16 or 17.) Adelphi, Maryland, U.S.
- Resting place: Arlington National Cemetery
- Party: Democratic
- Spouse: Carol Ann Johnson (m. 1953; died 2025)
- Children: 3, including Lacy
- Education: Saint Louis University (BS)

Military service
- Allegiance: United States
- Branch/service: United States Army
- Years of service: 1953–1955

William Lacy Clay Sr. (April 30, 1931 – c. July 16, 2025) was an American politician from Missouri who served as the first African American member of the United States House of Representatives representing Missouri's 1st congressional district containing portions of St. Louis for 32 years from 1969 to 2001. He was a member of the Democratic Party and one of the 13 co-founding members of the Congressional Black Caucus, and was also acknowledged for having proposed transforming the group into a formal nonpartisan congressional caucus.

== Early life and career ==
Clay was born in St. Louis on April 30, 1931, the son of Luella S. (Hyatt) and Irving Charles Clay. He graduated from Saint Louis University in 1953. Clay served in the United States Army from 1953 to 1955, and was a St. Louis alderman from 1959 to 1964. Clay served 105 days in jail for participating in the Jefferson Bank and Trust Co. civil and political rights demonstration in 1963. Clay organized, and was among those who led, this protest as well. Prior to entering the United States Congress, Clay was a real estate agent and later worked as a labor coordinator. He worked for a union of city employees in St. Louis from 1961 to 1964 and then a local steamfitters union until 1967.

== Personal life ==
Clay married Carol Ann Johnson in 1953. They had three children, including Lacy Clay, who would be elected in 2000 to succeed his father in the U.S. House of Representatives. The Clay family were parishioners at the predominantly black St. Nicholas Catholic Church in St. Louis. On February 16, 2025, Carol died at the age of 89.

Clay died in July 2025 at the age of 94, at the home of his daughter Vicki Jackson in Adelphi, Maryland. He was buried in Section 36 of Arlington National Cemetery on October 21, 2025.

== Political career ==
Clay was elected to the United States House of Representatives in 1968. Along with fellow African American lawmakers such as former Reps. Shirley Chisholm (D-NY) and Louis Stokes (D-OH), Clay was one of three newcomer members of Congress in 1969 who helped co-found the Black Congressional Caucus predecessor group the "Democratic Select Committee" at the behest of Charles Diggs (D-MI). During a meeting between caucus members on February 2, 1971, Clay would help lay the foundation for the creation of the Congressional Black Caucus when he proposed transforming the Democratic Select Committee into a formal nonpartisan caucus for African-American U.S. Congress members. He became an advocate for environmentalism, labor issues, and social justice. Clay voted for the Family and Medical Leave Act of 1993. From 1991 until the Democrats lost control of Congress in 1995, Clay chaired the House Committee on the Post Office and Civil Service. In 2000, he announced his retirement from the House, and his son, Lacy, succeeded him.

== Honors ==
In 1996, the William L. Clay Center for Molecular Electronics (now the Center for Nanoscience) was dedicated in his honor on the campus of the University of Missouri–St. Louis.

Clay was also the founder of the William L. Clay Scholarship and Research Fund, which awards college scholarships to high-school seniors living in Missouri's 1st congressional district. The fund, which is a 501(c)3 organization, has awarded scholarships since 1985.

The Poplar Street Bridge, which connects St. Louis, Missouri, and the town of East St. Louis, Illinois, was renamed Congressman William L. Clay Bridge on October 7, 2013.

William L. Clay has a star and biographical plaque on the St. Louis Walk of Fame.

== Works ==
Clay wrote several works of non-fiction.

- To Kill or Not to Kill: Thoughts on Capital Punishment (1990) ISBN 0-89370-331-1
- Just Permanent Interests: Black Americans in Congress, 1870–1991 (1992) ISBN 1-56743-000-7
- Racism in the White House: A Common Practice of Most United States Presidents (2002) ISBN 0-88258-206-2
- Bill Clay: A Political Voice at the Grass Roots (2004) ISBN 1-883982-52-9 Designed by Steve Hartman of Creativille, Inc. Creativille, Inc. - Be Simple. Be Passionate. Be Creative.
- The Jefferson Bank Confrontation (2008) ISBN 0-944514-34-0

== See also ==
- List of African-American United States representatives

== Notes ==
U.S. House of Representatives
Preceded by Frank M. Karsten	Member of the U.S. House of Representatives from Missouri's 1st congressional district 1969–2001	Succeeded by Lacy Clay
Preceded by William D. Ford	Chair of the House Civil Service Committee; 1991–1995	Succeeded by William Clinger as Chair of the House Oversight Committee
Preceded by Bill Goodling	Ranking Member of the House Education Committee; 1995–2001	Succeeded by George Miller
