= J. Scott Wolff =

American politician

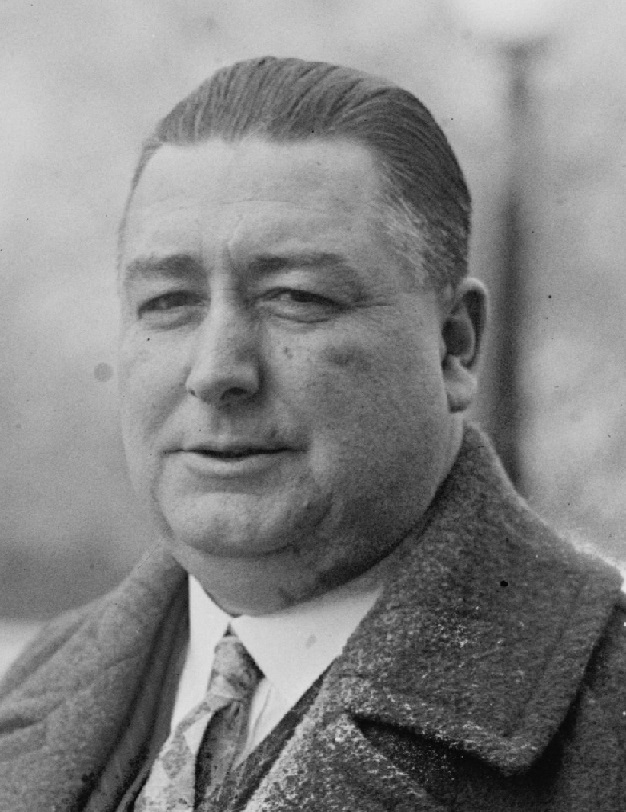
- Wolff in February 1924

Member of the 68th United States Congress
- In office March 4, 1923 - March 3, 1925

Member of the Missouri House of Representatives
- In office 1913-1915

Mayor of Festus, Missouri
- In office 1907-1911; 1915-1917

Personal details
- Born: June 14, 1878 Westmoreland County, Pennsylvania, USA
- Died: February 27, 1958 (aged 79) Kansas City, Missouri, USA
- Party: Democratic Party
- Education: Washington University in St. Louis

Joseph Scott Wolff (June 14, 1878 – February 27, 1958) was a U.S. representative from Missouri.

== Biography ==
Wolff was born on a farm in Westmoreland County near Greensburg, Pennsylvania. He served with the 4th Cavalry Regiment in the Philippines during the Spanish–American War. He moved to St. Louis, Missouri in 1901, graduating from Washington University School of Dental Medicine in 1905. He practiced dentistry in St. Louis and Festus. He served as the mayor of Festus from 1907 to 1911 and again from 1915 to 1917.

He was elected to the Missouri House of Representatives in 1913 and served for two years. In 1923, he graduated from the St. Louis College of Law and Finance and was subsequently admitted to the bar. He served on the 68th United States Congress from 1923 to 1925, losing his 1924 reelection campaign. He moved to Kansas City in 1924, where he practiced both dentistry and law until retiring in 1957. He died the following year on February 27 and is interred at Gambel Cemetery in Festus.

U.S. House of Representatives
Preceded by Marion E. Rhodes	Member of the U.S. House of Representatives from Missouri's 13th congressional district 1923-1925	Succeeded by Charles E. Kiefner
