= Charles E. Kiefner =

American businessman and politician (1869–1942)

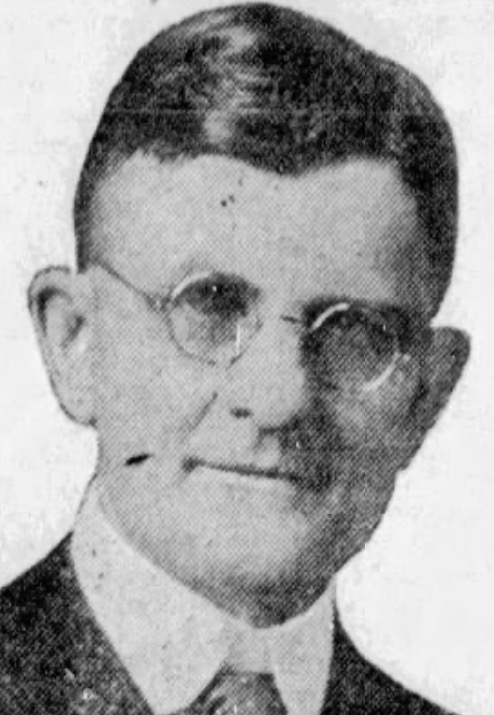

Member of the U.S. House of Representatives from Missouri's 13th district
- In office March 4, 1925 – March 3, 1927
- Preceded by: J. Scott Wolff
- Succeeded by: Clyde Williams
- In office March 4, 1929 – March 3, 1931
- Preceded by: Clyde Williams
- Succeeded by: Clyde Williams

Member of the Missouri House of Representatives from the Perry County district
- In office 1902–1908

Mayor of Perryville, Missouri
- In office 1900–1902
- Preceded by: Robert M. Wilson
- Succeeded by: Thomas E. Hudson

Personal details
- Born: November 25, 1869 Perryville, Missouri, US
- Died: December 13, 1942 (aged 73) Perryville, Missouri, US
- Party: Republican

Charles Edward Kiefner (November 25, 1869 – December 13, 1942) was an American businessman and politician. A Republican, he was a member of the United States House of Representatives from Missouri.

== Biography ==
Kiefner was born on November 25, 1869, in Perryville, Missouri, to John Kiefner and Anna Katherine (née Lakel) Kiefner, both German immigrants. He attended public schools in Perryville, living in Kansas between ages 14 and 18. At age 21, he became a carpenter, and beginning in 1894, engaged in logging; he operated his own businesses for either industry.

A Republican, Kiefner's first political office was as alderman of Perryville. From 1900 to 1902, he served as Mayor of Perryville from 1900 to 1902. From 1902 to 1908, he represented Perry County in the Missouri House of Representatives. He was an alternate delegate to the 1912 Republican National Convention, and in 1916, was chair of the Perry County Republican Party. During World War I, he served on the Perry County Council of Defense. From 1920 to 1924, he served on the staff of Governor Arthur M. Hyde.

Kiefner represented Missouri's 13th congressional district in the United States House of Representatives from March 4, 1925, to March 3, 1927, and again from March 4, 1929, to March 3, 1931. Politically, he was conservative. He was a protectionist and championed industry, having campaigned on his success as a businessman. He also supported the McNary–Haugen Farm Relief Bill.

After serving in Congress, he returned to logging, as well as banking, serving as the president of the Southeast Missouri Lumbermens' Association, and in 1937, was appointed president of the Home Trust Company. He was also chairman of the Perry County chapter of the International Red Cross and Red Crescent Movement. He retired in 1941 due to illness.

On July 10, 1895, Kiefner married Jettie Luckey; they had five children together. He was Presbyterian, and a member of the Freemasons and the Modern Woodmen of America. He died on December 13, 1942, aged 73, in Perryville. He is buried at Home Cemetery, in Perryville, from heart disease. A special collection regarding Kiefner is held by the State Historical Society of Missouri.

U.S. House of Representatives
Preceded by J. Scott Wolff	Member of the U.S. House of Representatives from Missouri's 13th congressional district 1925–1927	Succeeded by Clyde Williams
Preceded by Clyde Williams	Member of the U.S. House of Representatives from Missouri's 13th congressional district 1929–1931	Succeeded by Clyde Williams
