= Gilchrist Porter =

American politician, lawyer and judge (1817–1894)

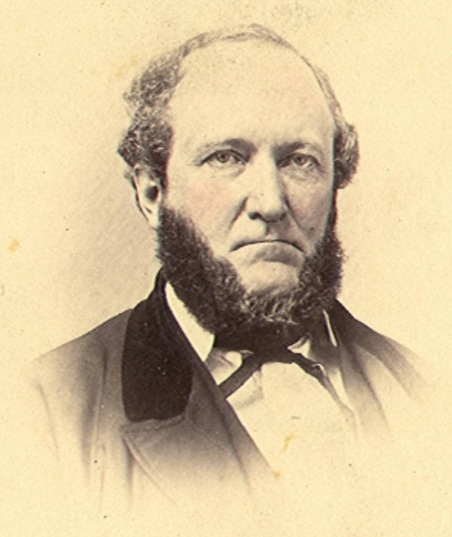
- Porter in 1884

Member of the U.S. House of Representatives from Missouri's 2nd district
- In office March 4, 1851 – March 3, 1853
- Preceded by: William Van Ness Bay
- Succeeded by: Alfred W. Lamb
- In office March 4, 1855 – March 3, 1857
- Preceded by: Alfred W. Lamb
- Succeeded by: Thomas L. Anderson

Member of the Missouri House of Representatives
- In office 1844–1845 Serving with William Biggs

Personal details
- Born: November 1, 1817 Windsor, Virginia, US
- Died: November 1, 1894 (aged 77) Hannibal, Missouri, US
- Party: Whig
- Other political affiliations: Opposition; Democratic
- Relations: James Broadhead (brother-in-law)
- Occupation: Politician, lawyer, judge

Gilchrist Porter (November 1, 1817 – November 1, 1894) was an American politician, lawyer, and judge. A member of the Whig and Opposition parties, he was a member of the United States House of Representatives from Missouri.

== Early life ==
Porter was born on November 1, 1817, in Windsor, Virginia, the son of William Porter and Mary Macaulay (née Duncanson) Porter. He received minimal schooling. In October 1835, he and his father moved to Missouri. Porter read law, being admitted to the bar in 1837.

== Career ==
After being admitted to the bar, Porter began practicing in Bowling Green. He owned slaves. He later moved to St. Louis, serving as a circuit attorney there; he was the inaugural attorney for the 3rd circuit court, serving from August 1838 to 1844. He also established a real estate company, the Gilchrist Porter Realty Company.

Porter was a Whig. After the Whig Party disbanded, he joined the Democratic Party, though did not agree with its platform as much. He was also a member of the Opposition Party, serving a term in Congress with the party. Ideologically, he was conservative.

In 1844 and 1845, Porter was a member of the Missouri House of Representatives, serving alongside William Biggs. He was member of the United States House of Representatives, from March 4, 1851, to March 3, 1853, and again from March 4, 1855, to March 3, 1857, representing Missouri's 2nd district. He declined to run in the election to the 33rd Congress. In his second term, he was a member of the Opposition Party and was chairman of the United States House Committee on Private Land Claims. He was an alternate delegate to the 1864 Democratic National Convention.

After serving in Congress, Porter returned to practicing law. During the American Civil War, he supported the Union, with him working to stop Missouri from seceeding. In 1861, Governor Hamilton Rowan Gamble appointed him judge of the 16th judicial district. He served until 1865, being removed by Governor Thomas Clement Fletcher for "outstanding ordinance". Fletcher appointed him to the 3rd district in 1867. As judge, he was an independent.

== Personal life and death ==
Between was married to Comfort Porter, with whom he had 12 children. He was a member of the Episcopal Church. His brother-in-law was James Broadhead. He died on November 1, 1894, aged 77, in Hannibal, Missouri, from heart failure, and was buried at Riverside Cemetery, in Hannibal.

U.S. House of Representatives
Preceded by William Van Ness Bay	Member of the U.S. House of Representatives from Missouri's 2nd congressional district 1851–1853	Succeeded by Alfred W. Lamb
Preceded by Alfred W. Lamb	Member of the U.S. House of Representatives from Missouri's 2nd congressional district 1855–1857	Succeeded by Thomas L. Anderson
