= List of mayors of Perryville, Missouri =

The city of Perryville, which is located in Missouri's 8th congressional district in southeastern Missouri, is the county seat and the largest city of Perry County. The city was incorporated in 1831.

== List of mayors ==
Perryville mayors since 1882:

Mayor	Took office	Left office	Additional information
Charles A. Weber (1833–1906)	1880	1896	Druggist and apothecary, founder of a general store, county clerk. In 1861, he raised a company for the Missouri Militia and served as its captain. In 1862, he organized the 64th regiment of the Missouri Militia and was commissioned a major. In 1864, he was commissioned a lieutenant colonel of the 64th regiment. In 1889, he was elected a probate judge. Weber was born in Planena in the Kingdom of Prussia. His wife was also a native of the Kingdom of Hanover.
Robert M. Wilson	1896	1900	
Charles Edward Kiefner (1869–1942)	1900	c. 1903	U.S. representative, 1925–1927; 1929–1931
Thomas E. Hudson	1904	1908	
Henry Francis Weiss (1868–1940)	1908	1918	He died in Cape Girardeau, Missouri. His parents were born in Germany in the 1840s.
Dr. Louis W. Holtmann (1886–1918)	c. 1918	1918	Dentist. He died of pneumonia and influenza in Perryville in 1918 at the age of 33.
Henry F. Weiss (1868–1940)	1919	1922	(previously served as mayor, 1908–1918)
Leo A. Herbst (1883–1969)	1922	c. 1923–1924	
Phillip Louis Zoellner (1882–1964)	1923	1932	
John Kiefner	1932	1942	
John Francis Lottes, Jr. (1912–1994)	1942	1948	
Edwin J. Layton (1896–1992)	1948	1950	
Clarence J. Hinni (1907–1989)	1950	1951	
John Francis Lottes, Jr. (1912–1994)	1951	1952	(previously served as mayor, 1942–1948)
Clarence J. Hinni (1907–1989)	1952	1954	(previously served as mayor, 1950–1951)
Wallace Young	1954	1956	
Austin G. Harter (1914–1998)	1956	1960	In 1964, he retired from the U.S. Army Reserve after 33 years.
Carl O. Peterson (1912–1992)	1960	1964	Born in Renville, Minnesota. Former owner of the Perryville Cheese Company.
Wallace Gagnepain (1916–2005)	1964	1972	
Paul L. Gibbar	1972	1978	
Frank W. "Bill" Bergman	1978	1980	
Larry H. Pryor (c. 1939–1993)	1980	1982	He was the owner and operator of the Park-Et Motel. He died in 1993 at Barnes Hospital in St. Louis at age 54.
Kim R. Moore	1982	1984	
Robert J. Miget (1936–2007)	1984	2007	U.S. Army veteran who was employed at the Republic-Monitor newspaper, 1959–2001.
Debbie Gahan	2008		Perryville's first woman mayor.
Ken Baer (born c. 1946)			Former Navy Civil Engineer Corps officer

== Key ==
Key to party colors and abbreviations for members of the U.S. Congress and other politicians or officials
Alaskan Independence (AKIP) Know Nothing (KN) American Labor (AL) Anti-Jacksonian (Anti-J); National Republican (NR) Anti-Administration (AA) Anti-Masonic (Anti-M) Conservative (Con) Covenant (Cov)	Democratic (D) Democratic–Farmer–Labor (DFL) Democratic–NPL (D-NPL) Dixiecrat (Dix), States' Rights (SR) Democratic-Republican (DR) Farmer–Labor (FL) Federalist (F); Pro-Administration (PA)	Free Soil (FS) Fusion (Fus) Greenback (GB) Independence (IPM) Jacksonian (J) Liberal (Lib) Libertarian (L) National Union (NU)	Nonpartisan League (NPL) Nullifier (N) Opposition Northern (O); Opposition Southern (O) Populist (Pop) Progressive (Prog) Prohibition (Proh) Readjuster (Rea)	Republican (R) Silver (Sv) Silver Republican (SvR) Socialist (Soc) Union (U) Unconditional Union (UU) Vermont Progressive (VP) Whig (W)	Independent (I) Nonpartisan (NP)
