= Samuel C. Major =

American politician (1869–1931)

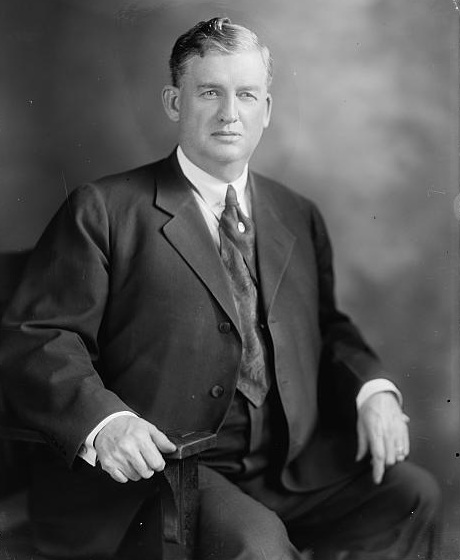

Member of the U.S. House of Representatives from Missouri's 7th district
- In office March 4, 1931 – July 28, 1931
- Preceded by: John W. Palmer
- Succeeded by: Robert D. Johnson
- In office March 4, 1923 – March 3, 1929
- Preceded by: Roscoe C. Patterson
- Succeeded by: John W. Palmer
- In office March 4, 1919 – March 3, 1921
- Preceded by: Courtney W. Hamlin
- Succeeded by: Roscoe C. Patterson

Member of the Missouri Senate
- In office 1907–1911

Personal details
- Born: Samuel Collier Major; July 2, 1869
- Died: July 28, 1931 (aged 62) Fayette, Missouri, U.S.
- Resting place: Fayette City Cemetery, Fayette, Missouri, U.S.
- Party: Democratic
- Education: Central College
- Profession: Politician, lawyer

Samuel Collier Major (July 2, 1869 – July 28, 1931) was a U.S. representative from Missouri.

Born in Fayette, Missouri, Major attended the public schools and Central College at Fayette. He was graduated from St. James Military Academy, Macon, Missouri, in 1888. He studied law and was admitted to the bar in 1890 and commenced practice in Fayette, Missouri.

He was appointed prosecuting attorney of Howard County in 1892 and later was elected to the office for two terms. He served in the Missouri Senate in 1907–1911. He was an unsuccessful candidate for election in 1916 to the Sixty-fifth Congress.

Major was elected as a Democrat to the Sixty-sixth Congress (March 4, 1919 – March 3, 1921). He was an unsuccessful candidate for reelection in 1920 to the Sixty-seventh Congress and resumed the practice of law in Fayette, Missouri.

Major was elected to the Sixty-eighth, Sixty-ninth, and Seventieth Congresses (March 4, 1923 – March 3, 1929). He was an unsuccessful candidate for reelection in 1928 to the Seventy-first Congress.

Major was elected to the Seventy-second Congress and served from March 4, 1931, until his death in Fayette, Missouri, July 28, 1931. He was interred in Fayette City Cemetery.

== See also ==
- List of members of the United States Congress who died in office (1900–1949)

U.S. House of Representatives
Preceded by Courtney W. Hamlin	Member of the U.S. House of Representatives from Missouri's 7th congressional district 1919–1921	Succeeded by Roscoe C. Patterson
Preceded by Roscoe C. Patterson	Member of the U.S. House of Representatives from Missouri's 7th congressional district 1923–1929	Succeeded by John W. Palmer
Preceded by John W. Palmer	Member of the U.S. House of Representatives from Missouri's 7th congressional district 1931	Succeeded by Robert D. Johnson
