= Walter Lewis Hensley =

American politician

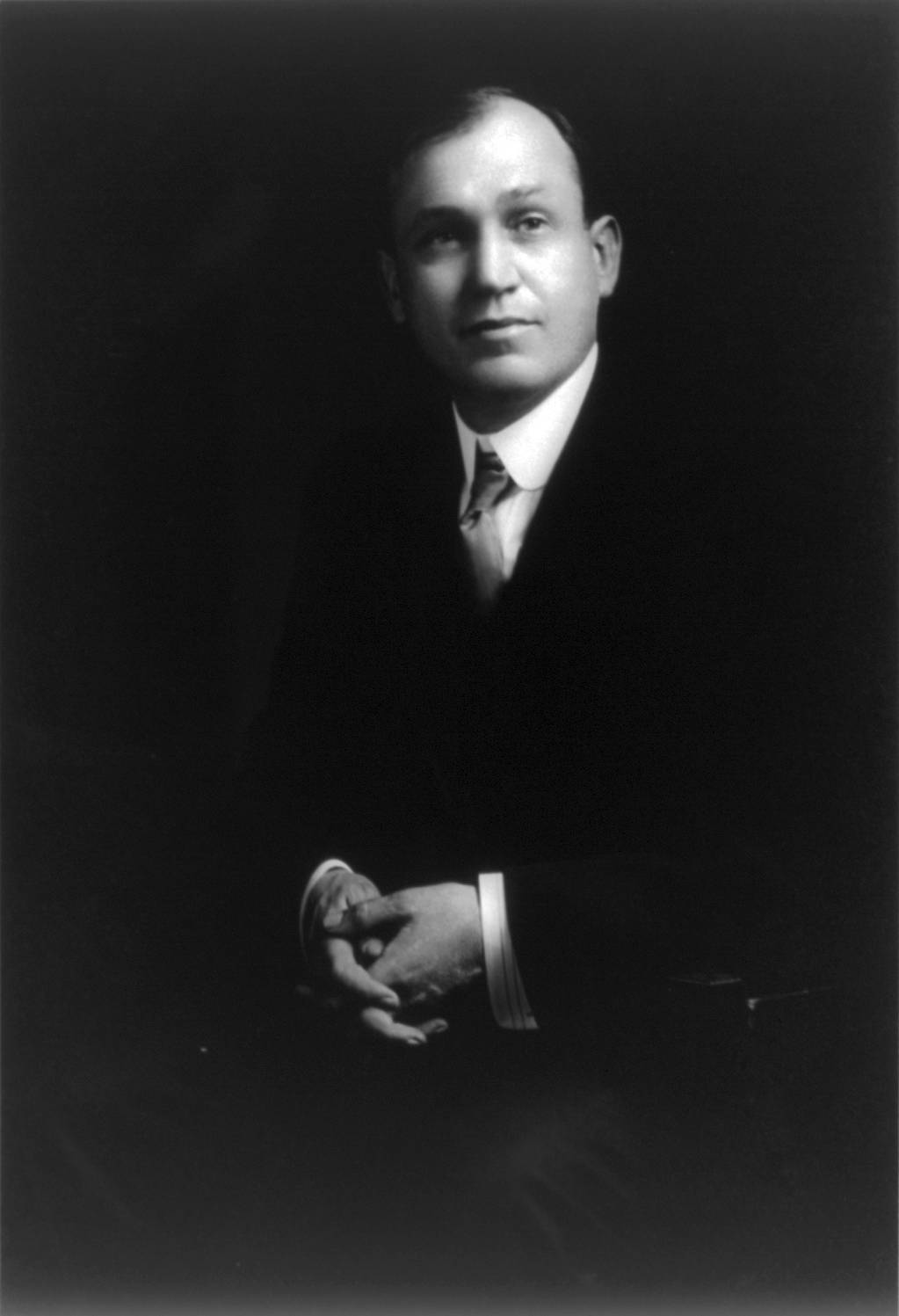
Walter Lewis Hensley

Walter Lewis Hensley (September 3, 1871 – July 18, 1946) was a U.S. representative from Missouri.

Born near Pevely, Missouri, Hensley attended the public schools and the law department of the University of Missouri. He was admitted to the bar in 1894 and commenced practice in Wayne County, Missouri. He moved to Bonne Terre, St. Francois County, Missouri, and continued the practice of law. He served as prosecuting attorney of St. Francois County 1898-1902. He moved to Farmington, Missouri, and practiced law.

Hensley was elected as a Democrat to the Sixty-second and to the three succeeding Congresses (March 4, 1911 – March 3, 1919). On April 5, 1917, he joined 49 other representatives in voting against declaring war on Germany. He was not a candidate for renomination in 1918. United States district attorney from March 1919 until he resigned in May 1920. Reengaged in the private practice of law in St. Louis, Missouri, until 1936, when he retired and moved to near Pevely. He died at his summer home in Ludington, Michigan, July 18, 1946. He was interred in Sandy Baptist Cemetery, near Pevely, Missouri.

U.S. House of Representatives
Preceded by Politte Elvins	Member of the U.S. House of Representatives from Missouri's 13th congressional district 1911-1919	Succeeded by Marion E. Rhodes
