= James F. Fulbright =

American politician (1877–1948)

James Fulbright
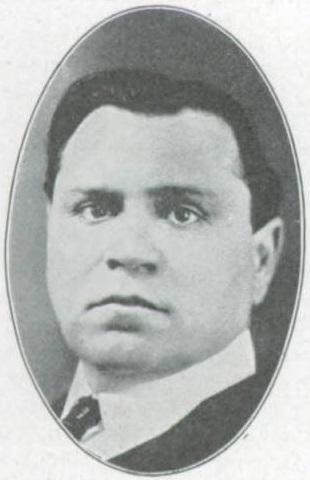

Prosecuting Attorney for Ripley County
- In office 1906–1910

Member of the Missouri House of Representatives
- In office 1913–1919

Mayor of Doniphan, Missouri
- In office 1919–1921

U.S. Representative for Missouri's 14th Congressional District
- In office March 4, 1923 – March 3, 1925
- Preceded by: Edward D. Hays
- Succeeded by: Ralph E. Bailey
- In office March 4, 1927 – March 3, 1929
- Preceded by: Ralph E. Bailey
- Succeeded by: Dewey J. Short
- In office March 4, 1931 – March 3, 1933
- Preceded by: Dewey J. Short
- Succeeded by: District dissolved

Judge of the Springfield Court of Appeals
- In office January 1, 1937 – April 5, 1948

Personal details
- Born: James Franklin Fulbright; January 24, 1877 Millersville, Missouri, U.S.
- Died: April 5, 1948 (aged 71) Springfield, Missouri, U.S.
- Resting place: Doniphan Cemetery, Doniphan, Missouri, U.S.
- Party: Democratic

James Franklin Fulbright (January 24, 1877 – April 5, 1948) was a U.S. representative from Missouri.

Born near Millersville, Missouri, Fulbright attended the public schools and was graduated from the State Normal School, Cape Girardeau, Missouri, in 1900. He taught school in Cape Girardeau and Ripley Counties for several years. He attended the Washington University School of Law, for a short time. He was admitted to the bar in 1903 and commenced practice in Doniphan, Missouri, in 1904. He was appointed and subsequently elected prosecuting attorney of Ripley County in 1906. He was reelected in 1908 and 1910. He served as member of the State house of representatives 1913-1919, serving as speaker pro tempore 1915-1919. He served as mayor of Doniphan, Missouri from 1919 to 1921.

Fulbright was elected as a Democrat to the Sixty-eighth Congress (March 4, 1923 – March 3, 1925). He was an unsuccessful candidate for reelection in 1924 to the Sixty-ninth Congress.

Fulbright was elected to the Seventieth Congress (March 4, 1927 – March 3, 1929). He was an unsuccessful candidate for reelection in 1928 to the Seventy-first Congress.

Fulbright was elected to the Seventy-second Congress (March 4, 1931 – March 3, 1933). He was an unsuccessful candidate for renomination in 1932. He resumed the practice of law. He served as delegate to the Democratic National Convention in 1928. Permanent chairman of the Democratic State convention in 1936.

Fulbright was elected judge of the Springfield Court of Appeals in 1936 and served from January 1, 1937, until his death in Springfield, Missouri, April 5, 1948. He was interred in Doniphan Cemetery, Doniphan, Missouri.

U.S. House of Representatives
Preceded by Edward D. Hays	Member of the U.S. House of Representatives from Missouri's 14th congressional district 1923–1925	Succeeded by Ralph E. Bailey
Preceded by Ralph E. Bailey	Member of the U.S. House of Representatives from Missouri's 14th congressional district 1927–1929	Succeeded by Dewey Short
Preceded by Dewey Short	Member of the U.S. House of Representatives from Missouri's 14th congressional district 1931–1933	Succeeded by District dissolved
