= Alfred W. Lamb =

American politician and lawyer (1824–1888)

Member of the U.S. House of Representatives from Missouri's 2nd district
- In office March 4, 1853 – March 3, 1855
- Preceded by: Gilchrist Porter
- Succeeded by: Gilchrist Porter

Personal details
- Born: Alfred William Lamb; March 18, 1824 Stamford, New York, US
- Died: April 29, 1888 (aged 64) Hannibal, Missouri, US
- Party: Democratic
- Profession: Politician, lawyer

Alfred William Lamb (March 18, 1824 – April 29, 1888) was an American politician and lawyer. A Democrat, he was a member of the United States House of Representatives from Missouri.

== Biography ==
Lamb was born on March 18, 1824, in Stamford, New York. However, one source claims he was born in 1828, in Virginia, where he attended a college. In 1836, he and his parents moved to Ralls County, Missouri. He attended Doctor Ely's School, in Ely. He read law, and after being admitted to the bar, began practicing in Hannibal. He was also a prominent railroader in the area. He owned slaves.

Lamb was a Democrat. He was a member of the United States House of Representatives, from March 4, 1853, to March 3, 1855, representing Missouri's 2nd district. He refused nomination for the following election. He was a delegate to the 1876 Democratic National Convention. Ideologically, he was liberal.

After serving in Congress, Lamb returned to practicing law. In 1882, his nephew, Charley Lamb, was arrested and charged with murder, though disappeared shortly thereafter. Lamb died on April 29, 1888, aged 64, in Hannibal, and was buried at Riverside Cemetery, in Hannibal.

U.S. House of Representatives
Preceded by Gilchrist Porter	Member of the U.S. House of Representatives from Missouri's 2nd congressional district 1853–1855	Succeeded by Gilchrist Porter
