= Clyde Williams (Missouri politician) =

American politician (1873–1954)

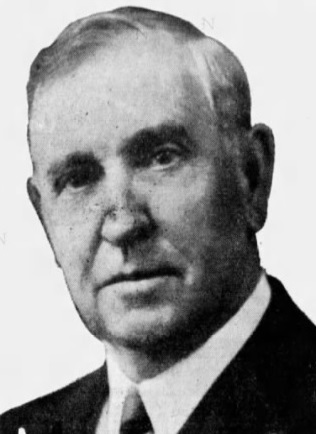
- The Democrat-News (Fredericktown, Missouri), July 25, 1940

Member of the U.S. House of Representatives from Missouri
- In office March 4, 1927 – March 3, 1929
- Preceded by: Charles E. Kiefner
- Succeeded by: Charles E. Kiefner
- Constituency: 13th district
- In office March 4, 1931 – January 3, 1943
- Preceded by: Charles E. Kiefner (13th); William L. Nelson (8th)
- Succeeded by: District eliminated (13th); William P. Elmer (8th)
- Constituency: 13th district (1931-33); 8th district (1933-43)

Personal details
- Born: October 13, 1873 near Grubville, Missouri, U.S.
- Died: November 12, 1954 (aged 81) St. Louis, Missouri, U.S.
- Resting place: Hillsboro Cemetery, Hillsboro, Missouri, U.S.
- Party: Democratic
- Education: University of Missouri School of Law
- Profession: Politician, lawyer

Clyde Williams (October 13, 1873 – November 12, 1954) was a U.S. Representative from Missouri.

Born on a farm near Grubville, Missouri, Williams attended the county schools, De Soto High School, and the State normal school at Cape Girardeau. He was graduated from the law department of the University of Missouri in 1901. He was admitted to the bar the same year and commenced practice in De Soto, Missouri. He served as prosecuting attorney of Jefferson County in 1902–1908.

Williams was elected as a Democrat to the Seventieth Congress (March 4, 1927 – March 3, 1929). He was an unsuccessful candidate for reelection in 1928 to the Seventy-first Congress. He resumed the practice of law.

Williams was elected to the Seventy-second and to the five succeeding Congresses (March 4, 1931 – January 3, 1943). He was an unsuccessful candidate for reelection in 1942 to the Seventy-eighth Congress. He engaged in legal work for the Reconstruction Finance Corporation in Washington, D.C. from 1943 to 1945. He served as president of the Jefferson Trust Co. in Hillsboro and president of the Bank of Hillsboro. He died in St. Louis, Missouri, November 12, 1954. He was interred in Hillsboro Cemetery, Hillsboro, Missouri.

U.S. House of Representatives
Preceded by Charles E. Kiefner	Member of the U.S. House of Representatives from Missouri's 13th congressional district 1927–1929	Succeeded by Charles E. Kiefner
Preceded by Charles E. Kiefner	Member of the U.S. House of Representatives from Missouri's 13th congressional district 1931–1933	Succeeded by District inactive
Preceded by William L. Nelson	Member of the U.S. House of Representatives from Missouri's 8th congressional district 1933–1943	Succeeded by William P. Elmer
