= List of United States representatives from Missouri =

The following is an alphabetical list of United States representatives from the state of Missouri. For chronological tables of members of both houses of the United States Congress from the state (through the present day), see Missouri's congressional delegations. The list of names should be complete, but other data may be incomplete.

== Current representatives ==
Current as of January 3, 2025.

- 1st district: Wesley Bell (D) (since 2025)
- 2nd district: Ann Wagner (R) (since 2013)
- 3rd district: Bob Onder (R) (since 2025)
- 4th district: Mark Alford (R) (since 2023)
- 5th district: Emanuel Cleaver (D) (since 2005)
- 6th district: Sam Graves (R) (since 2001)
- 7th district: Eric Burlison (R) (since 2023)
- 8th district: Jason T. Smith (R) (since 2013)

== List of members and delegates ==
This is a list of United States representatives from Missouri and non-voting delegates from Missouri Territory. Statehood was granted in 1821.

Member	Party	Years	District	Electoral history
Thomas Peter Akers	Know Nothing	August 18, 1856 – March 3, 1857	5th	Elected to finish Miller's term. Retired.
Todd Akin	Republican	January 3, 2001 – January 3, 2013	2nd	Elected in 2000. Retired to run for U.S. Senator.
Armstead M. Alexander	Democratic	March 4, 1883 – March 3, 1885	2nd	Elected in 1882. Lost renomination to Hale.
Joshua W. Alexander	Democratic	March 4, 1907 – December 15, 1919	3rd	Elected in 1906. Resigned to become U.S. Secretary of Commerce.
Mark Alford	Republican	January 3, 2023 – present	4th	Elected in 2022. Incumbent.
Thomas Allen	Democratic	March 4, 1881 – April 8, 1882	2nd	Elected in 1880. Died.
Charles Arthur Anderson	Democratic	January 3, 1937 – January 3, 1941	12th	Elected in 1936. Lost re-election to Ploeser.
George W. Anderson	Republican	March 4, 1865 – March 3, 1869	9th	Elected in 1864. Retired.
Thomas Lilbourne Anderson	Know Nothing	March 4, 1857 – March 3, 1859	2nd	Elected in 1856. Switched parties.
Thomas Lilbourne Anderson	Independent Democratic	March 4, 1859 – March 3, 1861	2nd	Re-elected in 1858 as an Independent Democrat. Retired.
Orland K. Armstrong	Republican	January 3, 1951 – January 3, 1953	6th	Elected in 1950. Retired.
Marshall Arnold	Democratic	March 4, 1891 – March 3, 1895	14th	Elected in 1890. Lost re-election to Mozley.
Samuel W. Arnold	Republican	January 3, 1943 – January 3, 1949	1st	Elected in 1942. Lost re-election to Magee.
William Henry Ashley	Jacksonian	October 31, 1831 – March 3, 1837	At-large	Elected to finish Pettis's term. Retired to run for governor.
Joel Funk Asper	Republican	March 4, 1869 – March 3, 1871	7th	Elected in 1868. Retired.
William O. Atkeson	Republican	March 4, 1921 – March 3, 1923	6th	Elected in 1920. Lost re-election to Dickinson.
Ralph Emerson Bailey	Republican	March 4, 1925 – March 3, 1927	14th	Elected in 1924. Retired.
Wendell Bailey	Republican	January 3, 1981 – January 3, 1983	8th	Elected in 1980. Redistricted to the 4th district and lost re-election to Skelton.
Claude I. Bakewell	Republican	January 3, 1947 – January 3, 1949	11th	Elected in 1946. Lost re-election to Sullivan.
Claude I. Bakewell	Republican	March 9, 1951 – January 3, 1953	11th	Elected to finish Sullivan's term. Redistricted to the 3rd district and lost re-election to L. Sullivan.
Parke M. Banta	Republican	January 3, 1947 – January 3, 1949	8th	Elected in 1946. Lost re-election to Carnahan.
John Richard Barret	Democratic	March 4, 1859 – June 8, 1860	1st	Elected in 1858. Lost contested election to F. Blair.
John Richard Barret	Democratic	October 3, 1860 – March 3, 1861	1st	Elected to finish Blair's term. Lost re-election to F. Blair.
Richard Bartholdt	Republican	March 4, 1893 – March 3, 1915	10th	Elected in 1892. Retired.
William Edward Barton	Democratic	March 4, 1931 – March 3, 1933	16th	Elected in 1930; Redistricted to At-large district and lost renomination to 13 others. (Note: Romjue, Lozier, Duncan, Milligan, Shannon, R. Wood, Dickinson, William, Cannon, Lee, Ruffin, Claiborne and Cochran)
Edward Bates	Anti-Jacksonian	March 4, 1827 – March 3, 1829	At-large	Elected in 1826. Lost re-election to Pettis.
William Van Ness Bay	Democratic	March 4, 1849 – March 3, 1851	2nd	Elected in 1848. Retired.
C. Jasper Bell	Democratic	January 3, 1935 – January 3, 1949	4th	Elected in 1934. Retired.
Wesley Bell	Democratic	January 3, 2025 – present	1st	Elected in 2024. Incumbent.
John F. Benjamin	Republican	March 4, 1865 – March 3, 1871	8th	Elected in 1864. Retired.
Marion T. Bennett	Republican	January 12, 1943 – January 3, 1949	6th	Elected to finish his father's term. Lost re-election to Christopher.
Philip Allen Bennett	Republican	January 3, 1941 – December 7, 1942	6th	Elected in 1940. Re-elected but died before term began.
Maecenas Eason Benton	Democratic	March 4, 1897 – March 3, 1905	15th	Elected in 1896. Lost re-election to Shartel.
Thomas Hart Benton	Democratic	March 4, 1853 – March 3, 1855	1st	Elected in 1852. Lost re-election to Kennett.
Francis Preston Blair Jr.	Republican	March 4, 1857 – March 3, 1859	1st	Elected in 1856. Lost re-election to Barret.
Francis Preston Blair Jr.	Republican	June 8, 1860 – June 25, 1860	1st	Won contested election. Resigned.
Francis Preston Blair Jr.	Republican	March 4, 1861 – June 10, 1864	1st	Elected in 1860. Lost contested election to Knox.
James G. Blair	Liberal Republican	March 4, 1871 – March 3, 1873	8th	Elected in 1870. Retired.
Richard P. Bland	Democratic	March 4, 1873 – March 3, 1883	5th	Elected in 1872. Redistricted to the 11th district.
Richard P. Bland	Democratic	March 4, 1883 – March 3, 1893	11th	Redistricted from the 5th district and re-elected in 1882. Redistricted to the 8th district.
Richard P. Bland	Democratic	March 4, 1893 – March 3, 1895	8th	Redistricted from the 11th district and re-elected in 1892. Lost re-election to Hubbard.
Richard P. Bland	Democratic	March 4, 1897 – June 15, 1899	8th	Elected in 1896. Died.
William Thomas Bland	Democratic	March 4, 1919 – March 3, 1921	5th	Elected in 1918. Lost re-election to Ellis.
Henry Taylor Blow	Unconditional Unionist	March 4, 1863 – March 3, 1865	2nd	Elected in 1862. Switched parties.
Henry Taylor Blow	Republican	March 4, 1865 – March 3, 1867	2nd	Re-elected in 1864 as a Republican. Retired.
Roy Blunt	Republican	January 3, 1997 – January 3, 2011	7th	Elected in 1996. Retired to run for U.S. Senator.
Robert N. Bodine	Democratic	March 4, 1897 – March 3, 1899	2nd	Elected in 1896. Lost renomination to Rucker.
Richard Walker Bolling	Democratic	January 3, 1949 – January 3, 1983	5th	Elected in 1948. Retired.
Charles F. Booher	Democratic	February 19, 1889 – March 4, 1889	4th	Elected to finish Burnes's term in the 50th Congress. Retired.
Charles F. Booher	Democratic	March 4, 1907 – January 21, 1921	4th	Elected in 1906. Retired but died before term ended.
William Patterson Borland	Democratic	March 4, 1909 – February 20, 1919	5th	Elected in 1908. Lost renomination to W. Bland and died before term ended.
Gustavus Miller Bower	Democratic	March 4, 1843 – March 3, 1845	At-large	Elected in 1842. Retired.
James B. Bowlin	Democratic	March 4, 1843 – March 3, 1847	At-large	Elected in 1842. Redistricted to the 1st district.
James B. Bowlin	Democratic	March 4, 1847 – March 3, 1851	1st	Redistricted from the at-large district and re-elected in 1846. Lost re-election to Darby.
Sempronius H. Boyd	Unionist	March 4, 1863 – March 3, 1865	4th	Elected in 1862. Retired.
Sempronius H. Boyd	Republican	March 4, 1869 – March 3, 1871	4th	Elected in 1868. Retired.
James Broadhead	Democratic	March 4, 1883 – March 3, 1885	9th	Elected in 1882. Retired.
Charles Harrison Brown	Democratic	January 3, 1957 – January 3, 1961	7th	Elected in 1956. Lost re-election to D. Hall.
Aylett Hawes Buckner	Democratic	March 4, 1873 – March 3, 1883	13th	Elected in 1872. Redistricted to the 7th district.
Aylett Hawes Buckner	Democratic	March 4, 1883 – March 3, 1885	7th	Redistricted from the 13th district and re-elected in 1882. Retired.
Jack Buechner	Republican	January 3, 1987 – January 3, 1991	2nd	Elected in 1986. Lost re-election to Horn.
John Bull	Anti-Jacksonian	March 4, 1833 – March 3, 1835	At-large	Elected in 1833. Retired.
Samuel Swinfin Burdett	Republican	March 4, 1869 – March 3, 1873	5th	Elected in 1868. Lost re-election to R. Bland.
Bill Burlison	Democratic	January 3, 1969 – January 3, 1981	10th	Elected in 1968. Lost re-election to Emerson.
Eric Burlison	Republican	January 3, 2023 – present	7th	Elected in 2022. Incumbent.
Daniel Dee Burnes	Democratic	March 4, 1893 – March 3, 1895	4th	Elected in 1892. Retired.
James N. Burnes	Democratic	March 4, 1883 – January 23, 1889	4th	Elected in 1882. Re-elected but died before term started.
Joseph Henry Burrows	Greenback	March 4, 1881 – March 3, 1883	10th	Elected in 1880. Lost re-election to Clardy.
Charles Germman Burton	Republican	March 4, 1895 – March 3, 1897	15th	Elected in 1894. Lost re-election to M. Benton.
Cori Bush	Democratic	January 3, 2021 – January 3, 2025	1st	Elected in 2020. Lost renomination to Wesley Bell.
James Joseph Butler	Democratic	March 4, 1901 – June 28, 1902	12th	Elected in 1900. Seat declared Vacant.
James Joseph Butler	Democratic	November 4, 1902 – February 26, 1903	12th	Elected to fill the vacant seat. Lost election contest to Wagoner.
James Joseph Butler	Democratic	March 4, 1903 – March 3, 1905	12th	Elected in 1902. Retired.
Samuel Byrns	Democratic	March 4, 1891 – March 3, 1893	10th	Elected in 1890. Lost renomination to Kehr.
Clarence Cannon	Democratic	March 4, 1923 – March 3, 1933	9th	Elected in 1922. Redistricted to the at-large district.
Clarence Cannon	Democratic	March 4, 1933 – January 3, 1935	At-large	Redistricted from the 9th district and Re-elected in 1932. Redistricted to the 9th district.
Clarence Cannon	Democratic	January 3, 1935 – May 12, 1964	9th	Redistricted from the at-large district and re-elected in 1934. Died.
A. S. J. Carnahan	Democratic	January 3, 1945 – January 3, 1947	8th	Elected in 1944. Lost re-election to Banta.
A. S. J. Carnahan	Democratic	January 3, 1949 – January 3, 1961	8th	Elected in 1948. Lost renomination to Ichord.
Russ Carnahan	Democratic	January 3, 2005 – January 3, 2013	3rd	Elected in 2004. Redistricted to the 1st district and lost renomination to L. Clay.
Samuel Caruthers	Whig	March 4, 1853 – March 3, 1855	7th	Elected in 1852. Switched parties.
Samuel Caruthers	Opposition	March 4, 1855 – March 3, 1857	7th	Re-elected in 1854 as an Opposition party candidate. Switched parties.
Samuel Caruthers	Democratic	March 4, 1857 – March 3, 1859	7th	Re-elected in 1856 as a Democrat. Retired.
Theron Ephron Catlin	Republican	March 4, 1911 – August 12, 1912	11th	Elected in 1910. Lost contested election to Gill.
Henry S. Caulfield	Republican	March 4, 1907 – March 3, 1909	11th	Elected in 1906. Retired.
George H. Christopher	Democratic	January 3, 1949 – January 3, 1951	6th	Elected in 1948. Lost re-election to Armstrong.
George H. Christopher	Democratic	January 3, 1955 – January 23, 1959	4th	Elected in 1954. Died.
James Robert Claiborne	Democratic	March 4, 1933 – January 3, 1935	At-large	Elected in 1932. Redistricted to the 12th district.
James Robert Claiborne	Democratic	January 3, 1935 – January 3, 1937	12th	Redistricted from the at-large district and re-elected in 1934. Lost renomination to C. Anderson.
Martin L. Clardy	Democratic	March 4, 1879 – March 3, 1883	1st	Elected in 1878. Redistricted to the 10th district.
Martin L. Clardy	Democratic	March 4, 1883 – March 3, 1889	10th	Redistricted]] from the 1st district and re-elected in 1882. Lost re-election to Kinsey.
Champ Clark	Democratic	March 4, 1893 – March 3, 1895	9th	Elected in 1892. Lost re-election to Treloar.
Champ Clark	Democratic	March 4, 1897 – March 2, 1921	9th	Elected in 1896. Lost re-election to Hukriede and died before term ended.
Charles Nelson Clark	Republican	March 4, 1895 – March 3, 1897	1st	Elected in 1894. Retired.
John Bullock Clark	Democratic	December 7, 1857 – July 13, 1861	3rd	Elected after James S. Green was elected to US Senate prior to being seated. Expelled after taking up arms against the Union.
John Bullock Clark Jr.	Democratic	March 4, 1873 – March 3, 1883	11th	Elected in 1872. Lost renomination to R. Bland.
Bill Clay	Democratic	January 3, 1969 – January 3, 2001	1st	Elected in 1968. Retired.
Lacy Clay	Democratic	January 3, 2001 – January 3, 2021	1st	Elected in 2000. Lost renomination to Bush.
Emanuel Cleaver	Democratic	January 3, 2005 – present	5th	Elected in 2004. Incumbent.
Seth Wallace Cobb	Democratic	March 4, 1891 – March 3, 1893	9th	Elected in 1890. Redistricted to the 12th district.
Seth Wallace Cobb	Democratic	March 4, 1893 – March 3, 1897	12th	Redistricted from the 9th district and re-elected in 1892. Retired.
Charles F. Cochran	Democratic	March 4, 1897 – March 3, 1905	4th	Elected in 1896. Withdrew from renomination.
John J. Cochran	Democratic	November 2, 1926 – March 3, 1933	11th	Elected to finish Hawes's term. Redistricted to the at-large district.
John J. Cochran	Democratic	March 4, 1933 – January 3, 1935	At-large	Redistricted from the 11th district and re-elected in 1932. Redistricted to the 13th district.
John J. Cochran	Democratic	January 3, 1935 – January 3, 1947	13th	Redistricted from the at-large district and re-elected in 1934. Retired.
Nathan Cole	Republican	March 4, 1877 – March 3, 1879	2nd	Elected in 1876. Lost re-election to Wells.
William Clay Cole	Republican	January 3, 1943 – January 3, 1949	3rd	Elected in 1942. Lost re-election to Welch.
William Clay Cole	Republican	January 3, 1953 – January 3, 1955	6th	Elected in 1952. Lost re-election to Hull Jr.
Earl Thomas Coleman	Republican	November 2, 1976 – January 3, 1993	6th	Elected to finish Litton's term. Lost re-election to Danner.
George H. Combs Jr.	Democratic	March 4, 1927 – March 3, 1929	5th	Elected in 1926. Retired.
Abram Comingo	Democratic	March 4, 1871 – March 3, 1873	6th	Elected in 1870. Redistricted to the 8th district.
Abram Comingo	Democratic	March 4, 1873 – March 3, 1875	8th	Redistricted from the 6th district and re-elected in 1872. Retired.
James Cooney	Democratic	March 4, 1897 – March 3, 1903	7th	Elected in 1896. Lost renomination to Hamlin.
John Cosgrove	Democratic	March 4, 1883 – March 3, 1885	6th	Elected in 1882. Renominated but withdrew before election.
Harry M. Coudrey	Republican	June 23, 1906 – March 3, 1911	12th	Won election contest. Retired.
William S. Cowherd	Democratic	March 4, 1897 – March 3, 1905	5th	Elected in 1896. Lost re-election to Ellis.
James Craig	Democratic	March 4, 1857 – March 3, 1861	4th	Elected in 1856. Retired.
Thomas Theodore Crittenden	Democratic	March 4, 1873 – March 3, 1875	7th	Elected in 1872. Retired.
Thomas Theodore Crittenden	Democratic	March 4, 1877 – March 3, 1879	7th	Elected in 1876. Retired.
Charles A. Crow	Republican	March 4, 1909 – March 3, 1911	14th	Elected in 1908. Lost re-election to Russell.
George Calhoun Crowther	Republican	March 4, 1895 – March 3, 1897	4th	Elected in 1894. Lost re-election to C. Cochran.
Thomas B. Curtis	Republican	January 3, 1951 – January 3, 1953	12th	Elected in 1950. Redistricted to the 2nd district.
Thomas B. Curtis	Republican	January 3, 1953 – January 3, 1969	2nd	Redistricted from the 12th district and re-elected in 1952. Retired to run for U.S. senator.
Pat Danner	Democratic	January 3, 1993 – January 3, 2001	6th	Elected in 1992. Retired.
John Fletcher Darby	Whig	March 4, 1851 – March 3, 1853	1st	Elected in 1850. Retired.
Lowndes Henry Davis	Democratic	March 4, 1879 – March 3, 1883	4th	Elected in 1878. Redistricted to the 14th district.
Lowndes Henry Davis	Democratic	March 4, 1883 – March 3, 1885	14th	Redistricted from the 4th district and re-elected in 1882. Retired.
James Alexander Daugherty	Democratic	March 4, 1911 – March 3, 1913	15th	Elected in 1910. Lost renomination to Decker.
William Dawson	Democratic	March 4, 1885 – March 3, 1887	14th	Elected in 1884. Lost renomination to Walker.
David A. De Armond	Democratic	March 4, 1891 – March 3, 1893	12th	Elected in 1890. Redistricted to the 6th district.
David A. De Armond	Democratic	March 4, 1893 – November 23, 1909	6th	Redistricted from the 12th district and re-elected in 1892. Died.
Rezin A. De Bolt	Democratic	March 4, 1875 – March 3, 1877	10th	Elected in 1874. Retired.
Perl D. Decker	Democratic	March 4, 1913 – March 3, 1919	15th	Elected in 1912. Lost re-election to McPherson.
Clement C. Dickinson	Democratic	February 1, 1910 – March 3, 1921	6th	Elected to finish De Armond's term. Lost re-election to Atkeson.
Clement C. Dickinson	Democratic	March 4, 1923 – March 3, 1929	6th	Elected in 1922. Lost re-election to Halsey.
Clement C. Dickinson	Democratic	March 4, 1931 – March 3, 1933	6th	Elected in 1930. Redistricted to the At-large district.
Clement C. Dickinson	Democratic	March 4, 1933 – January 3, 1935	At-large	Redistricted from the 6th district and re-elected in 1932. Redistricted to the 6th district and lost renomination to Wood.
Alexander Monroe Dockery	Democratic	March 4, 1883 – March 3, 1899	3rd	Elected in 1882. Retired.
John Dougherty	Democratic	March 4, 1899 – March 3, 1905	3rd	Elected in 1898. Lost renomination.
Richard M. Duncan	Democratic	March 4, 1933 – January 3, 1935	At-large	Elected in 1932. Redistricted to the 3rd district.
Richard M. Duncan	Democratic	January 3, 1935 – January 3, 1943	3rd	Redistricted from the at-large district and re-elected in 1934. Lost re-election to W. Cole.
David Patterson Dyer	Republican	March 4, 1869 – March 3, 1871	9th	Elected in 1868. Lost re-election to A. King.
Leonidas C. Dyer	Republican	March 4, 1911 – June 19, 1914	12th	Elected in 1910. Lost election contest to M. Gill.
Leonidas C. Dyer	Republican	March 4, 1915 – March 3, 1933	12th	Elected in 1914. Redistricted to the at-large district and lost re-election to 13 Democrats.
Rufus Easton	None	September 17, 1814 – August 5, 1816	Territory	Elected in 1814. Lost re-election to J. Scott.
John Cummins Edwards	Democratic	March 4, 1841 – March 3, 1843	At-large	Elected in 1840. Retired.
Edgar C. Ellis	Republican	March 4, 1905 – March 3, 1909	5th	Elected in 1904. Lost re-election to Borland.
Edgar C. Ellis	Republican	March 4, 1921 – March 3, 1923	5th	Elected in 1920. Lost re-election to Jost.
Edgar C. Ellis	Republican	March 4, 1925 – March 3, 1927	5th	Elected in 1924. Lost re-election to Combs Jr.
Edgar C. Ellis	Republican	March 4, 1929 – March 3, 1931	5th	Elected in 1928. Lost re-election to Shannon.
William P. Elmer	Republican	January 3, 1943 – January 3, 1945	8th	Elected in 1942. Lost re-election to Carnahan.
Politte Elvins	Republican	March 4, 1909 – March 3, 1911	13th	Elected in 1908. Lost re-election to Hensley.
Bill Emerson	Republican	January 3, 1981 – January 3, 1983	10th	Elected in 1980. Redistricted to the 8th district.
Bill Emerson	Republican	January 3, 1983 – June 22, 1996	8th	Redistricted from the 10th district and re-elected in 1982. Died.
Jo Ann Emerson	Republican	November 5, 1996 – January 3, 1997	8th	Elected to finish her husband's term.
Jo Ann Emerson	Independent	January 3, 1997 – January 8, 1997	8th	Also elected in 1996 as an Independent caucusing with Republicans due to Missouri state law.
Jo Ann Emerson	Republican	January 8, 1997 – January 22, 2013	8th	Joined Republican party. Resigned to become CEO of NRECA.
Frederick Essen	Republican	November 5, 1918 – March 3, 1919	10th	Elected to finish Meeker's term. Retired.
Charles L. Faust	Republican	March 4, 1921 – December 17, 1928	4th	Elected in 1920. Re-elected but died before term began.
Gustavus A. Finkelnburg	Republican	March 4, 1869 – March 3, 1871	2nd	Elected in 1868. Switched parties.
Gustavus A. Finkelnburg	Liberal Republican	March 4, 1871 – March 3, 1873	2nd	Re-elected in 1870 as a Liberal Republican. Retired.
Nicholas Ford	Greenback	March 4, 1879 – March 3, 1883	9th	Elected in 1878. Lost re-election to Broadhead.
Nathan Frank	Republican	March 4, 1889 – March 3, 1891	9th	Elected in 1888. Retired.
Benjamin Joseph Franklin	Democratic	March 4, 1875 – March 3, 1879	8th	Elected in 1874. Withdrew during renomination.
Richard Graham Frost	Democratic	March 4, 1879 – March 2, 1883	3rd	Elected in 1878. Retired but lost contested election before next term began.
James F. Fulbright	Democratic	March 4, 1923 – March 3, 1925	14th	Elected in 1922. Lost re-election to R. Bailey.
James F. Fulbright	Democratic	March 4, 1927 – March 3, 1929	14th	Elected in 1926. Lost re-election to Short.
James F. Fulbright	Democratic	March 4, 1931 – March 3, 1933	14th	Elected in 1930. Redistricted to the At-large district and lost renomination to 13 others.
Frank B. Fulkerson	Republican	March 4, 1905 – March 3, 1907	4th	Elected in 1904. Lost re-election to Booher.
Robert Washington Fyan	Democratic	March 4, 1883 – March 3, 1885	13th	Elected in 1882. Lost re-election to Wade.
Robert Washington Fyan	Democratic	March 4, 1891 – March 3, 1895	13th	Elected in 1890. Retired.
Dick Gephardt	Democratic	January 3, 1977 – January 3, 2005	3rd	Elected in 1976. Retired to run for Democratic nominee for president.
Michael Joseph Gill	Democratic	June 19, 1914 – March 3, 1915	12th	Won election contest. Lost re-election to L. Dyer.
Patrick F. Gill	Democratic	March 4, 1909 – March 3, 1911	11th	Elected in 1908. Lost re-election to Catlin.
Patrick F. Gill	Democratic	August 12, 1912 – March 3, 1913	11th	Won contested election. Lost renomination to Igoe.
John Milton Glover	Democratic	March 4, 1885 – March 3, 1889	9th	Elected in 1884. Retired to run for governor.
John Montgomery Glover	Democratic	March 4, 1877 – March 3, 1879	12th	Elected in 1872. Lost renomination to Hatch.
Joseph J. Gravely	Republican	March 4, 1867 – March 3, 1869	4th	Elected in 1866. Retired.
Alexander Graves	Democratic	March 4, 1883 – March 3, 1885	5th	Elected in 1882. Lost re-election to Warner.
Sam Graves	Republican	January 3, 2001 – present	6th	Elected in 2000. Incumbent.
James S. Green	Democratic	March 4, 1847 – March 3, 1851	3rd	Elected in 1846. Retired.
Thomas Hackney	Democratic	March 4, 1907 – March 3, 1909	15th	Elected in 1906. Lost re-election to Morgan.
John Blackwell Hale	Democratic	March 4, 1885 – March 4, 1887	2nd	Elected in 1884. Lost renomination to Mansur and lost re-election as an Independent.
Durward Gorham Hall	Republican	January 3, 1961 – January 3, 1973	7th	Elected in 1960. Retired.
Uriel Sebree Hall	Democratic	March 4, 1893 – March 3, 1897	2nd	Elected in 1892. Retired.
Willard Preble Hall	Democratic	March 4, 1847 – March 3, 1853	4th	Elected in 1846. Retired.
William Augustus Hall	Democratic	January 20, 1862 – March 3, 1863	3rd	Elected to finish Clark's term. Redistricted to the 8th district.
William Augustus Hall	Unionist	March 4, 1863 – March 3, 1865	8th	Redistricted from the 3rd district and re-elected in 1862. Retired.
Thomas Jefferson Halsey	Republican	March 4, 1929 – March 3, 1931	6th	Elected in 1928; Lost re-election to Dickinson.
Courtney W. Hamlin	Democratic	March 4, 1903 – March 3, 1905	7th	Elected in 1902. Lost re-election to Welborn.
Courtney W. Hamlin	Democratic	March 4, 1907 – March 3, 1919	7th	Elected in 1906. Lost renomination to Major.
Mel Hancock	Republican	January 3, 1989 – January 3, 1997	7th	Elected in 1988. Retired.
Albert Galliton Harrison	Jacksonian	March 4, 1835 – March 3, 1837	At-large	Elected in 1835. Switched parties.
Albert Galliton Harrison	Democratic	March 4, 1837 – September 7, 1839	At-large	Re-elected in 1836 as a Democrat. Died.
Vicky Hartzler	Republican	January 3, 2011 – January 3, 2023	4th	Elected in 2010. Retired to run for senator.
William H. Hatch	Democratic	March 4, 1879 – March 3, 1883	12th	Elected in 1878. Redistricted to the 1st district.
William H. Hatch	Democratic	March 4, 1883 – March 3, 1895	1st	Redistricted from the 12th district and re-elected in 1882. Lost re-election to C.N. Clark.
Robert Anthony Hatcher	Democratic	March 4, 1873 – March 3, 1879	4th	Elected in 1872. Retired.
Harrison E. Havens	Republican	March 4, 1871 – March 3, 1873	4th	Elected in 1870. Redistricted to the 6th district.
Harrison E. Havens	Republican	March 4, 1873 – March 3, 1875	6th	Redistricted from the 4th district and re-elected in 1872. Lost re-election to Morgan.
Harry B. Hawes	Democratic	March 4, 1921 – October 15, 1926	11th	Elected in 1920. Resigned to run for U.S. senator.
Edward D. Hays	Republican	March 4, 1919 – March 3, 1923	14th	Elected in 1918. Lost re-election to Fulbright.
Ira S. Haseltine	Greenback	March 4, 1881 – March 3, 1883	6th	Elected in 1880. Lost re-election to Cosgrove.
John T. Heard	Democratic	March 4, 1885 – March 3, 1893	6th	Elected in 1884. Redistricted to the 7th district.
John T. Heard	Democratic	March 4, 1893 – March 3, 1895	7th	Redistricted from the 6th district and re-elected in 1892. Lost re-election to Tracey.
Edward Hempstead	None	November 9, 1812 – September 17, 1814	Territory	Elected in 1812. Retired.
Thomas C. Hennings Jr.	Democratic	January 3, 1935 – December 31, 1940	11th	Elected in 1934. Retired and resigned early to become a candidate for circuit attorney of St. Louis.
Walter Lewis Hensley	Democratic	March 4, 1911 – March 3, 1919	13th	Elected in 1910. Retired.
Jeffrey Paul Hillelson	Republican	January 3, 1953 – January 3, 1955	4th	Elected in 1952. Lost re-election to Christopher.
John Hogan	Democratic	March 4, 1865 – March 3, 1867	1st	Elected in 1864. Lost re-election to Pile.
David W. Hopkins	Republican	February 5, 1929 – March 3, 1933	4th	Elected to finish Faust's term. Redistricted to at-large and lost re-election to 13 Democrats.
Joan Kelly Horn	Democratic	January 3, 1991 – January 3, 1993	2nd	Elected in 1990. Lost re-election to Talent.
Joel Douglas Hubbard	Republican	March 4, 1895 – March 3, 1897	8th	Elected in 1894. Lost re-election to Bland.
James Madison Hughes	Democratic	March 4, 1843 – March 3, 1845	At-large	Elected in 1842. Retired.
Theodore W. Hukriede	Republican	March 4, 1921 – March 3, 1923	9th	Elected in 1920. Lost re-election to Cannon.
William Raleigh Hull Jr.	Democratic	January 3, 1955 – January 3, 1973	6th	Elected in 1954. Retired.
Kenny Hulshof	Republican	January 3, 1997 – January 3, 2009	9th	Elected in 1996. Retired to run for governor.
William L. Hungate	Democratic	November 3, 1964 – January 3, 1977	9th	Elected to finish Cannon's term. Retired.
John T. Hunt	Democratic	March 4, 1903 – March 3, 1907	11th	Elected in 1902. Lost re-election to Caulfield.
John E. Hutton	Democratic	March 4, 1885 – March 3, 1889	7th	Elected in 1884. Retired.
Ira B. Hyde	Republican	March 4, 1873 – March 3, 1875	10th	Elected in 1872. Lost re-election to De Bolt.
Richard Howard Ichord Jr.	Democratic	January 3, 1961 – January 3, 1981	8th	Elected in 1960. Retired.
William L. Igoe	Democratic	March 4, 1913 – March 3, 1921	11th	Elected in 1912. Retired.
Leonard Irving	Democratic	January 3, 1949 – January 3, 1953	4th	Elected in 1948. Lost re-election to Hillelson.
Anthony F. Ittner	Republican	March 4, 1877 – March 3, 1879	1st	Elected in 1876. Retired.
John Jameson	Democratic	December 12, 1839 – March 3, 1841	At-large	Elected to finish Harrison's term. Retired.
John Jameson	Democratic	March 4, 1843 – March 3, 1845	At-large	Elected in 1842. Retired.
John Jameson	Democratic	March 4, 1847 – March 3, 1849	1st	Elected in 1846. Retired.
Robert Davis Johnson	Democratic	September 29, 1931 – March 3, 1933	7th	Elected to finish Major's term. Redistricted to at-large and lost renomination to 13 others.
Rowland Louis Johnston	Republican	March 4, 1929 – March 3, 1931	16th	Elected in 1928; Lost re-election to Barton.
Paul C. Jones	Democratic	November 2, 1948 – January 3, 1969	10th	Elected to finish Zimmerman's term. Retired.
Henry L. Jost	Democratic	March 4, 1923 – March 3, 1925	5th	Elected in 1922. Retired.
Charles Frederick Joy	Republican	March 4, 1893 – April 3, 1894	11th	Elected in 1892. Lost contested election to O'Neill.
Charles Frederick Joy	Republican	March 4, 1895 – March 3, 1903	11th	Elected in 1894. Lost renomination.
Raymond W. Karst	Democratic	January 3, 1949 – January 3, 1951	12th	Elected in 1948. Lost re-election to Curtis.
Frank M. Karsten	Democratic	January 3, 1947 – January 3, 1953	13th	Elected in 1946. Redistricted to the 1st district.
Frank M. Karsten	Democratic	January 3, 1953 – January 3, 1969	1st	Redistricted from the 13th district and re-elected in 1952. Retired.
Edward C. Kehr	Democratic	March 4, 1875 – March 3, 1877	1st	Elected in 1874. Lost re-election to Ittner.
John R. Kelso	Independent Republican	March 4, 1865 – March 3, 1867	4th	Elected in 1864. Retired.
Luther Martin Kennett	Whig	March 4, 1855 – March 3, 1857	1st	Elected in 1854. Lost re-election to F. Blair.
Charles Edward Kiefner	Republican	March 4, 1925 – March 3, 1927	13th	Elected in 1924. Lost re-election to Williams.
Charles Edward Kiefner	Republican	March 4, 1929 – March 3, 1931	13th	Elected in 1928. Lost re-election to Williams.
Andrew King	Democratic	March 4, 1871 – March 3, 1873	9th	Elected in 1870. Retired.
Austin Augustus King	Unionist	March 4, 1863 – March 3, 1865	6th	Elected in 1862. Lost re-election to Van Horn.
William Medcalf Kinsey	Republican	March 4, 1889 – March 3, 1891	10th	Elected in 1888. Lost re-election to Byrns.
Frank B. Klepper	Republican	March 4, 1905 – March 3, 1907	3rd	Elected in 1904. Lost re-election to J.W. Alexander.
Samuel Knox	Unionist	June 10, 1864 – March 3, 1865	1st	Won contested election. Lost re-election to Hogan.
J. Robert Lamar	Democratic	March 4, 1903 – March 3, 1905	16th	Elected in 1902. Lost re-election to Murphy.
J. Robert Lamar	Democratic	March 4, 1907 – March 3, 1909	16th	Elected in 1906. Lost re-election to Murphy.
Alfred William Lamb	Democratic	March 4, 1853 – March 3, 1855	2nd	Elected in 1852. Retired.
Henry F. Lawrence	Republican	March 4, 1921 – March 3, 1923	3rd	Elected in 1920. Lost re-election to Milligan.
Alfred Morrison Lay	Democratic	March 4, 1879 – December 8, 1879	7th	Elected in 1878. Died.
Frank H. Lee	Democratic	March 4, 1933 – January 3, 1935	At-large	Elected in 1932. Redistricted to the 7th district and lost re-election to Short.
James Johnson Lindley	Whig	March 4, 1853 – March 3, 1855	3rd	Elected in 1852. Switched parties.
James Johnson Lindley	Opposition	March 4, 1855 – March 3, 1857	3rd	Re-elected in 1854 as and Opposition party candidate. Retired.
Jerry Litton	Democratic	January 3, 1973 – August 3, 1976	6th	Elected in 1972. Died in airplane crash while nominee for U.S. Senator.
James Tilghman Lloyd	Democratic	June 1, 1897 – March 3, 1917	1st	Elected after the death of member-elect Richard P. Giles. Retired.
Benjamin F. Loan	Unionist	March 4, 1863 – March 3, 1865	7th	Elected in 1862. Switched parties.
Benjamin F. Loan	Republican	March 4, 1865 – March 3, 1869	7th	Re-elected in 1864 as a Republican. Lost re-election to Asper.
Billy Long	Republican	January 3, 2011 – January 3, 2023	7th	Elected in 2010. Retired to run for senator.
Ralph F. Lozier	Democratic	March 4, 1923 – March 3, 1933	2nd	Elected in 1922. Redistricted to the at-large district.
Ralph F. Lozier	Democratic	March 4, 1933 – January 3, 1935	At-large	Redistricted from the 2nd district and re-elected in 1932. Redistricted to the 2nd district and lost renomination to Nelson.
Blaine Luetkemeyer	Republican	January 3, 2009 – January 3, 2013	9th	Elected in 2008. Redistricted to the 3rd district.
Blaine Luetkemeyer	Republican	January 3, 2013 – January 3, 2025	3rd	Redistricted from the 9th district and re-elected in 2012. Retired.
Clare Magee	Democratic	January 3, 1949 – January 3, 1953	1st	Elected in 1948. Retired.
Samuel C. Major	Democratic	March 4, 1919 – March 3, 1921	7th	Elected in 1918. Lost re-election to Patterson.
Samuel C. Major	Democratic	March 4, 1923 – March 3, 1929	7th	Elected in 1922. Lost re-election to Palmer.
Samuel C. Major	Democratic	March 4, 1931 – July 28, 1931	7th	Elected in 1930. Died.
Joe J. Manlove	Republican	March 4, 1923 – March 3, 1933	15th	Elected in 1922. Redistricted to At-large district and lost re-election to 13 Democrats.
Charles H. Mansur	Democratic	March 4, 1887 – March 3, 1893	2nd	Elected in 1886. Lost renomination to U. Hall.
Karen McCarthy	Democratic	January 3, 1995 – January 3, 2005	5th	Elected in 1994. Retired.
Joseph W. McClurg	Unconditional Unionist	March 4, 1863 – March 3, 1865	5th	Elected in 1862. Switched parties.
Joseph W. McClurg	Republican	March 4, 1865 – ??, 1868	5th	Re-elected in 1864 as a Republican. Resigned when elected Governor of Missouri.
James Robinson McCormick	Democratic	December 17, 1867 – March 3, 1873	3rd	Elected to finish T. Noell's term. Retired.
William McDaniel	Democratic	December 7, 1846 – March 3, 1847	At-large	Elected to finish Price's term. Retired.
James Henry McLean	Republican	December 15, 1882 – March 3, 1883	2nd	Elected to finish Allen's term. Redistricted to the 9th district and lost election to Broadhead.
Isaac V. McPherson	Republican	March 4, 1919 – March 3, 1923	15th	Elected in 1918. Lost renomination to Manlove.
Jacob Edwin Meeker	Republican	March 4, 1915 – October 16, 1918	10th	Re-elected in 1914. Died.
Lyne Metcalfe	Republican	March 4, 1877 – March 3, 1879	3rd	Elected in 1876. Lost re-election to Frost.
John Miller	Democratic	March 4, 1837 – March 3, 1843	At-large	Elected in 1836. Retired.
John Gaines Miller	Whig	March 4, 1851 – March 3, 1853	3rd	Elected in 1850. Redistricted to the 5th district.
John Gaines Miller	Whig	March 4, 1853 – March 3, 1855	5th	Redistricted from the 3rd district and re-elected in 1852. Switched parties.
John Gaines Miller	Opposition	March 4, 1855 – May 11, 1856	5th	Re-elected in 1854 as an Opposition party candidate. Died.
Louis E. Miller	Republican	January 3, 1943 – January 3, 1945	11th	Elected in 1942. Lost re-election to Sullivan.
Jacob L. Milligan	Democratic	February 14, 1920 – March 3, 1921	3rd	Elected to finish Alexander's term. Lost re-election to Lawrence.
Jacob L. Milligan	Democratic	March 4, 1923 – March 3, 1933	3rd	Elected in 1922. Redistricted to the at-large district.
Jacob L. Milligan	Democratic	March 4, 1933 – January 3, 1935	At-large	Redistricted from the 3rd district and re-elected in 1932. Retired to run for U.S. senator.
Frank C. Millspaugh	Republican	March 4, 1921 – December 5, 1922	1st	Elected in 1920. Lost re-election and resigned early.
Charles Henry Morgan	Democratic	March 4, 1875 – March 3, 1879	6th	Elected in 1874. Lost re-election to Waddill.
Charles Henry Morgan	Democratic	March 4, 1883 – March 3, 1885	12th	Elected in 1882. Lost re-election to Stone.
Charles Henry Morgan	Democratic	March 4, 1893 – March 3, 1895	15th	Elected in 1892. Lost renomination.
Charles Henry Morgan	Republican	March 4, 1909 – March 3, 1911	15th	Elected in 1908. Lost re-election to Daugherty.
Morgan M. Moulder	Democratic	January 3, 1949 – January 3, 1953	2nd	Elected in 1948. Redistricted to the 11th district.
Morgan M. Moulder	Democratic	January 3, 1953 – January 3, 1963	11th	Redistricted from the 2nd district and re-elected in 1952. Retired.
Norman Adolphus Mozley	Republican	March 4, 1895 – March 3, 1897	14th	Elected in 1894. Retired.
Arthur P. Murphy	Republican	March 4, 1905 – March 3, 1907	16th	Elected in 1904. Lost re-election to Lamar.
Arthur P. Murphy	Republican	March 4, 1909 – March 3, 1911	16th	Elected in 1908. Lost re-election to Rubey.
William L. Nelson	Democratic	March 4, 1919 – March 3, 1921	8th	Elected in 1918. Lost re-election to Roach.
William L. Nelson	Democratic	March 4, 1925 – March 3, 1933	8th	Elected in 1924. Redistricted to the at-large district and lost renomination.
William L. Nelson	Democratic	January 3, 1935 – January 3, 1943	2nd	Elected in 1934. Lost re-election to Schwabe.
Carman A. Newcomb	Republican	March 4, 1867 – March 3, 1869	2nd	Elected in 1866. Retired.
Cleveland A. Newton	Republican	March 4, 1919 – March 3, 1927	10th	Elected in 1918. Retired.
Frederick G. Niedringhaus	Republican	March 4, 1889 – March 3, 1891	8th	Elected in 1888. Retired.
Henry F. Niedringhaus	Republican	March 4, 1927 – March 3, 1933	10th	Elected in 1926. Redistricted to the At-large district and lost re-election to 13 Democrats.
John William Noell	Democratic	March 4, 1859 – March 3, 1863	7th	Elected in 1858. Redistricted to the 3rd district.
John William Noell	Unionist	March 4, 1863 – March 14, 1863	3rd	Redistricted from the 7th district and Re-elected in 1862. Died.
Thomas E. Noell	Republican	March 4, 1865 – March 3, 1867	3rd	Elected in 1864. Switched parties.
Thomas E. Noell	Democratic	March 4, 1867 – October 3, 1867	3rd	Re-elected in 1866 as a Democrat. Died.
Elijah Hise Norton	Democratic	March 4, 1861 – March 3, 1863	4th	Elected in 1860. Lost re-election to Boyd.
Richard Henry Norton	Democratic	March 4, 1889 – March 3, 1893	7th	Elected in 1888. Lost re-election to Heard.
Mordecai Oliver	Whig	March 4, 1853 – March 3, 1855	4th	Elected in 1852. Switched parties.
Mordecai Oliver	Opposition	March 4, 1855 – March 3, 1857	4th	Re-elected in 1854 as an Opposition party candidate. Retired.
Bob Onder	Republican	January 3, 2025 – present	3rd	Elected in 2024. Incumbent.
John Joseph O'Neill	Democratic	March 4, 1883 – March 3, 1889	8th	Elected in 1882. Lost re-election to F. Niedringhaus.
John Joseph O'Neill	Democratic	March 4, 1891 – March 3, 1893	8th	Elected in 1890. Redistricted to 11th district and lost re-election to Joy.
John Joseph O'Neill	Democratic	April 3, 1894 – March 3, 1895	11th	Won contested election. Retired.
John William Palmer	Republican	March 4, 1929 – March 3, 1931	7th	Elected in 1928. Lost re-election to Major.
Isaac C. Parker	Republican	March 4, 1871 – March 3, 1873	7th	Elected in 1870. Redistricted to the 9th district.
Isaac C. Parker	Republican	March 4, 1873 – March 3, 1875	9th	Redistricted from the 7th district and re-elected in 1872. Retired.
Roscoe C. Patterson	Republican	March 4, 1921 – March 3, 1923	7th	Elected in 1920. Lost re-election to Major.
Charles Edward Pearce	Republican	March 4, 1897 – March 3, 1901	12th	Elected in 1896. Retired.
Spencer Darwin Pettis	Jacksonian	March 4, 1829 – August 28, 1831	At-large	Elected in 1828. Died.
John S. Phelps	Democratic	March 4, 1845 – March 3, 1847	At-large	Elected in 1844. Redistricted to the 5th district.
John S. Phelps	Democratic	March 4, 1847 – March 3, 1853	5th	Redistricted from the at-large district and re-elected in 1846. Redistricted to the 6th district.
John S. Phelps	Democratic	March 4, 1853 – March 3, 1863	6th	Redistricted from the 5th district and re-elected in 1852. Retired.
John Finis Philips	Democratic	March 4, 1875 – March 3, 1877	7th	Elected in 1874. Lost re-election to Crittenden.
John Finis Philips	Democratic	January 10, 1880 – March 3, 1881	7th	Elected to finish Lay's term. Lost re-election to Rice.
William A. Pile	Republican	March 4, 1867 – March 3, 1869	1st	Elected in 1866. Lost re-election to Wells.
Walter C. Ploeser	Republican	January 3, 1941 – January 3, 1949	12th	Elected in 1940. Lost re-election to Karst.
Henry Moses Pollard	Republican	March 4, 1877 – March 3, 1879	10th	Elected in 1876. Lost re-election to Rothwell.
Gilchrist Porter	Whig	March 4, 1851 – March 3, 1853	2nd	Elected in 1850. Lost re-election to Lamb.
Gilchrist Porter	Opposition	March 4, 1855 – March 3, 1857	2nd	Elected in 1854. Retired.
Sterling Price	Democratic	March 4, 1845 – August 12, 1846	At-large	Elected in 1844. Resigned to serve in the Mexican–American War.
Thomas Lawson Price	Democratic	January 21, 1862 – March 4, 1863	5th	Elected to finish Reid's term. Lost re-election to McClurg.
William J. Randall	Democratic	March 3, 1959 – January 3, 1977	4th	Elected to finish Christopher's term. Retired.
John Henry Raney	Republican	March 4, 1895 – March 3, 1897	13th	Elected in 1894. Lost re-election to Robb.
David Rea	Democratic	March 4, 1875 – March 3, 1879	9th	Elected in 1874. Lost re-election to Ford.
Albert L. Reeves Jr.	Republican	January 3, 1947 – January 3, 1949	5th	Elected in 1946. Lost re-election to Bolling.
John William Reid	Democratic	March 4, 1861 – August 3, 1861	5th	Elected in 1860. Expelled for taking up arms against the Union.
James Hugh Relfe	Democratic	March 4, 1843 – March 3, 1847	At-large	Elected in 1842. Retired.
Marion E. Rhodes	Republican	March 4, 1905 – March 3, 1907	13th	Elected in 1904. Lost re-election to M. Smith.
Marion E. Rhodes	Republican	March 4, 1919 – March 3, 1923	13th	Elected in 1918. Lost re-election to Wolff.
Theron Moses Rice	Greenback	March 4, 1881 – March 3, 1883	7th	Elected in 1880. Retired.
Sidney C. Roach	Republican	March 4, 1921 – March 3, 1925	8th	Elected in 1920. Lost re-election to Nelson.
Edward Robb	Democratic	March 4, 1897 – March 3, 1905	13th	Elected in 1896. Lost re-election to Rhodes.
James S. Rollins	Constitutional Unionist	March 4, 1861 – March 3, 1863	2nd	Elected in 1860. Redistricted to the 9th district.
James S. Rollins	Unionist	March 4, 1863 – March 3, 1865	9th	Redistricted from the 2nd district and re-elected in 1862.
Milton A. Romjue	Democratic	March 4, 1917 – March 3, 1921	1st	Elected in 1916. Lost re-election to Millspaugh.
Milton A. Romjue	Democratic	March 4, 1923 – March 3, 1933	1st	Elected in 1922. Redistricted to the at-large district.
Milton A. Romjue	Democratic	March 4, 1933 – January 3, 1935	At-large	Redistricted from the 1st district and re-elected in 1932. Redistricted to the 1st district.
Milton A. Romjue	Democratic	January 3, 1935 – January 3, 1943	1st	Redistricted from the at-large district and re-elected in 1934. Lost re-election to S. Arnold.
Gideon Frank Rothwell	Democratic	March 4, 1879 – March 3, 1881	10th	Elected in 1878. Lost renomination.
Thomas L. Rubey	Democratic	March 4, 1911 – March 3, 1921	16th	Elected in 1910. Lost re-election to Shelton.
Thomas L. Rubey	Democratic	March 4, 1923 – November 2, 1928	16th	Elected in 1922. Died.
William W. Rucker	Democratic	March 4, 1899 – March 3, 1923	9th	Elected in 1898. Lost renomination to Lozier.
James Edward Ruffin	Democratic	March 4, 1933 – January 3, 1935	At-large	Elected in 1932. Redistricted to the 3rd district and lost renomination to Duncan.
Joseph J. Russell	Democratic	March 4, 1907 – March 3, 1909	14th	Elected in 1906. Lost re-election to Crow.
Joseph J. Russell	Democratic	March 4, 1911 – March 3, 1919	14th	Elected in 1910. Retired.
Samuel Locke Sawyer	Independent Democratic	March 4, 1879 – March 3, 1881	8th	Elected in 1878. Retired.
Max Schwabe	Republican	January 3, 1943 – January 3, 1949	2nd	Elected in 1942. Lost re-election to Moulder.
John Scott	None	August 6, 1816 – January 13, 1817	Territory	Elected in 1816. Election declared illegal and seat vacated.
John Scott	None	August 4, 1817 – March 3, 1821	Territory	Elected to finish his own term. Redistricted to at-large district upon statehood
John Scott	Democratic-Republican	August 10, 1821 – March 3, 1825	At-large	Elected in 1820. Switched parties.
John Scott	Anti-Jacksonian	March 4, 1825 – March 3, 1827	At-large	Re-elected in 1824 as an Anti-Jacksonian. Lost re-election to Bates.
John Guier Scott	Democratic	December 7, 1863 – March 3, 1865	3rd	Elected to finish J. Noell's term. Retired.
Gustavus Sessinghaus	Republican	March 2, 1883 – March 4, 1883	3rd	Won contested election. Lost re-election.
Dorsey W. Shackleford	Democratic	August 29, 1899 – March 3, 1919	8th	Elected to finish Bland's term. Lost renomination to Nelson.
Joe Shannon	Democratic	March 4, 1931 – March 3, 1933	5th	Elected in 1930. Redistricted to the at-large district.
Joe Shannon	Democratic	March 4, 1933 – January 3, 1935	At-large	Redistricted from the 5th district and re-elected in 1932. Redistricted to the 5th district.
Joe Shannon	Democratic	January 3, 1935 – January 3, 1943	5th	Redistricted from the at-large district and re-elected in 1934. Retired.
Cassius M. Shartel	Republican	March 4, 1905 – March 3, 1907	15th	Elected in 1904. Retired.
Samuel A. Shelton	Republican	March 4, 1921 – March 3, 1923	16th	Elected in 1920. Retired.Retired.
Dewey Jackson Short	Republican	March 4, 1929 – March 3, 1931	14th	Elected in 1928; Lost re-election to Fulbright.
Dewey Jackson Short	Republican	January 3, 1935 – January 3, 1957	7th	Elected in 1934. Lost re-election to Brown.
Leonard Henly Sims	Democratic	March 4, 1845 – March 3, 1847	At-large	Elected in 1844. Retired.
Ike Skelton	Democratic	January 3, 1977 – January 3, 2011	4th	Elected in 1976. Lost re-election to Hartzler.
Roger C. Slaughter	Democratic	January 3, 1943 – January 3, 1947	5th	Elected in 1942. Lost renomination to Enos A. Axtell.
Jason T. Smith	Republican	June 4, 2013 – present	8th	Elected to finish Emerson's term. Incumbent.
Madison Roswell Smith	Democratic	March 4, 1907 – March 3, 1909	13th	Elected in 1906. Lost re-election to Elvins.
Edwin O. Stanard	Republican	March 4, 1873 – March 3, 1875	1st	Elected in 1872. Lost re-election to Kehr.
William Henry Stone	Democratic	March 4, 1873 – March 3, 1877	3rd	Elected in 1872. Retired.
William Joel Stone	Democratic	March 4, 1885 – March 3, 1891	12th	Elected in 1884. Retired.
John Hubler Stover	Republican	December 7, 1868 – March 3, 1869	5th	Elected to finish McClurg's term. Retired.
John B. Sullivan	Democratic	January 3, 1941 – January 3, 1943	11th	Elected in 1940. Lost re-election to L. Miller.
John B. Sullivan	Democratic	January 3, 1945 – January 3, 1947	11th	Elected in 1944. Lost re-election to Bakewell.
John B. Sullivan	Democratic	January 3, 1949 – January 29, 1951	11th	Elected in 1948. Died.
Leonor Sullivan	Democratic	January 3, 1953 – January 3, 1977	3rd	Elected in 1952. Retired.
James W. Symington	Democratic	January 3, 1969 – January 3, 1977	2nd	Elected in 1968. Retired to run for U.S. senator.
Jim Talent	Republican	January 3, 1993 – January 3, 2001	2nd	Elected in 1992. Retired to run for governor.
Gene Taylor	Republican	January 3, 1973 – January 3, 1989	7th	Elected in 1972. Retired.
John Charles Tarsney	Democratic	March 4, 1889 – February 27, 1896	5th	Elected in 1888. Lost contested election to Van Horn.
John Plank Tracey	Republican	March 4, 1895 – March 3, 1897	7th	Elected in 1894. Lost re-election to Cooney.
William M. Treloar	Republican	March 4, 1895 – March 3, 1897	9th	Elected in 1894. Lost re-election to C. Clark.
William T. Tyndall	Republican	March 4, 1905 – March 3, 1907	14th	Elected in 1904. Lost re-election to Russell.
Robert T. Van Horn	Republican	March 4, 1865 – March 3, 1871	6th	Elected in 1864. Retired.
Robert T. Van Horn	Republican	March 4, 1881 – March 3, 1883	8th	Elected in 1880. Lost re-election to O'Neill.
Robert T. Van Horn	Republican	February 27, 1896 – March 3, 1897	5th	Won contested election. Lost renomination.
Willard Duncan Vandiver	Democratic	March 4, 1897 – March 3, 1905	14th	Elected in 1896. Retired.
Harold Volkmer	Democratic	January 3, 1977 – January 3, 1997	9th	Elected in 1976. Lost re-election to Hulshof.
James Richard Waddill	Democratic	March 4, 1879 – March 3, 1881	6th	Elected in 1878. Retired.
William H. Wade	Republican	March 4, 1885 – March 3, 1891	13th	Elected in 1884. Lost re-election to Fyan.
Ann Wagner	Republican	January 3, 2013 – present	2nd	Elected in 2012. Incumbent.
George Chester Robinson Wagoner	Republican	February 26, 1903 – March 4, 1903	12th	Won election contest. Retired.
James P. Walker	Democratic	March 4, 1887 – July 19, 1890	14th	Elected in 1886. Died.
William Warner	Republican	March 4, 1885 – March 3, 1889	5th	Elected in 1884. Retired.
John Welborn	Republican	March 4, 1905 – March 3, 1907	7th	Elected in 1904. Lost re-election to Hamlin.
Phil J. Welch	Democratic	January 3, 1949 – January 3, 1953	3rd	Elected in 1948. Retired to run for governor.
Erastus Wells	Democratic	March 4, 1869 – March 3, 1873	1st	Elected in 1868. Redistricted to the 2nd district.
Erastus Wells	Democratic	March 4, 1873 – March 3, 1877	2nd	Redistricted from the 1st district and re-elected in 1872. Lost re-election to Cole.
Erastus Wells	Democratic	March 4, 1879 – March 3, 1881	2nd	Elected in 1878. Retired.
Alan Wheat	Democratic	January 3, 1983 – January 3, 1995	5th	Elected in 1982. Retired to run for U.S. Senator.
Robert Henry Whitelaw	Democratic	November 4, 1890 – March 3, 1891	14th	Elected to finish Walker's term. Retired.
Clyde Williams	Democratic	March 4, 1927 – March 3, 1929	13th	Elected in 1926. Lost re-election to Kiefner.
Clyde Williams	Democratic	March 4, 1931 – March 3, 1933	13th	Elected in 1930. Redistricted to the at-large district.
Clyde Williams	Democratic	March 4, 1933 – January 3, 1935	At-large	Redistricted from the 13th district and re-elected in 1932. Redistricted to the 8th district.
Clyde Williams	Democratic	January 3, 1935 – January 3, 1943	8th	Redistricted from the At-large district and re-elected in 1934. Lost re-election to Elmer.
Robert Patterson Clark Wilson	Democratic	December 2, 1889 – March 3, 1893	4th	Elected to finish Burnes's term in the 51st Congress. Retired.
J. Scott Wolff	Democratic	March 4, 1923 – March 3, 1925	13th	Elected in 1922. Lost re-election to Kiefner.
Ernest E. Wood	Democratic	March 4, 1905 – June 23, 1906	12th	Elected in 1904. Lost election contest to Coudrey.
Reuben T. Wood	Democratic	March 4, 1933 – January 3, 1935	At-large	Elected in 1932. Redistricted to the 6th district.
Reuben T. Wood	Democratic	January 3, 1935 – January 3, 1941	6th	Redistricted from the At-large district and re-elected in 1934. Lost re-election to P. Bennett.
Samuel H. Woodson	Know Nothing	March 4, 1857 – March 3, 1861	5th	Elected in 1856. Retired.
Robert A. Young	Democratic	January 3, 1977 – January 3, 1987	2nd	Elected in 1976. Lost re-election to Buechner.
Orville Zimmerman	Democratic	January 3, 1935 – April 7, 1948	10th	Elected in 1934. Died.

== See also ==
- List of United States senators from Missouri
- Missouri's congressional delegations
- Missouri's congressional districts
