= 1846–47 United States House of Representatives elections =

House elections for the 30th U.S. Congress

- August 2, 1846 – November 2, 1847 (Note: Excludes states admitted during the 30th Congress.)

All 228 seats in the United States House of Representatives 116 seats needed for a majority
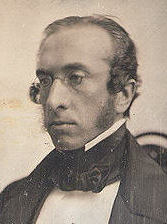

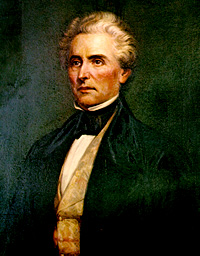
	Majority party	Minority party
Leader	Robert Winthrop	Linn Boyd
Party	Whig	Democratic
Leader's seat	Massachusetts 1st	Kentucky 1st
Last election	79 seats	142 seats
Seats won	116	108 (Note: Includes two congressmen elected as "Locofoco Democrat": Robert W. Johnson from Arkansas's at-large congressional district and William Collins from the 18th District of New York.)
Seat change	▲37	▼34
Popular vote	1,014,465	1,097,101
Percentage	44.72%	48.36%
Swing	▼0.27 pp	▼1.74 pp
	Third party	Fourth party
Party	Know Nothing	Independent
Last election	6 seats	0 seats
Seats won	1	3 (Note: Includes two Independent Democrats.)
Seat change	▼5	▲3
Popular vote	28,469	47,324
Percentage	1.26%	2.09%
Swing	▼0.84 pp	▲1.56 pp
- Results: Democratic hold Democratic gain Whig hold Whig gain Independent gain Know Nothing hold
Speaker before election
John Davis
Democratic
Elected Speaker
Robert Winthrop
Whig

States held the 1846–47 United States House of Representatives elections between August 2, 1846, and November 2, 1847, during President James K. Polk's term. Each state set a date for its elections to the House of Representatives. From 29 states, 228 elected Representatives were seated, including the first from the new U. S. states of Iowa and Texas, when the first session of the 30th United States Congress convened on December 6, 1847.

The Whigs won a change in partisan control of the House from the rival Democrats. (Note: Martis includes the Independent Democrat from Illinois's 1st congressional district and the Independent from New York's 17th congressional district toward the Democratic total, for 110 members at the start of the 30th Congress. See: Martis, p. 100–101.) The Whigs gained seats in the Mid-Atlantic and Southern states. Representatives of the minor, nativist Know Nothing Party and independents won a few seats.

The Mexican–American War, which the incumbent House had voted overwhelmingly to approve, was the main issue. The war had much stronger voter support in the West, South, and among Democrats than in the East, North, and among Whigs. Voters widely, accurately believed that the United States would win the war relatively easily and would make large territorial gains. Anticipating victory, Representative David Wilmot, Democrat of Pennsylvania, proposed that Congress act to ban slavery in these projected new territories. Congress ultimately rejected the Wilmot Proviso, but not quickly, smoothly, or without significant public controversy. Protracted debate aggravated sectional tensions. The repeated failure of Congress, and later also the President and Supreme Court, over the next decade to definitively resolve the issue of slavery in the territories would become a major cause of the Civil War.

This was the last time the Whig Party won a House majority, though candidates opposed to the Democratic Party would win a large majority in the realigning 1854 election. Notable freshmen included Abraham Lincoln of Illinois, elected as a Whig to his only term.

== Election summaries ==
The trend toward single-member districts culminated, as no multi-member districts featured.

In 1845, partly motivated by the successful 1844 test of the electric telegraph between Washington and Baltimore, a major technological change enabling news and information to be transmitted almost instantaneously regardless of distance, Congress established a uniform date for choosing Presidential electors. Gradually, states would align nearly all elections with this date, though as of this election, only three states had done so.

Two House seats were added for the new state of Wisconsin, which was unrepresented for most of the first session.

↓
108	4	116
Democratic	(Note: 2 Independents, 1 Independent Democrat, and 1 Know Nothing.)	Whig

State	Type	Date	Total seats	Democratic		Whig		Other	
State	Type	Date	Total seats	Seats	Change	Seats	Change	Seats	Change
Elections for new states (Not included in totals below)
Texas	District	March 30, 1846	2	2	▲2	0	Steady	0	Steady
Iowa	At-large	October 26, 1846	2	2	▲2	0	Steady	0	Steady
General elections
Missouri	District (Note: Changed from at-large)	August 2, 1846	5	5	Steady	0	Steady	0	Steady
Arkansas	At-large	August 3, 1846	1	1 (Note: Robert W. Johnson was elected to AR-AL as a Locofoco Democrat.)	Steady	0	Steady	0	Steady
Illinois	District	August 3, 1846	7	4	▼1	1	Steady	1 (Note: Includes Robert Smith, who was elected to IL-01 as an Independent Democrat.)	▲1
Vermont	District	September 1, 1846	4	1	Steady	3	Steady	0	Steady
Maine	District	September 14, 1846	7	6	Steady	1	Steady	0	Steady
Florida	At-large	October 5, 1846	1	0	▼1	1	▲1	0	Steady
Georgia	District	October 5, 1846	8	4	▼1	4	▲1	0	Steady
South Carolina	District	October 12–13, 1846	7	7	Steady	0	Steady	0	Steady
Ohio	District	October 13, 1846	21	10	▼3	11	▲3	0	Steady
Pennsylvania	District	October 13, 1846	24	7	▼5	16	▲6	1 (Note: 1 Know Nothing)	▼1
Texas	District	November 2, 1846	2	2	Steady	0	Steady	0	Steady
Michigan	District	November 3, 1846 (Election Day)	3	3	Steady	0	Steady	0	Steady
New Jersey	District	November 3, 1846 (Election Day)	5	1	Steady	4	Steady	0	Steady
New York	District	November 3, 1846 (Election Day)	34	10	▼11	23	▲14	1 (Note: Includes George Petrie, who was elected to NY-17 as an Independent Democrat.)	▼3
Massachusetts	District	November 9, 1846	10	0	Steady	10	Steady	0	Steady
Delaware	At-large	November 10, 1846	1	0	Steady	1	Steady	0	Steady
Late elections (after the March 4, 1847 beginning of the term)
New Hampshire	District	March 9, 1847	4 (Note: One seat had been vacant during the entire 29th Congress.)	2	▼1	1	▲1	1 (Note: Amos Tuck was elected to NH-01 as an independent.)	▲1
Connecticut	District	April 5, 1847	4	0	Steady	4	Steady	0	Steady
Rhode Island	District	April 7, 1847	2	1	▲1	1	▼1	0	Steady
Virginia	District	April 22, 1847	15	9	▼5	6	▲5	0	Steady
Alabama	District	August 2, 1847	7	5	▼1	2	▲1	0	Steady
Indiana	District	August 2, 1847	10	6	▼2	4	▲2	0	Steady
Iowa	District	August 2, 1847	2	2	Steady	0	Steady	0	Steady
Kentucky	District	August 2, 1847	10	4	▲1	6	▼1	0	Steady
Tennessee	District	August 2, 1847	11	6	Steady	5	Steady	0	Steady
North Carolina	District	August 5, 1847	9	3	▼3	6	▲3	0	Steady
Maryland	District	October 6, 1847	6	2	▼2	4	▲2	0	Steady
Mississippi	District	November 1–2, 1847	4	3	▼1	1	▲1	0	Steady
Louisiana	District	November 2, 1847	4	3	Steady	1	Steady	0	Steady
Total (Note: Includes late elections)			228	108 47.4%	▼34	116 50.9%	▲37	4 1.8%	▼2

Popular vote
Democratic	48.43%
Independent	2.74%
Know Nothing	1.21%
Whig	44.52%
Others	3.10%

House seats
Democratic	47.36%
Independent	1.31%
Know Nothing	0.44%
Whig	50.88%

Shaded according to winners share of vote

== Special elections ==
=== 29th Congress ===
District	Incumbent			This race	
District	Member	Party	First elected	Results	Candidates
Georgia 3	Washington Poe	Whig	1844	Member-elect declined the seat. New member elected January 5, 1846. Democratic gain. Winner later lost re-election to the next term; see below.	▌ ✓ George W. Towns (Democratic) 51.6%; ▌Ambrose Baber (Whig) 48.4%
Louisiana 1	John Slidell	Democratic	1843	Incumbent resigned November 10, 1845. New member elected January 5, 1846. Democratic hold. Winner later re-elected to the next term; see below.	▌ ✓ Emile La Sére (Democratic) 78.2%; ▌John McHenry (Independent) 16.1%; ▌Thomas M. Wadsworth (Independent) 5.7%
Virginia 11	William Taylor	Democratic	1843	Incumbent died January 17, 1846. New member elected February 9, 1846. Democratic hold. Winner later re-elected to the next term; see below.	▌ ✓ James McDowell (Democratic); Unopposed
Alabama 3	William L. Yancey	Democratic	1844 (special)	Incumbent resigned September 1, 1846. New member elected October 12, 1846. Democratic hold. Winner was not a candidate for the next term; see below.	▌ ✓ James L. F. Cottrell (Democratic) 50.2%; ▌Samuel S. Beman (Whig) 49.8%
Missouri at-large 1 of 5 seats	Sterling Price	Democratic	1844	Incumbent resigned August 12, 1846, to serve in the Mexican–American War. New member elected October 31, 1846. Democratic hold. Winner was not a candidate for the next term; see below.	▌ ✓ William McDaniel (Democratic) 48.1%; ▌William M. Kincaid (Whig) 46.2%; ▌James W. Morgan (Unknown) 5.0%; ▌Edward M. Halden (Unknown) 0.7%
New York 12	Richard P. Herrick	Whig	1844	Incumbent died June 20, 1846. New member elected November 3, 1846. Whig hold. Winner not elected the same day to the next term; see below.	▌ ✓ Thomas C. Ripley (Whig) 50.8%; ▌Thomas W. Jones (Democratic) 48.2%; ▌Simeon E. Church (Liberty) 1.0%
Alabama 7	Felix G. McConnell	Democratic	1843	Incumbent died September 10, 1846. New member elected November 9, 1846. Democratic hold. Winner later re-elected to the next term; see below.	▌ ✓ Franklin W. Bowdon (Democratic) 45.2%; ▌Benjamin Goodman (Whig) 33.1%; ▌T. A. Walker (Democratic) 21.7%
Arkansas at-large	Archibald Yell	Democratic	1836; 1838 (retired); 1844	Incumbent resigned July 1, 1846, to serve in the United States Volunteers. New member elected December 14, 1846. Whig gain. Winner was not a candidate for the next term; see below.	▌ ✓ Thomas Willoughby Newton (Whig) 28.5%; ▌George W. Paschal (Democratic) 28.2%; ▌Albert Rust (Democratic) 27.1%; ▌C. F. Noland (Whig) 14.0%; ▌Herndon Haralson (Democratic) 2.2%
Mississippi at-large 1 of 4 seats	Jefferson Davis	Democratic	1845	Incumbent resigned October 28, 1846, to serve in the Mexican–American War. New member elected December 21–22, 1846. Democratic hold. Winner was not a candidate for the next term; see below.	▌ ✓ Henry T. Ellett (Democratic) 52.7%; ▌Peter Burwell Starke (Whig) 47.3%
Illinois 7	Edward D. Baker	Whig	1844	Incumbent resigned January 15, 1847 to join the Illinois Volunteer Infantry. New member elected January 20, 1847. Whig hold. Winner was not a candidate for the next term; see below.	▌ ✓ John Henry (Whig) 56.7%; ▌Israel W. Crosby (Democratic) 30.4%; ▌Archibald Job (Democratic) 6.9%; ▌Turner R. King (Independent) 2.9%; ▌William Brown (Whig) 1.9%; Scattering 1.2%

=== 30th Congress ===
District	Incumbent			This race	
District	Member	Party	First elected	Results	Candidates
Illinois 5	Stephen A. Douglas	Democratic	1842	Incumbent resigned March 3, 1847, after being elected to the U.S. Senate. New member elected August 2, 1847. Democratic hold. Winner later re-elected to the next term.	▌ ✓ William Alexander Richardson (Democratic) 77.5%; ▌Nathaniel G. Wilcox (Whig) 22.5%
Virginia 2	George Dromgoole	Democratic	1835; 1841 (retired); 1843	Incumbent died April 27, 1847. New member elected August 5, 1847. Democratic hold. Winner later re-elected to the next term.	▌ ✓ Richard Kidder Meade (Democratic) 53.9%; ▌George W. Bolling (Whig) 46.1%
Michigan 2	Edward Bradley	Democratic	1846	Incumbent died August 5, 1847. New member elected November 2, 1847. Democratic hold. Winner later lost re-election to the next term.	▌ ✓ Charles E. Stuart (Democratic) 52.2%; ▌James W. Gordon (Whig) 43.9%; ▌William C. Denison (Unknown) 3.9%
Ohio 7	Thomas L. Hamer	Democratic	1832; 1838 (retired); 1846	Incumbent died December 2, 1846. New member elected November 8, 1847. Democratic hold. Winner later re-elected to the next term.	▌ ✓ Jonathan D. Morris (Democratic) 94.1%; Scattering 5.9%

== Alabama ==
Elections were held August 2, 1847, after the March 4, 1847 beginning of the term, but before the House first convened in December 1847.

District	Incumbent			This race	
District	Member	Party	First elected	Results	Candidates
Alabama 1	Edmund S. Dargan	Democratic	1845	Incumbent retired. Whig gain.	▌ ✓ John Gayle (Whig) 52.9%; ▌John Taylor (Democratic) 47.1%
Alabama 2	Henry W. Hilliard	Whig	1845	Incumbent re-elected.	▌ ✓ Henry W. Hilliard (Whig); Unopposed
Alabama 3	James L. F. Cottrell	Democratic	1846 (special)	Incumbent retired. Democratic hold.	▌ ✓ Sampson Willis Harris (Democratic) 71.2%; ▌William S. Mead (Unknown) 20.0%; ▌Gideon P. Walker (Unknown) 8.8%
Alabama 4	William Winter Payne	Democratic	1843	Incumbent retired. Democratic hold.	▌ ✓ Samuel Williams Inge (Democratic) 50.9%; ▌W. M. Murphy (Whig) 49.1%
Alabama 5	George S. Houston	Democratic	1841	Incumbent re-elected.	▌ ✓ George S. Houston (Democratic) 60.5%; ▌David Hubbard (Democratic) 39.5%
Alabama 6	Reuben Chapman	Democratic	1835	Incumbent retired to run for governor. Democratic hold.	▌ ✓ Williamson R. W. Cobb (Democratic) 45.2%; ▌William Acklen (Democratic) 37.4%; ▌B. F. Pope (Democratic) 17.4%
Alabama 7	Franklin W. Bowdon	Democratic	1846 (special)	Incumbent re-elected.	▌ ✓ Franklin W. Bowdon (Democratic) 52.3%; ▌Samuel Farrow Rice (Democratic) 38.8%; ▌[FNU] Phillips (Democratic) 7.6%; ▌William Garrett (Democratic) 1.2%

== Arkansas ==
Arkansas elected its sole member August 3, 1846.

District	Incumbent			This race	
District	Member	Party	First elected	Results	Candidates
Arkansas at-large	Vacant			Rep. Archibald Yell (D) resigned July 1, 1846 to serve in the United States Volunteers. Democratic hold. Winner was not elected to finish the current term; see above.	▌ ✓ Robert W. Johnson (Democratic); Uncontested

== Connecticut ==
Elections were held April 5, 1847, after the March 4, 1847 beginning of the term, but before the House first convened in December 1847.

District	Incumbent			This race	
District	Member	Party	First elected	Results	Candidates
Connecticut 1	James Dixon	Whig	1845	Incumbent re-elected.	▌ ✓ James Dixon (Whig) 50.5%; ▌William J. Hamersly (Democratic) 47.1%; ▌William H. Burleigh (Liberty) 2.4%
Connecticut 2	Samuel D. Hubbard	Whig	1845	Incumbent re-elected.	▌ ✓ Samuel D. Hubbard (Whig) 50.9%; ▌Samuel Ingham (Democratic) 46.3%; ▌Ely Warner (Liberty) 2.8%
Connecticut 3	John A. Rockwell	Whig	1845	Incumbent re-elected.	▌ ✓ John A. Rockwell (Whig) 49.5%; ▌Noyes Billings (Democratic) 45.2%; ▌Increase Wilson (Liberty) 5.3%
Connecticut 4	Truman Smith	Whig	1839; 1843 (retired); 1845	Incumbent re-elected.	▌ ✓ Truman Smith (Whig) 52.0%; ▌George Taylor (Democratic) 45.7%; ▌Uriel Tuttle (Liberty) 2.3%

== Delaware ==
The election was held November 10, 1846.

District	Incumbent			This race	
District	Member	Party	First elected	Results	Candidates
Delaware at-large	John W. Houston	Whig	1844	Incumbent re-elected.	▌ ✓ John W. Houston (Whig) 51.0%; ▌John D. Delworth (Democratic) 49.0%

== Florida ==
The election was held October 5, 1846.

District	Incumbent			This race	
District	Member	Party	First elected	Results	Candidates
Florida at-large	William H. Brockenbrough	Democratic	1845 (special)	Incumbent retired. Whig gain.	▌ ✓ Edward C. Cabell (Whig) 50.9%; ▌William A. Kain (Democratic) 49.1%

== Georgia ==
Elections were held October 5, 1846.

District	Incumbent			This race	
District	Member	Party	First elected	Results	Candidates
Georgia 1
Georgia 2
Georgia 3
Georgia 4
Georgia 5
Georgia 6
Georgia 7
Georgia 8

== Illinois ==
1846 Illinois's 7th congressional district election
- August 3, 1846
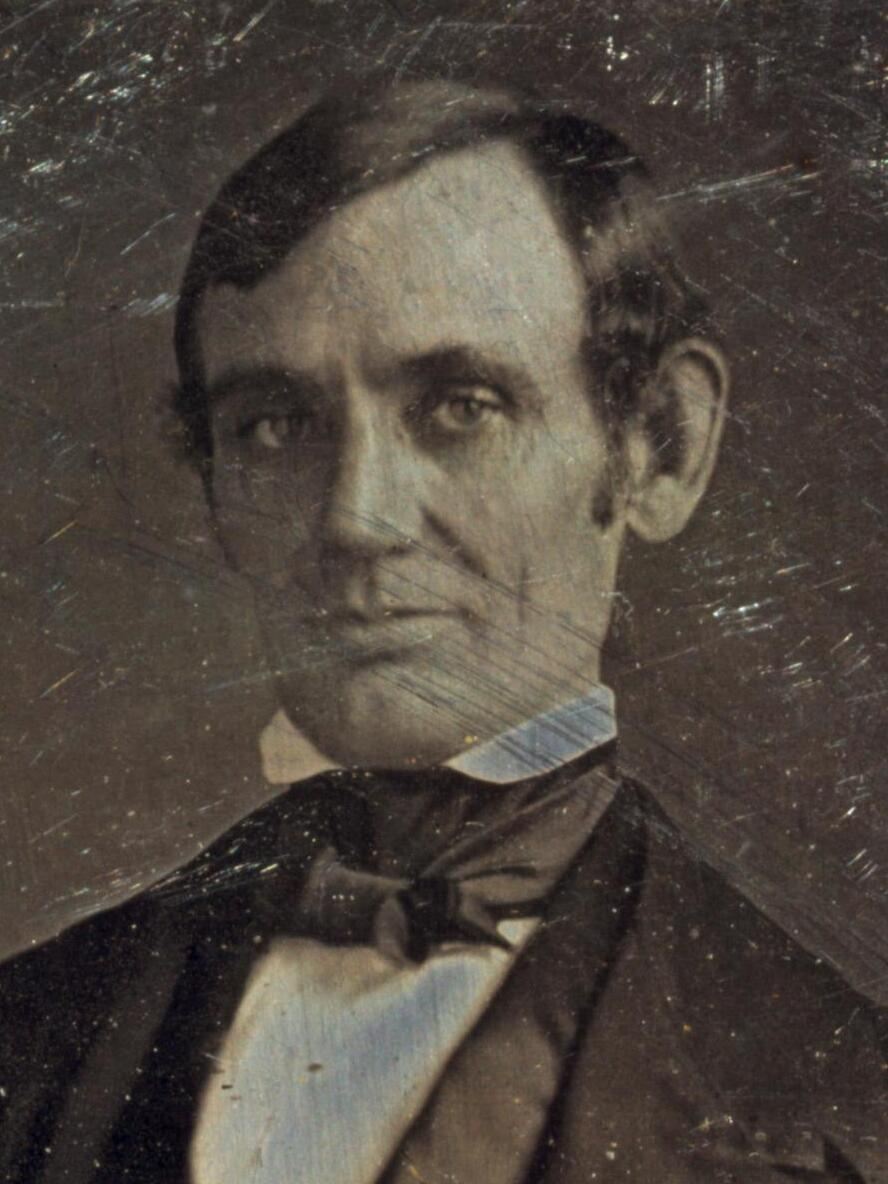

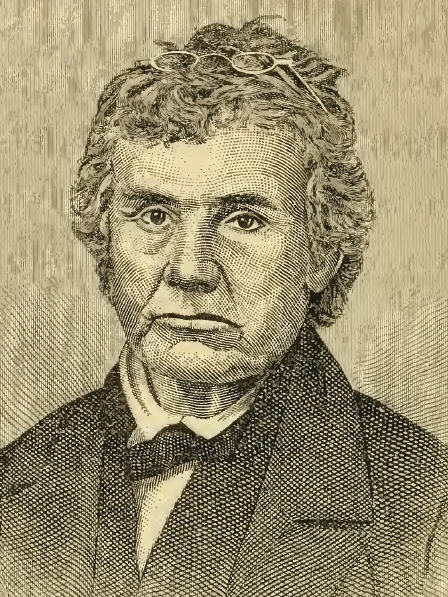
Nominee	Abraham Lincoln	Peter Cartwright
Party	Whig	Democratic
Popular vote	6,340	4,829
Percentage	55.53%	42.29%
- Lincoln: 30–40% 50–60% 60–70% 70–80% Cartwright: 50–60%
U.S. Representative before election
Edward D. Baker
Whig
Elected U.S. Representative
Abraham Lincoln
Whig

Elections were held August 3, 1846.

District	Incumbent			This race	
District	Member	Party	First elected	Results	Candidates
Illinois 1	Robert Smith	Democratic	1842	Incumbent re-elected. Independent Democratic gain.	▌ ✓ Robert Smith (Independent Democratic) 58.1%; ▌Lyman Trumbull (Democratic) 41.3%
Illinois 2	John A. McClernand	Democratic	1842	Incumbent re-elected.	▌ ✓ John A. McClernand (Democratic) 97.3%
Illinois 3	Orlando B. Ficklin	Democratic	1842	Incumbent re-elected.	▌ ✓ Orlando B. Ficklin (Democratic) 57.1%; ▌ 'Robert K. McLaughlin (Independent) 42.7%
Illinois 4	John Wentworth	Democratic	1842	Incumbent re-elected.	▌ ✓ John Wentworth (Democratic) 55.8%; ▌John Kerr (Whig) 28.0%; ▌Owen Lovejoy (Liberty) 16.3%
Illinois 5	Stephen A. Douglas	Democratic	1842	Incumbent re-elected.	▌ ✓ Stephen A. Douglas (Democratic) 57.0%; ▌Isaac VanderVenter (Whig) 40.6%
Illinois 6	Joseph P. Hoge	Democratic	1842	Incumbent retired. Democratic hold.	▌ ✓ Thomas J. Turner (Democratic) 48.4%; ▌James Knox (Whig) 46.3%; ▌Wade Talccott (Liberty) 5.2%
Illinois 7	Edward D. Baker	Whig	1844	Incumbent retired. Whig hold. Incumbent then resigned early, leading to a special election.	▌ ✓ Abraham Lincoln (Whig) 55.53%; ▌Peter Cartwright (Democratic) 42.29%; ▌Elihu Walcott (Liberty) 2.18%

== Indiana ==
Elections were held August 2, 1847, after the March 4, 1847 beginning of the term, but before the House first convened in December 1847.

District	Incumbent			This race	
District	Member	Party	First elected	Results	Candidates
Indiana 1
Indiana 2
Indiana 3
Indiana 4
Indiana 5
Indiana 6
Indiana 7
Indiana 8
Indiana 9
Indiana 10

== Iowa ==
=== Elections to the 29th Congress ===
Elections for the new state were held October 26, 1846.

District	Incumbent			This race	
District	Member	Party	First elected	Results	Candidates
Iowa at-large (2 seats)	New state			New seat. New member elected October 26, 1846. Democratic gain. Winner (Leffler) was later elected in the 2nd district to the next term, see below.	(Elected on a general ticket): ▌ ✓ Shepherd Leffler (Democratic) 26.47%; ▌ ✓ S. Clinton Hastings (Democratic) 26.10%; ▌Joseph H. Hedrick (Whig) 23.86%; ▌G. C. Mitchell (Whig) 23.57%
Iowa at-large (2 seats)	New state			New seat. New member elected October 26, 1846. Democratic gain. Winner (Hastings) would not be a candidate for the next term, see below.	(Elected on a general ticket): ▌ ✓ Shepherd Leffler (Democratic) 26.47%; ▌ ✓ S. Clinton Hastings (Democratic) 26.10%; ▌Joseph H. Hedrick (Whig) 23.86%; ▌G. C. Mitchell (Whig) 23.57%

=== Elections to the 30th Congress ===
Elections were held August 2, 1847, after the March 4, 1847 beginning of the term, but before the House first convened in December 1847.

District	Incumbent			This race	
District	Member	Party	First elected	Results	Candidates
Iowa 1	New seat			New district. Democratic gain.	▌ ✓ William Thompson (Democratic) 52.59%; ▌Jesse B. Browne (Whig) 47.41%
Iowa 2	Shepherd Leffler; Redistricted from the at-large district	Democratic	1846	Incumbent re-elected.	▌ ✓ Shepherd Leffler (Democratic) 51.43%; ▌Thomas McKnight (Whig) 48.58%
Iowa 2	S. Clinton Hastings; Redistricted from the at-large district	Democratic	1846	Incumbent retired. Democratic loss.	▌ ✓ Shepherd Leffler (Democratic) 51.43%; ▌Thomas McKnight (Whig) 48.58%

== Kentucky ==
Elections were held August 2, 1847, after the March 4, 1847 beginning of the term, but before the House first convened in December 1847.

District	Incumbent			This race	
District	Member	Party	First elected	Results	Candidates
Kentucky 1
Kentucky 2
Kentucky 3
Kentucky 4
Kentucky 5
Kentucky 6
Kentucky 7
Kentucky 8
Kentucky 9
Kentucky 10

== Louisiana ==
Elections were held November 2, 1847, after the March 4, 1847 beginning of the term, but before the House first convened in December 1847.

District	Incumbent			This race	
District	Member	Party	First elected	Results	Candidates
Louisiana 1
Louisiana 2
Louisiana 3
Louisiana 4

== Maine ==
Elections were held September 14, 1846.

District	Incumbent			This race	
District	Member	Party	First elected	Results	Candidates
Maine 1
Maine 2
Maine 3
Maine 4
Maine 5
Maine 6
Maine 7

== Maryland ==
Elections were held October 6, 1847 elections were after the March 4, 1847 beginning of the new term, but still before the Congress convened in December 1847.

District	Incumbent			This race	
District	Member	Party	First elected	Results	Candidates
Maryland 1
Maryland 2
Maryland 3
Maryland 4
Maryland 5
Maryland 6

== Massachusetts ==
Elections were held November 9, 1846.

District	Incumbent			This race	
District	Member	Party	First elected	Results	Candidates
Massachusetts 1
Massachusetts 2
Massachusetts 3
Massachusetts 4
Massachusetts 5
Massachusetts 6
Massachusetts 7	Julius Rockwell	Whig	1844 (late)	Incumbent re-elected.	▌ ✓ Julius Rockwell (Whig) 53.34%; ▌Horatio Byington (Democratic) 38.63%; ▌Jasper Bement (Liberty) 8.04%
Massachusetts 8	John Quincy Adams	Whig	1830	Incumbent re-elected.	▌ ✓ John Quincy Adams (Whig) 62.23%; ▌Isaac H. Wright (Democratic) 28.25%; ▌Appleton Howe (Liberty) 9.52%
Massachusetts 9
Massachusetts 10

== Michigan ==
Elections were held November 3, 1846.

District	Incumbent			This race	
District	Member	Party	First elected	Results	Candidates
Michigan 1	Robert McClelland	Democratic	1843	Incumbent re-elected.	▌ ✓ Robert McClelland (Democratic) 52.2%; ▌Edwin Lawrence (Whig) 42.7%; ▌Charles H. Stewart (Liberty) 5.1%
Michigan 2	John S. Chipman	Democratic	1844	Incumbent retired. Democratic hold.	▌ ✓ Edward Bradley (Democratic) 49.3%; ▌James W. Gordon (Whig) 44.9%; ▌Erastus Hussey (Liberty) 5.8%
Michigan 3	James B. Hunt	Democratic	1843	Incumbent retired. Democratic hold.	▌ ✓ Kinsley S. Bingham (Democratic) 49.0%; ▌George W. Wisner (Whig) 43.6%; ▌William Caulfield (Liberty) 7.4%

== Mississippi ==
Elections were held November 1–2, 1847, after the March 4, 1847 beginning of the term, but before the House first convened in December 1847.

District	Incumbent			This race	
District	Member	Party	First elected	Results	Candidates
Mississippi 1	Jacob Thompson	Democratic	1839	Incumbent redistricted from the at-large district. Democratic hold.	▌ ✓ Jacob Thompson (Democratic) 54.38%; ▌Robert Josselyn (Independent Democratic) 45.62%
Mississippi 2	None (new district)			New district. Democratic gain.	▌ ✓ Winfield S. Featherston (Democratic) 53.52%; ▌Alexander K. McClung (Whig) 46.48%
Mississippi 3	Robert W. Roberts	Democratic	1843	Incumbent redistricted from the at-large district. Whig gain.	▌ ✓ Patrick W. Tompkins (Whig) 52.06%; ▌Robert W. Roberts (Democratic) 47.94%
Mississippi 4	None (new district)			New district. Democratic gain.	▌ ✓ Albert G. Brown (Democratic) 93.74%; ▌John A. Quitman (Democratic) 5.64%; Scattering 0.62%

== Missouri ==
Elections were held August 2, 1846. All five seats remained Democratic. Three of the members retired.

District	Incumbent			This race	
District	Member	Party	First elected	Results	Candidates
Missouri 1	James B. Bowlin; Redistricted from the at-large district	Democratic	1842	Incumbent re-elected.	▌ ✓ James B. Bowlin (Democratic) 52.20%; ▌Uriel Wright (Whig) 36.81%; ▌William Milburn (Independent) 10.99%
Missouri 2	William McDaniel; Redistricted from the at-large district (Note: Redistricting location speculative)	Democratic	1846 (special)	Incumbent retired. Democratic hold.	▌ ✓ John Jameson (Democratic) 81.09%; ▌Preston P. Brickey (Whig) 18.91%
Missouri 2	James H. Relfe; Redistricted from the at-large district	Democratic	1842	Incumbent retired. Democratic loss.	▌ ✓ John Jameson (Democratic) 81.09%; ▌Preston P. Brickey (Whig) 18.91%
Missouri 3	New district			New district. Democratic gain.	▌ ✓ James S. Green (Democratic) 55.27%; ▌John Gaines Miller (Whig) 44.73%
Missouri 4	New district			New district. Democratic gain.	▌ ✓ Willard P. Hall (Democratic) 64.98%; ▌James H. Birch (Whig) 35.02%
Missouri 5	John S. Phelps; Redistricted from the at-large district	Democratic	1844	Incumbent re-elected.	▌ ✓ John S. Phelps (Democratic) 53.26%; ▌John P. Campbell (Whig) 46.74%
Missouri 5	Leonard H. Sims; Redistricted from the at-large district	Democratic	1844	Incumbent retired. Democratic loss.	▌ ✓ John S. Phelps (Democratic) 53.26%; ▌John P. Campbell (Whig) 46.74%

== New Hampshire ==
Elections were held March 9, 1847, after the March 4, 1847 beginning of the term, but before the House first convened in December 1847. Two of the districts had run-off elections in July 1847.

District	Incumbent			This race	
District	Member	Party	First elected	Results	Candidates
New Hampshire 1	Vacant seat due to the failure to elect.			Independent gain.	First ballot (March 9, 1847): ▌Benning W. Jenness (Democratic) 44.66%; ▌Amos Tuck (Liberty) 15.04%; ▌Ichabod Goodwin (Whig); Second ballot (July 8, 1847): ▌ ✓ Amos Tuck (Independent) 56.66%; ▌Benning W. Jenness (Democratic) 42.49%
New Hampshire 2	Moses Norris Jr. Redistricted from the at-large district	Democratic	1843	Incumbent retired. Democratic hold.	▌ ✓ Charles Peaslee (Democratic) 57.27%; ▌Joel Eastman (Whig) 27.78%; ▌George W. Stevens (Liberty) 14.96%
New Hampshire 3	Mace Moulton; Redistricted from the at-large district	Democratic	1845	Incumbent lost re-election. Whig gain.	First ballot (March 9, 1847): ▌Mace Moulton (Democratic); ▌James Wilson (Whig) 42.34%; ▌John Preston (Liberty) 10.51%; Second ballot (July 8, 1847): ▌ ✓ James Wilson (Whig) 51.27%; ▌Mace Moulton (Democratic) 44.00%; ▌John Preston (Liberty) 4.72%
New Hampshire 4	James Hutchins Johnson; Redistricted from the at-large district	Democratic	1845	Incumbent re-elected.	▌ ✓ James Hutchins Johnson (Democratic); [data missing]

== New Jersey ==
Elections were held November 3, 1846.

District	Incumbent			This race	
District	Member	Party	First elected	Results	Candidates
New Jersey 1
New Jersey 2
New Jersey 3
New Jersey 4
New Jersey 5

== New York ==
Elections were held November 3, 1846.

District	Incumbent			This race	
District	Member	Party	First elected	Results	Candidates
New York 1
New York 2
New York 3
New York 4
New York 5
New York 6
New York 7
New York 8
New York 9
New York 10
New York 11
New York 12
New York 13
New York 14
New York 15
New York 16
New York 17
New York 18
New York 19
New York 20
New York 21
New York 22
New York 23
New York 24
New York 25
New York 26
New York 27
New York 28
New York 29
New York 30
New York 31
New York 32
New York 33
New York 34

== North Carolina ==
Elections were held August 5, 1847, after the March 4, 1847 beginning of the term, but before the House first convened in December 1847.

District	Incumbent			This race	
District	Member	Party	First elected	Results	Candidates
North Carolina 1
North Carolina 2
North Carolina 3
North Carolina 4
North Carolina 5
North Carolina 6
North Carolina 7
North Carolina 8
North Carolina 9

== Ohio ==
Elections were held October 13, 1846.

District	Incumbent			This race	
District	Member	Party	First elected	Results	Candidates
Ohio 1
Ohio 2
Ohio 3
Ohio 4
Ohio 5
Ohio 6
Ohio 7
Ohio 8
Ohio 9
Ohio 10
Ohio 11
Ohio 12
Ohio 13
Ohio 14
Ohio 15
Ohio 16
Ohio 17
Ohio 18
Ohio 19
Ohio 20
Ohio 21

== Pennsylvania ==
Elections were held October 13, 1846.

District	Incumbent			This race	
District	Member	Party	First elected	Results	Candidates
Pennsylvania 1
Pennsylvania 2
Pennsylvania 3
Pennsylvania 4
Pennsylvania 5
Pennsylvania 6
Pennsylvania 7
Pennsylvania 8
Pennsylvania 9
Pennsylvania 10
Pennsylvania 11
Pennsylvania 12
Pennsylvania 13
Pennsylvania 14
Pennsylvania 15
Pennsylvania 16
Pennsylvania 17
Pennsylvania 18
Pennsylvania 19
Pennsylvania 20
Pennsylvania 21
Pennsylvania 22
Pennsylvania 23
Pennsylvania 24

== Rhode Island ==
Elections were held April 7, 1847, after the March 4, 1847 beginning of the term, but before the House first convened in December 1847.

District	Incumbent			This race	
District	Member	Party	First elected	Results	Candidates
Rhode Island 1
Rhode Island 2

== South Carolina ==
Elections were held October 12–13, 1846.

District	Incumbent			This race	
District	Member	Party	First elected	Results	Candidates
South Carolina 1
South Carolina 2
South Carolina 3
South Carolina 4
South Carolina 5
South Carolina 6
South Carolina 7

== Tennessee ==
Elections were held August 2, 1847.

District	Incumbent			This race	
District	Member	Party	First elected	Results	Candidates
Tennessee 1	Andrew Johnson	Democratic	1842	Incumbent re-elected.	▌ ✓ Andrew Johnson (Democratic) 51.87%; ▌Oliver P. Temple (Whig) 48.13%
Tennessee 2	William M. Cocke	Whig	1845	Incumbent re-elected.	▌ ✓ William M. Cocke (Whig) 61.01%; ▌Wayne W. Wallace (Democratic) 38.99%
Tennessee 3	John H. Crozier	Whig	1845	Incumbent re-elected.	▌ ✓ John H. Crozier (Whig) 51.76%; ▌Samuel S. Smith (Democratic) 48.25%
Tennessee 4	Alvan Cullom	Democratic	1842	Incumbent retired. Democratic hold.	▌ ✓ Hugh L. W. Hill (Democratic) 59.92%; ▌John L. Goodall (Whig) 40.08%
Tennessee 5	George W. Jones	Democratic	1842	Incumbent re-elected.	▌ ✓ George W. Jones (Democratic) 99.14%; ▌J. M. Crowly (Unknown) 0.86%
Tennessee 6	Barclay Martin	Democratic	1845	Incumbent retired. Democratic hold.	▌ ✓ James H. Thomas (Democratic) 55.59%; ▌Boling Gordan (Whig) 44.41%
Tennessee 7	Meredith P. Gentry	Whig	1845	Incumbent re-elected.	▌ ✓ Meredith P. Gentry (Whig) 65.05%; ▌R. G. Ellis (Democratic) 34.95%
Tennessee 8	Edwin H. Ewing	Whig	1845 (special)	Incumbent retired. Whig hold.	▌ ✓ Washington Barrow (Whig) 58.79%; ▌John B. Pittman (Democratic) 41.22%
Tennessee 9	Lucien B. Chase	Democratic	1845	Incumbent re-elected.	▌ ✓ Lucien B. Chase (Democratic) 54.29%; ▌John T. Swayne (Whig) 45.71%
Tennessee 10	Frederick P. Stanton	Democratic	1845	Incumbent re-elected.	▌ ✓ Frederick P. Stanton (Democratic) 50.11%; ▌John W. Harris (Whig) 49.89%
Tennessee 11	Milton Brown	Whig	1841	Incumbent retired. Whig hold.	▌ ✓ William T. Haskell (Whig) 57.18%; ▌John Gardner (Democratic) 42.82%

== Texas ==
=== 29th Congress ===
Elections for the 29th Congress were held in March 1846.

District	Incumbent			This race	
District	Member	Party	First elected	Results	Candidates
Texas 1	None (new state)			New district. Democratic gain. Winner was also elected to the next term; see below.	▌ ✓ David S. Kaufman (Democratic) 53.9%; ▌William R. Scurry (Independent) 26.3%; ▌William B. Ochiltree (Independent) 19.8%
Texas 2	None (new state)			New district. Democratic gain. Winner was also elected to the next term; see below.	▌ ✓ Timothy Pilsbury (Democratic) 30.1%; ▌Samuel May Williams (Independent) 28.0%; ▌William Gordon Cooke (Independent) 23.9%; ▌John M. Lewis (Independent) 9.5%; ▌Joseph C. Megginson (Independent) 5.4%; ▌Thomas Jefferson Green (Independent) 2.4%; Scattering 0.7%

=== 30th Congress ===
Elections for the 30th United States Congress were held November 2, 1846.

District	Incumbent			This race	
District	Member	Party	First elected	Results	Candidates
Texas 1	David S. Kaufman	Democratic	1846	Incumbent re-elected.	▌ ✓ David S. Kaufman (Democratic) 98.1%; Scattering 1.9%
Texas 2	Timothy Pilsbury	Democratic	1846	Incumbent re-elected.	▌ ✓ Timothy Pilsbury (Democratic) 57.5%; ▌Samuel May Williams (Independent) 20.5%; ▌William E. Jones (Independent) 11.7%; ▌Robert Baylor (Independent) 10.2%

== Vermont ==
Elections were held September 1, 1846.

District	Incumbent			This race	
District	Member	Party	First elected	Results	Candidates
Vermont 1	Solomon Foot	Whig	1843	Incumbent retired. Whig hold.	▌ ✓ William Henry (Whig) 55.2%; ▌Jonathan D. Bradley (Democratic) 25.6%; ▌Oscar L. Shafter (Liberty) 8.6%; ▌John Roberts (Democratic) 7.6%
Vermont 2	Jacob Collamer	Whig	1843	Incumbent re-elected.	First ballot: ▌Jacob Collamer (Whig) 49.1%; ▌Hugh H. Henry (Democratic) 34.7%; ▌Titus Hutchinson (Liberty) 15.6%; Second ballot: ▌ ✓ Jacob Collamer (Whig) 62.8%; ▌Levi B. Vilas (Democratic) 26.8%; ▌Titus Hutchinson (Liberty) 10.3%
Vermont 3	George P. Marsh	Whig	1843	Incumbent re-elected.	▌ ✓ George P. Marsh (Whig) 53.9%; ▌Homer E. Hubbell (Democratic) 30.6%; ▌Norris Day (Unknown) 15.1%
Vermont 4	Paul Dillingham	Democratic	1843	Incumbent retired. Democratic hold.	First ballot: ▌Lucius B. Peck (Democratic) 43.4%; ▌George B. Chandler (Whig) 40.1%; Write-ins 16.1%; Second ballot: ▌Lucius B. Peck (Democratic) 42.9%; ▌George B. Chandler (Whig) 42.5%; ▌A. J. Rowell (Liberty) 14.5%; Third ballot: ▌ ✓ Lucius B. Peck (Democratic) 47.0%; ▌George B. Chandler (Whig) 43.5%; ▌A. J. Rowell (Liberty) 9.4%

== Virginia ==
Elections were held April 22, 1847, after the March 4, 1847 beginning of the term, but before the House first convened in December 1847.

District	Incumbent			This race	
District	Member	Party	First elected	Results	Candidates
Virginia 1	Archibald Atkinson	Democratic	1843	Incumbent re-elected.	▌ ✓ Archibald Atkinson (Democratic) 50.8%; ▌Samuel Watts (Whig) 49.2%
Virginia 2	George Dromgoole	Democratic	1835; 1841 (retired); 1843	Incumbent re-elected.	▌ ✓ George Dromgoole (Democratic) 50.2%; ▌George W. Bolling (Whig) 49.8%
Virginia 3	William Tredway	Democratic	1845	Incumbent lost re-election. Whig gain.	▌ ✓ Thomas Flournoy (Whig) 52.0%; ▌William Tredway (Democratic) 48.0%
Virginia 4	Edmund W. Hubard	Democratic	1841	Incumbent retired. Democratic hold.	▌ ✓ Thomas S. Bocock (Democratic) 51.4%; ▌Henry P. Irving (Whig) 48.6%
Virginia 5	Shelton Leake	Democratic	1845	Incumbent lost re-election. Whig gain.	▌ ✓ William L. Goggin (Whig) 50.9%; ▌Shelton Leake (Democratic) 49.1%
Virginia 6	John Seddon	Democratic	1845	Incumbent lost re-election. Whig gain.	▌ ✓ John Botts (Whig) 55.4%; ▌James Seddon (Democratic) 44.6%
Virginia 7	Thomas H. Bayly	Democratic	1844 (special)	Incumbent re-elected.	▌ ✓ Thomas H. Bayly (Democratic) 52.5%; ▌John J. Jones (Whig) 47.5%
Virginia 8	Robert M. T. Hunter	Democratic	1835; 1843 (lost); 1845	Incumbent retired. Democratic hold.	▌ ✓ Richard L. T. Beale (Democratic) 51.9%; ▌Willoughby Newton (Whig) 48.1%
Virginia 9	John Pendleton	Whig	1845	Incumbent re-elected.	▌ ✓ John Pendleton (Whig) 58.3%; ▌Richard T. Hunter (Democratic) 41.7%
Virginia 10	Henry Bedinger	Democratic	1845	Incumbent re-elected.	▌ ✓ Henry Bedinger (Democratic) 52.6%; ▌Anthony T. Kennedy (Whig) 47.4%
Virginia 11	James McDowell	Democratic	1846 (special)	Incumbent re-elected.	▌ ✓ James McDowell (Democratic) 58.2%; ▌Algernon S. Gray (Whig) 41.8%
Virginia 12	Augustus A. Chapman	Democratic	1843	Incumbent lost re-election. Whig gain.	▌ ✓ William B. Preston (Whig) 51.6%; ▌Augustus A. Chapman (Democratic) 48.4%
Virginia 13	George W. Hopkins	Democratic	1835	Incumbent retired. Whig gain.	▌ ✓ Andrew S. Fulton (Whig) 38.6%; ▌Fayette McMullen (Democratic) 38.5%; ▌Samuel E. Goodson (Democratic) 22.8%
Virginia 14	Joseph Johnson	Democratic	1823; 1827 (lost); 1833 (special); 1833 (retired); 1835; 1841 (retired); 1845	Incumbent retired. Democratic hold.	▌ ✓ Robert A. Thompson (Democratic) 53.0%; ▌William McComas (Whig) 47.0%
Virginia 15	William G. Brown Sr.	Democratic	1845	Incumbent re-elected.	▌ ✓ William G. Brown Sr. (Democratic) 67.3%; ▌J. T. Hawkins (Whig) 32.7%

== Wisconsin Territory ==
See Non-voting delegates, below.

== Non-voting delegates ==
District	Incumbent			This race	
District	Delegate	Party	First elected	Results	Candidates
Wisconsin Territory	Morgan Lewis Martin	Democratic	1844 or 1845	Incumbent was not renominated. Whig gain.	▌ ✓ John Hubbard Tweedy (Whig); ▌Moses M. Strong (Democratic)

== See also ==
- 1846 United States elections
  - List of United States House of Representatives elections (1824–1854)
  - 1846–47 United States Senate elections
- 29th United States Congress
- 30th United States Congress

== Bibliography ==
- Dubin, Michael J. (March 1, 1998). United States Congressional Elections, 1788-1997: The Official Results of the Elections of the 1st Through 105th Congresses. McFarland and Company. ISBN 978-0786402830.
- Martis, Kenneth C. (January 1, 1989). The Historical Atlas of Political Parties in the United States Congress, 1789-1989. Macmillan Publishing Company. ISBN 978-0029201701.
- Moore, John L., ed. (1994). Congressional Quarterly's Guide to U.S. Elections (Third ed.). Congressional Quarterly Inc. ISBN 978-0871879967.
- "Party Divisions of the House of Representatives* 1789–Present". Office of the Historian, House of United States House of Representatives.
