= Frank H. Lee =

American politician and lawyer (1873–1952)

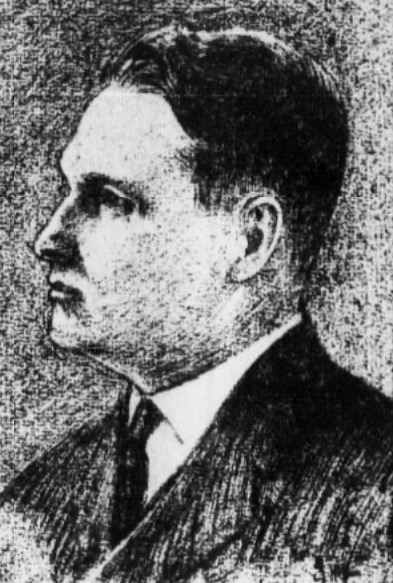
- Lee in 1922

Member of the U.S. House of Representatives from Missouri's at-large district
- In office March 4, 1933 – January 3, 1935
- Preceded by: District created
- Succeeded by: District dissolved

Personal details
- Born: Frank Hood Lee; March 29, 1873 De Soto, Kansas, US
- Died: November 20, 1952 (aged 79) Joplin, Missouri, US
- Party: Democratic
- Children: 7
- Occupation: Politician, lawyer

Frank Hood Lee (March 29, 1873 – November 20, 1952) was an American politician and lawyer. A Democrat, he was a member of the United States House of Representatives from Missouri.

== Biography ==
Lee was born on March 20, 1873, on a farm near De Soto, Kansas, the son of Daniel M. Lee and Lucy M. (née Howard) Lee. Through his father, he was a distant relative of general Robert E. Lee. His family later moved to Virgil City, Missouri, where he attended public school. He later moved to Joplin, serving as its justice of the peace in 1894. He studied law, and in 1904, was admitted to the bar, after which he commenced practice in Joplin.

Lee was a Democrat. He served in the Missouri House of Representatives from 1915 to 1918, representing the 3rd district, located in Jasper County. He served in the United States House of Representatives from March 4, 1933, to January 3, 1935, representing Missouri's at-large district. His candidacy was endorsed by President Franklin D. Roosevelt. Over his career, he ran for Congress on four other occasions: in 1922 and 1930, for the 15th district; in 1930, for the 15th district; and 1934 and 1938, for the 7th district.

After serving in Congress, Lee continued practicing law. He also owned The Southwestern, a Jasper County newspaper, and the Jefferson Hotel. On November 24, 1902, he married Allie King; they had seven children together. He was Anglician, as well as a member of the Benevolent and Protective Order of Elks and the Knights of Pythias. He died on November 20, 1952, aged 79, in Joplin. He was buried at the Ozark Memorial Park.

U.S. House of Representatives
Preceded by None (New district)	Member of the U.S. House of Representatives from Missouri's at-large congressional district 1933-1935	Succeeded by None (District dissolved)
