= William O. Atkeson =

American politician (1854–1931)

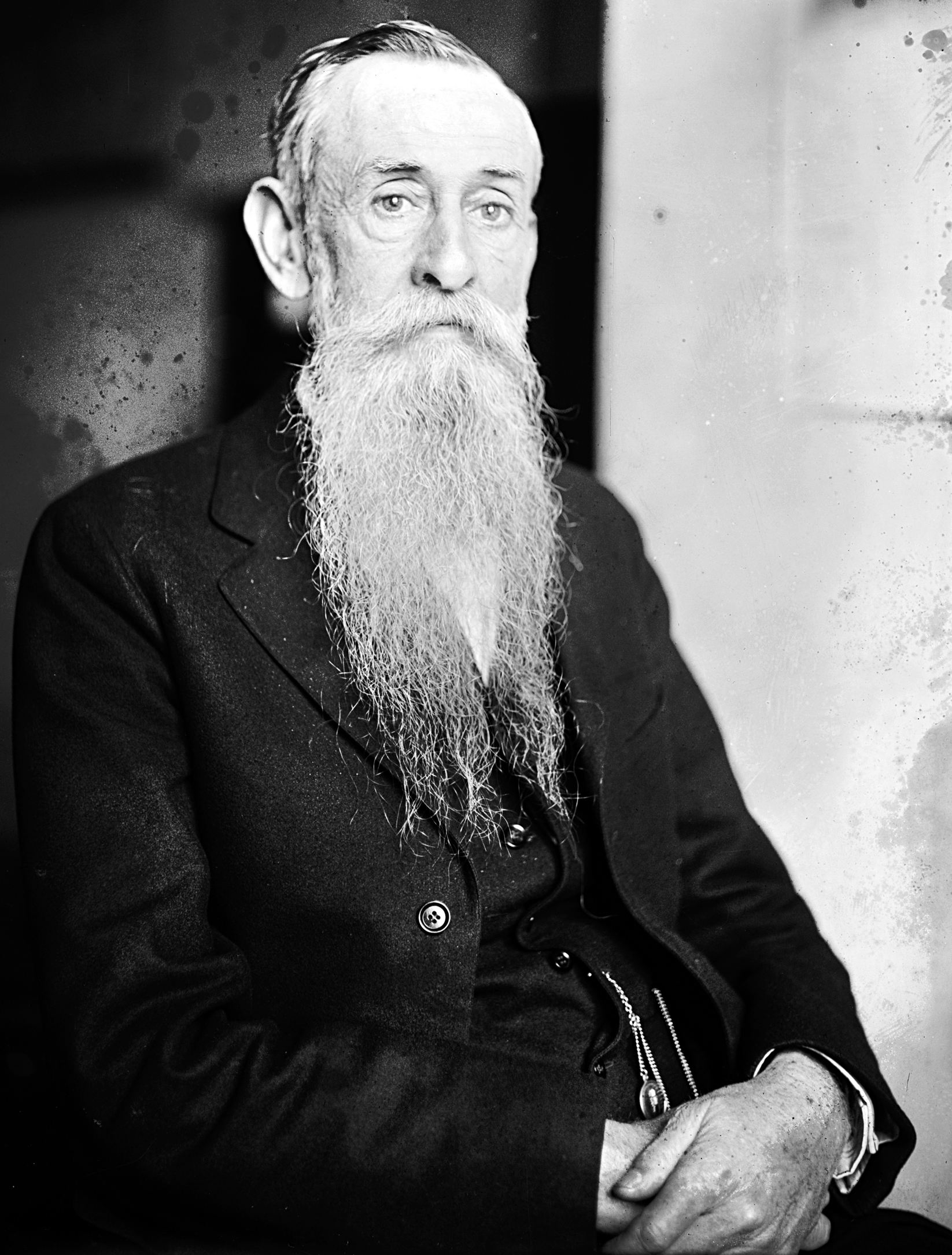
- Atkeson, 1921–22

Member of the U.S. House of Representatives from Missouri's 6th district
- In office March 4, 1921 – March 3, 1923
- Preceded by: Clement C. Dickinson
- Succeeded by: Clement C. Dickinson

Personal details
- Born: August 24, 1854 Buffalo, Virginia, US (now West Virginia)
- Died: October 16, 1931 (aged 77) Butler, Missouri, US
- Party: Republican
- Profession: lawyer

William Oscar Atkeson (August 24, 1854 – October 16, 1931) was a Republican Representative representing Missouri's 6th congressional district from March 4, 1921 – March 3, 1923.

Atkeson was born on a farm in Buffalo, Virginia (now West Virginia). He attended the University of Kentucky at Lexington; taught school in Mason County, West Virginia and at New Haven, West Virginia. He graduated from Fairmont Normal School in 1875. He moved to Point Pleasant, West Virginia in 1876 and edited and published the West Virginia Monitor; studied law; was admitted to the bar in 1877 and commenced practice in Council Grove, Kansas.

He moved to Rich Hill, Missouri in Bates County, Missouri, in 1882 and to Butler, Missouri, in 1889. He was prosecuting attorney of Bates County, 1891–1893; unsuccessful candidate for circuit judge of the twenty-ninth judicial circuit in 1892; owner and editor of the Butler Free Press 1894-1902; unsuccessful candidate for election in 1906 to the Sixtieth Congress and in 1908 to the Sixty-first Congress; served as deputy State hotel inspector in 1910 and 1911 and as deputy State labor commissioner 1911-1913; owner and editor of the Bates County Record 1915-1918; elected as a Republican to the Sixty-seventh Congress (March 4, 1921 – March 3, 1923); unsuccessful candidate for reelection in 1922 to the Sixty-eighth Congress; served as State warehouse commissioner in Kansas City, Missouri, from July 1, 1923, until February 5, 1925, when he resigned; resumed the practice of law and also engaged in literary pursuits; died in Butler, October 16, 1931; interment in Oak Hill Cemetery.

U.S. House of Representatives
Preceded by Clement C. Dickinson	Member of the U.S. House of Representatives from Missouri's 6th congressional district March 4, 1921–March 3, 1923	Succeeded by Clement C. Dickinson
