= Clement C. Dickinson =

American politician (1849–1938)

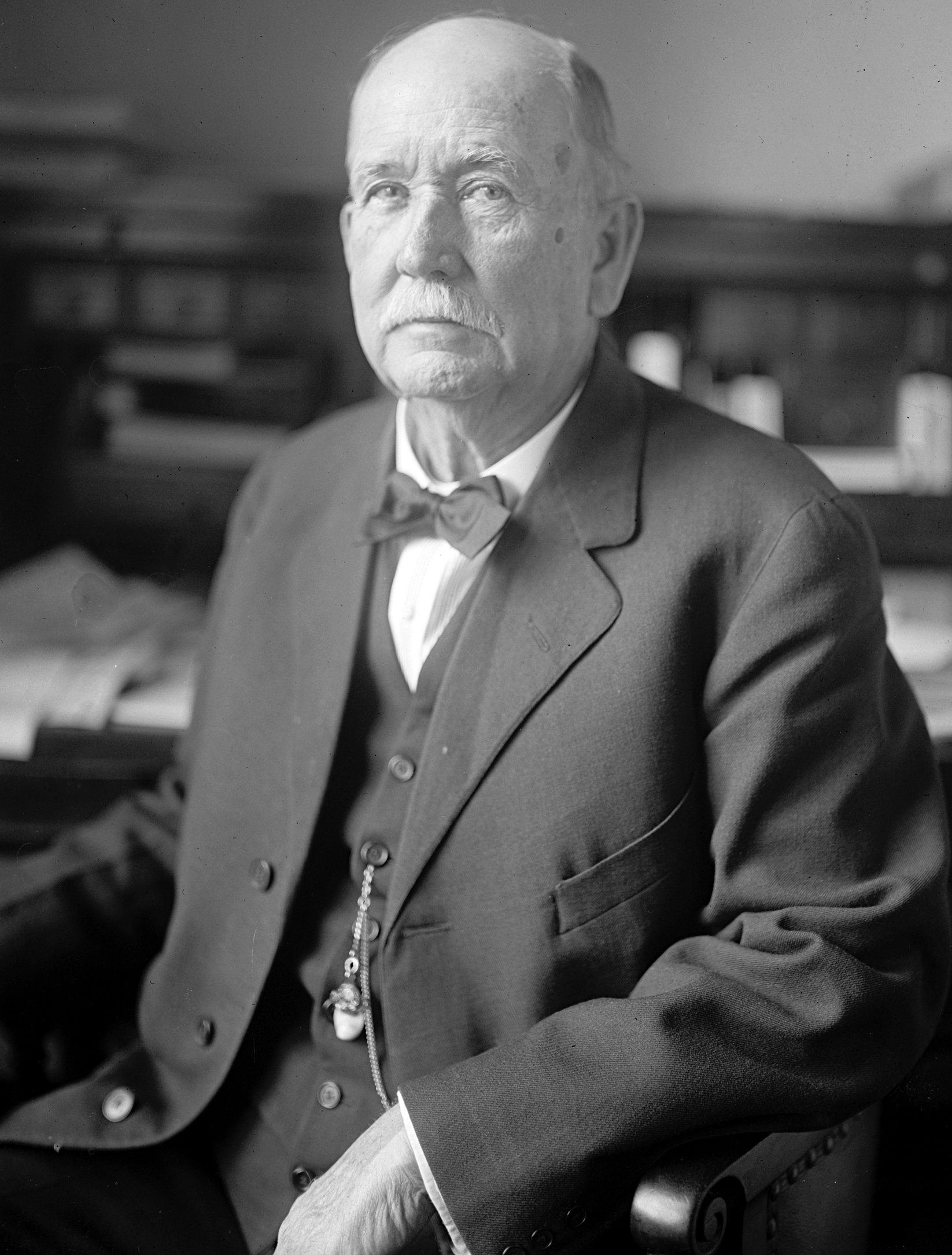
- Dickinson in 1923

Member of the U.S. House of Representatives from Missouri's 6th district
- In office February 1, 1910 – March 3, 1921
- Preceded by: David A. De Armond
- Succeeded by: William O. Atkeson
- In office March 4, 1923 – March 3, 1929
- Preceded by: William O. Atkeson
- Succeeded by: Thomas Jefferson Halsey
- In office March 4, 1931 – 1933
- Preceded by: Thomas Jefferson Halsey
- Succeeded by: Reuben T. Wood

Member of the U.S. House of Representatives from Missouri's at-large district
- In office 1933 – January 3, 1935
- Preceded by: Reuben T. Wood
- Succeeded by: Clyde Williams

Member of the Missouri House of Representatives from the Henry County district
- In office 1900–1902

Member of the Missouri Senate from the 16th district
- In office 1902–1906

Personal details
- Born: Clement Cabell Dickinson; December 6, 1849 Prince Edward County, Virginia, US
- Died: January 14, 1938 (aged 88) Clinton, Missouri, US
- Party: Democratic
- Relations: Uel W. Lamkin (son-in-law)
- Occupation: Lawyer, politician

Clement Cabell Dickinson (December 6, 1849 – January 14, 1938) was an American lawyer and politician. He was a member of the United States House of Representatives from Missouri.

== Biography ==
Dickinson was born on December 6, 1849, in the courthouse of Prince Edward County, Virginia, to Asa Dupuy Dickinson and Sallie Cabell (née Irvine) Dickinson. He was educated by tutors and at private schools, and in June 1869, he graduated from Hampden-Sydney College. He worked as an educator, teaching at schools in Kentucky and Virginia, as well as in Clinton, Missouri, where he moved to in September 1872. While an educator, he studied law, being admitted to the bar in 1875. From 1877 to 1882, he was prosecuting attorney of Henry County, and from 1882 to 1884, he was Clinton's city attorney.

A Democrat, Dickinson represented Henry County in the Missouri House of Representatives from 1900 to 1902, and represented Missouri's 16th Senate district in the Missouri Senate from 1902 to 1906. He was an administrator of the State Normal School from 1907 to 1913. A candidate from Missouri's 6th congressional district, he first served in the United States House of Representatives from February 1, 1910, to March 3, 1921, filling the unexpired term of David A. De Armond following his death. He served other nonconsecutive terms, from March 4, 1923 to March 3, 1929; March 4, 1931 to 1933; and 1933 to January 3, 1935. By the time he left Congress, he was the oldest member of Congress, with newspapers erroneously naming him Dean of the United States House of Representatives. He was noted for his fiscal policy, serving on the United States House Committee on Ways and Means; he voted against toll fees for ships in the Panama Canal and against the single tax.

After serving in Congress, Dickinson returned to working as a lawyer in Clinton. He married Matilda "Mattie" Emily Parks. He had three children, including Mary Cabell Dickinson, wife of academic administrator Uel W. Lamkin. He died on January 14, 1938, aged 88, in Clinton. He is buried at the Englewood Cemetery. He was one of the final living witnesses of Jefferson Davis' inaugural address, in 1862.

U.S. House of Representatives
Preceded by David A. De Armond	Member of the U.S. House of Representatives from Missouri's 6th congressional district 1910–1921	Succeeded by William O. Atkeson
Preceded by William O. Atkeson	Member of the U.S. House of Representatives from Missouri's 6th congressional district 1923–1929	Succeeded by Thomas Jefferson Halsey
Preceded by Thomas Jefferson Halsey	Member of the U.S. House of Representatives from Missouri's 6th congressional district 1931–1933	Succeeded by Reuben T. Wood
Preceded by None	Member of the U.S. House of Representatives from Missouri; 1933–1935 (At-large)	Succeeded by None
Honorary titles
Preceded by Schuyler Merritt	Oldest member of the U.S. House of Representatives; 1931–1935	Succeeded by Schuyler Merritt
