= Gustavus Miller Bower =

American politician (1790–1864)

Member of the U.S. House of Representatives from Missouri's at-large district
- In office March 4, 1843 – March 3, 1845
- Preceded by: District created
- Succeeded by: Leonard H. Sims

Personal details
- Born: December 12, 1790 near Culpeper, Virginia, U.S.
- Died: November 17, 1864 (aged 73) near Paris, Missouri, U.S.
- Party: Democratic
- Profession: Politician

Military service
- Allegiance: United States
- Battles/wars: War of 1812

Gustavus Miller Bower (December 12, 1790 – November 17, 1864) was a U.S. representative from Missouri.

Born near Culpeper, Virginia, Bower attended the public schools. He studied medicine in Philadelphia, Pennsylvania, moved to Kentucky prior to 1812 and resided near Nicholasville. He then enlisted during the War of 1812 as a surgeon-dresser. He was one of the few survivors of the massacre at Frenchtown, near Detroit, January 23, 1813. He moved to Monroe County, Missouri, in 1833, settling near Paris, and engaged in the practice of medicine as well as agricultural pursuits.

Bower was elected as a Democrat to the Twenty-eighth Congress (March 4, 1843 – March 3, 1845). Afterwards, he resumed the practice of medicine. He died near Paris, Missouri, November 17, 1864. He was interred in the family burial ground north of Paris, Missouri.

U.S. House of Representatives
Preceded by None (new seat)	Member of the U.S. House of Representatives from Missouri's at-large congressional district 1843-1845	Succeeded by Leonard H. Sims
