= James E. Ruffin =

American politician (1893–1977)

Member of the U.S. House of Representatives from Missouri's at-large district
- In office March 4, 1933 – January 3, 1935
- Preceded by: New district
- Succeeded by: District dissolved

Personal details
- Born: James Edward Ruffin; July 24, 1893 near Covington, Kentucky, U.S.
- Died: April 9, 1977 (aged 83) Springfield, Missouri, U.S.
- Resting place: East Lawn Cemetery
- Party: Democratic
- Education: Drury College; Samford University
- Occupation: Politician, attorney

Military service
- Allegiance: United States
- Years of service: 1917–1919
- Rank: First lieutenant

James Edward Ruffin (July 24, 1893 – April 9, 1977) was a U.S. representative from Missouri.

Born on a farm near Covington, Tennessee, Ruffin moved to Aurora, Missouri with his parents. He graduated from Aurora High School in 1912 and from Drury College (Drury University), Springfield, Missouri, in 1916. While in college he was a member of Phi Alpha Sigma, and later Lambda Chi Alpha. He taught school at Nickerson (Kansas) College in 1917, before being commissioned a first lieutenant on November 27, 1917. He served in the Fifty-third Regiment, Pioneer Infantry, overseas with the First and Thirty-fifth Divisions, and was discharged on June 3, 1919.

In 1920, Ruffin graduated from the Cumberland School of Law at Cumberland University, Lebanon, Tennessee, in 1920. He was admitted to the bar that same year and commenced practice in Springfield, Missouri. From 1926 to 1928, he served as assistant city attorney.

Ruffin was elected as a Democrat to the Seventy-third Congress. He was unsuccessful in his bid for renomination to the Seventy-fourth Congress in 1934.

Ruffin was appointed special assistant to the United States Attorney General on May 9, 1935. Assigned to the criminal division of the Department of Justice, he served until August 1953.

He resumed the practice of law in Springfield, Missouri, where he died April 9, 1977. Ruffin is interred in East Lawn Cemetery.

U.S. House of Representatives
| Preceded by None (New district) | Member of the U.S. House of Representatives from Missouri's at-large congressional district 1933–1935 | Succeeded by None (District dissolved) |
