= James Madison Hughes =

American politician (1809–1861)

Member of the U.S. House of Representatives from Missouri's at-large district
- In office March 4, 1843 – March 3, 1845
- Preceded by: Seat created
- Succeeded by: John S. Phelps

Member of the Missouri House of Representatives
- In office 1839

Personal details
- Born: April 7, 1809 Bourbon County, Kentucky, U.S.
- Died: February 26, 1861 (aged 51) Jefferson City, Missouri, U.S.
- Resting place: Bellefontaine Cemetery, St. Louis, Missouri, U.S.
- Party: Democratic
- Profession: Politician, lawyer

James Madison Hughes (April 7, 1809 – February 26, 1861) was a U.S. Representative from Missouri.

Born in Bourbon County, Kentucky, Hughes received a liberal schooling. He studied law. He was admitted to the bar and practiced in Liberty, Missouri. He also engaged in mercantile pursuits in Liberty. He served as a member of the Missouri House of Representatives in 1839.

Hughes was elected as a Democrat to the Twenty-eighth Congress (March 4, 1843 – March 3, 1845). He moved to St. Louis, Missouri, in 1855 and engaged in the banking business. He died in Jefferson City, Missouri on February 26, 1861 and was buried at Bellefontaine Cemetery in St. Louis.

U.S. House of Representatives
Preceded by Seat created	Member of the U.S. House of Representatives from Missouri's at-large congressional district 1843–1845	Succeeded by John S. Phelps
