= Missouri's at-large congressional district =

- Obsolete district
- Created: 1821; 1930
- Eliminated: 1847; 1935
- Years active: 1821-1847; 1933-1935

From the state's creation on August 10, 1821 until the end of the 29th United States Congress (in 1847), and also for the 73rd Congress (1933–1935), Missouri elected its members of the United States House of Representatives at-large statewide on a general ticket.

== List of members representing the district ==
=== 1821–1847: one seat, then two, then five ===
| Cong ress | Years | Seat A | | | Seat B | | | Seat C | | | Seat D | | | Seat E | | |
| Cong ress | Years | Member | Party | Electoral history | Member | Party | Electoral history | Member | Party | Electoral history | Member | Party | Electoral history | Member | Party | Electoral history |
|---|---|---|---|---|---|---|---|---|---|---|---|---|---|---|---|---|
| 17th | August 10, 1821 – March 3, 1823 | John Scott (Ste. Genevieve) | Democratic-Republican (Note: Supported the Adams-Clay faction in the 1824 United States presidential election.) | Elected early in 1820. Re-elected in 1822. Re-elected in 1824. Lost re-election. | Second seat apportioned in 1833. | | | Third seat apportioned in 1843. | | | Fourth seat apportioned in 1843. | | | Fifth seat apportioned in 1843. | | |
| 18th | March 4, 1823 – March 3, 1825 | John Scott (Ste. Genevieve) | Democratic-Republican | Elected early in 1820. Re-elected in 1822. Re-elected in 1824. Lost re-election. | Second seat apportioned in 1833. | | | Third seat apportioned in 1843. | | | Fourth seat apportioned in 1843. | | | Fifth seat apportioned in 1843. | | |
| 19th | March 4, 1825 – March 3, 1827 | John Scott (Ste. Genevieve) | Anti-Jacksonian | Elected early in 1820. Re-elected in 1822. Re-elected in 1824. Lost re-election. | Second seat apportioned in 1833. | | | Third seat apportioned in 1843. | | | Fourth seat apportioned in 1843. | | | Fifth seat apportioned in 1843. | | |
| 20th | March 4, 1827 – March 3, 1829 | Edward Bates (St. Louis) | Anti-Jacksonian | Elected in 1826. Lost re-election. | Second seat apportioned in 1833. | | | Third seat apportioned in 1843. | | | Fourth seat apportioned in 1843. | | | Fifth seat apportioned in 1843. | | |
| 21st | March 4, 1829 – March 3, 1831 | Spencer D. Pettis (Fayette) | Jacksonian | Elected in 1828. Re-elected in 1831. Died. | Second seat apportioned in 1833. | | | Third seat apportioned in 1843. | | | Fourth seat apportioned in 1843. | | | Fifth seat apportioned in 1843. | | |
| 22nd | March 4, 1831 – August 28, 1831 | Spencer D. Pettis (Fayette) | Jacksonian | Elected in 1828. Re-elected in 1831. Died. | Second seat apportioned in 1833. | | | Third seat apportioned in 1843. | | | Fourth seat apportioned in 1843. | | | Fifth seat apportioned in 1843. | | |
| 22nd | August 28. 1831 – October 31, 1831 | Vacant | | | Second seat apportioned in 1833. | | | Third seat apportioned in 1843. | | | Fourth seat apportioned in 1843. | | | Fifth seat apportioned in 1843. | | |
| 22nd | October 31, 1831 – March 3, 1833 | William H. Ashley (St. Louis) | Jacksonian | Elected October 31, 1831 to finish Pettis's term and seated December 5, 1831. Re-elected in 1832. Re-elected in 1835. Retired to run for governor. | Second seat apportioned in 1833. | | | Third seat apportioned in 1843. | | | Fourth seat apportioned in 1843. | | | Fifth seat apportioned in 1843. | | |
| 23rd | March 4, 1833 – March 3, 1835 | William H. Ashley (St. Louis) | Jacksonian | Elected October 31, 1831 to finish Pettis's term and seated December 5, 1831. Re-elected in 1832. Re-elected in 1835. Retired to run for governor. | John Bull (Chariton) | Anti-Jacksonian | Elected in 1833. Retired. | Third seat apportioned in 1843. | | | Fourth seat apportioned in 1843. | | | Fifth seat apportioned in 1843. | | |
| 24th | March 4, 1835 – March 3, 1837 | William H. Ashley (St. Louis) | Jacksonian | Elected October 31, 1831 to finish Pettis's term and seated December 5, 1831. Re-elected in 1832. Re-elected in 1835. Retired to run for governor. | Albert G. Harrison (Fulton) | Jacksonian | Elected in 1835. Re-elected in 1836. Re-elected in 1838. Died. | Third seat apportioned in 1843. | | | Fourth seat apportioned in 1843. | | | Fifth seat apportioned in 1843. | | |
| 25th | March 4, 1837 – March 3, 1839 | John Miller (Conners Mill) | Democratic | Elected in 1836. Re-elected in 1838. Re-elected in 1840. Retired. | Albert G. Harrison (Fulton) | Democratic | Elected in 1835. Re-elected in 1836. Re-elected in 1838. Died. | Third seat apportioned in 1843. | | | Fourth seat apportioned in 1843. | | | Fifth seat apportioned in 1843. | | |
| 26th | March 4, 1839 – September 7, 1839 | John Miller (Conners Mill) | Democratic | Elected in 1836. Re-elected in 1838. Re-elected in 1840. Retired. | Albert G. Harrison (Fulton) | Democratic | Elected in 1835. Re-elected in 1836. Re-elected in 1838. Died. | Third seat apportioned in 1843. | | | Fourth seat apportioned in 1843. | | | Fifth seat apportioned in 1843. | | |
| 26th | September 7, 1839 – October 28, 1839 | John Miller (Conners Mill) | Democratic | Elected in 1836. Re-elected in 1838. Re-elected in 1840. Retired. | Vacant | | | Third seat apportioned in 1843. | | | Fourth seat apportioned in 1843. | | | Fifth seat apportioned in 1843. | | |
| 26th | October 28, 1839 – March 3, 1841 | John Miller (Conners Mill) | Democratic | Elected in 1836. Re-elected in 1838. Re-elected in 1840. Retired. | John Jameson (Fulton) | Democratic | Elected to finish Harrison's term and seated December 5, 1839. Retired. | Third seat apportioned in 1843. | | | Fourth seat apportioned in 1843. | | | Fifth seat apportioned in 1843. | | |
| 27th | March 4, 1841 – March 3, 1843 | John Miller (Conners Mill) | Democratic | Elected in 1836. Re-elected in 1838. Re-elected in 1840. Retired. | John C. Edwards (Jefferson City) | Democratic | Elected in 1840. Retired. | Third seat apportioned in 1843. | | | Fourth seat apportioned in 1843. | | | Fifth seat apportioned in 1843. | | |
| 28th | March 4, 1843 – March 3, 1845 | James B. Bowlin (St. Louis) | Democratic | Elected in 1842. Re-elected in 1844. Redistricted to the 1st district. | John Jameson (Fulton) | Democratic | Elected in 1842. Retired. | James Hugh Relfe (Caledonia) | Democratic | Elected in 1842. Re-elected in 1844. Retired. | Gustavus Miller Bower (Paris) | Democratic | Elected in 1842. Retired. | James Madison Hughes (Liberty) | Democratic | Elected in 1842. Retired. |
| 29th | March 4, 1845 – August 12, 1846 | James B. Bowlin (St. Louis) | Democratic | Elected in 1842. Re-elected in 1844. Redistricted to the 1st district. | Sterling Price (Keytesville) | Democratic | Elected in 1844. Resigned to serve in the Mexican–American War. | James Hugh Relfe (Caledonia) | Democratic | Elected in 1842. Re-elected in 1844. Retired. | Leonard H. Sims (Springfield) | Democratic | Elected in 1844. Retired. | John S. Phelps (Springfield) | Democratic | Elected in 1844. Redistricted to the 5th district. |
| 29th | August 12, 1846 – December 7, 1846 | James B. Bowlin (St. Louis) | Democratic | Elected in 1842. Re-elected in 1844. Redistricted to the 1st district. | Vacant | | | James Hugh Relfe (Caledonia) | Democratic | Elected in 1842. Re-elected in 1844. Retired. | Leonard H. Sims (Springfield) | Democratic | Elected in 1844. Retired. | John S. Phelps (Springfield) | Democratic | Elected in 1844. Redistricted to the 5th district. |
| 29th | December 7, 1846 – March 3, 1847 | James B. Bowlin (St. Louis) | Democratic | Elected in 1842. Re-elected in 1844. Redistricted to the 1st district. | William McDaniel (Palmyra) | Democratic | Elected to finish Price's term and seated December 7, 1846. Retired. | James Hugh Relfe (Caledonia) | Democratic | Elected in 1842. Re-elected in 1844. Retired. | Leonard H. Sims (Springfield) | Democratic | Elected in 1844. Retired. | John S. Phelps (Springfield) | Democratic | Elected in 1844. Redistricted to the 5th district. |

=== 1933–1935: thirteen seats ===
All seats elected at-large on a general ticket.

| Cong ress | Years | Seat A | | | Seat B | | | Seat C | | | Seat D | | |
| Cong ress | Years | Member | Party | Electoral history | Member | Party | Electoral history | Member | Party | Electoral history | Member | Party | Electoral history |
|---|---|---|---|---|---|---|---|---|---|---|---|---|---|
| 73rd | March 4, 1933 – January 3, 1935 | Milton A. Romjue (Macon) | Democratic | Redistricted from the 1st district and re-elected in 1932. Redistricted to the 1st district. | Ralph F. Lozier (Carrollton) | Democratic | Redistricted from the 2nd district and re-elected in 1932. Redistricted to the 2nd district but lost renomination. | Richard M. Duncan (St. Joseph) | Democratic | Elected in 1932. Redistricted to the 3rd district. | Jacob L. Milligan (Richmond) | Democratic | Redistricted from the 3rd district and re-elected in 1932. Redistricted to the 3rd district and retired to run for U.S. senator. |

| Cong ress | Years | Seat E | | | Seat F | | | Seat G | | | Seat H | | |
| Cong ress | Years | Member | Party | Electoral history | Member | Party | Electoral history | Member | Party | Electoral history | Member | Party | Electoral history |
|---|---|---|---|---|---|---|---|---|---|---|---|---|---|
| 73rd | March 4, 1933 – January 3, 1935 | Joe Shannon (Kansas City) | Democratic | Redistricted from the 5th district and re-elected in 1932. Redistricted to the 5th district. | Reuben T. Wood (Springfield) | Democratic | Elected in 1932. Redistricted to the 6th district. | Clement C. Dickinson (Clinton) | Democratic | Redistricted from the 6th district and re-elected in 1932. Redistricted to the 3rd district but lost renomination. | Clyde Williams (Hillsboro) | Democratic | Redistricted from the 13th district and re-elected in 1932. Redistricted to the 8th district. |

| Cong ress | Years | Seat I | | | Seat J | | | Seat K | | | Seat L | | |
| Cong ress | Years | Member | Party | Electoral history | Member | Party | Electoral history | Member | Party | Electoral history | Member | Party | Electoral history |
|---|---|---|---|---|---|---|---|---|---|---|---|---|---|
| 73rd | March 4, 1933 – January 3, 1935 | Clarence Cannon (Elsberry) | Democratic | Redistricted from the 9th district and re-elected in 1932. Redistricted to the 9th district. | Frank H. Lee (Joplin) | Democratic | Elected in 1932. Redistricted to the 7th district but lost re-election. | James Edward Ruffin (Springfield) | Democratic | Elected in 1932. Redistricted to the 3rd district but lost renomination. | James Robert Claiborne (St. Louis) | Democratic | Elected in 1932. Redistricted to the 12th district. |

| Cong ress | Years | Seat M | | |
| Cong ress | Years | Member | Party | Electoral history |
|---|---|---|---|---|
| 73rd | March 4, 1933 – January 3, 1935 | John J. Cochran (St. Louis) | Democratic | Redistricted from the 11th district and re-elected in 1932. Redistricted to the 13th district. |
