= Leonard H. Sims =

American politician

Leonard Henly Sims

Member of the U.S. House of Representatives from Missouri's at-large district
- In office March 4, 1845 – March 3, 1847
- Preceded by: Gustavus M. Bower
- Succeeded by: District eliminated

Personal details
- Born: February 6, 1807 Burke County, North Carolina
- Died: February 28, 1886 (aged 79) Batesville, Arkansas
- Party: Democratic

Leonard Henly Sims (February 6, 1807 – February 28, 1886) was a U.S. representative from Missouri.

Born in Burke County, North Carolina, Sims received a limited schooling. He moved to Rutherford County, Tennessee, in 1830 and engaged in agricultural pursuits. He served as member of the Tennessee House of Representatives for two terms. He settled near Springfield, Missouri, in 1839 and continued agricultural pursuits. He served as member of the Missouri State house of representatives 1842–1846.

Sims was elected as a Democrat to the Twenty-ninth Congress (March 4, 1845 – March 3, 1847). He returned to Rutherford County, Tennessee, in 1847 and continued farming. He moved to Independence County, Arkansas, in 1859, settled on a farm near Batesville, and engaged in cotton raising and farming. He served in the Arkansas State Senate from 1866 to 1870 and 1874 to 1878. His photograph was included in a montage of 1866-1867 state senators in Arkansas. He died on his plantation near Batesville, Arkansas, February 28, 1886. He was interred in the family plot on his farm.

== Additional sources ==
- Library of Congress
- Kipnotes
- United States Congress. "Leonard H. Sims (id: S000440)". Biographical Directory of the United States Congress.

U.S. House of Representatives
Preceded by Gustavus Miller Bower	Member of the U.S. House of Representatives from Missouri's at-large congressional district 1845-1847	Succeeded by None (district dissolved)
