= James H. Relfe =

American politician (1791–1863)

Member of the U.S. House of Representatives from Minnesota's at-large district
- In office March 4, 1843 – March 3, 1847
- Preceded by: New seat
- Succeeded by: District dissolved

Member of the Minnesota House of Representatives
- In office 1835–1844

Personal details
- Born: James Hugh Relfe; October 17, 1791 Virginia, U.S.
- Died: September 14, 1863 (aged 71) Caledonia, Missouri, U.S.
- Resting place: Methodist Cemetery
- Party: Democratic
- Relatives: Lewis F. Linn (brother-in-law)
- Occupation: Politician, physician

Military service
- Allegiance: United States
- Battles/wars: Black Hawk War

James Hugh Relfe (October 17, 1791 – September 14, 1863) was a U.S. Representative from Missouri.

Born in Virginia, Relfe moved to Washington County, Missouri, about 1816 with his father, who settled in Caledonia. He received a limited schooling. He studied medicine and practiced in Caledonia, Missouri. He was appointed a member of the commission to adjust Spanish land claims to fill the vacancy occasioned by the resignation of his brother-in-law, Dr. Lewis F. Linn. He served as member of the State house of representatives 1835-1844. He served in the Black Hawk War. He was appointed United States marshal for the district of Missouri February 17, 1841.

Relfe was elected as a Democrat to the Twenty-eighth and Twenty-ninth Congresses (March 4, 1843 – March 3, 1847). He continued the practice of medicine in Caledonia, Washington County, Missouri, until his death there September 14, 1863. He was interred in the Methodist Cemetery.

U.S. House of Representatives
Preceded by None (New seat)	Member of the U.S. House of Representatives from Missouri's at-large congressional district 1843-1847	Succeeded by None (District dissolved)
