= Thomas J. Halsey =

American politician (1863–1951)

Thomas Jefferson Halsey
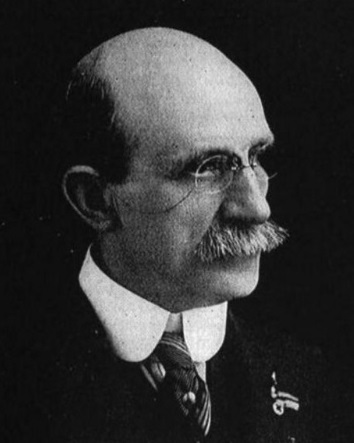
- Halsey in 1918

Member of the U.S. House of Representatives from Missouri's 6th district
- In office March 4, 1929 – March 3, 1931
- Preceded by: Clement C. Dickinson
- Succeeded by: Clement C. Dickinson

Personal details
- Born: Thomas Jefferson Halsey; May 4, 1863 Dover, New Jersey, US
- Died: March 17, 1951 (aged 87) Westfield, New Jersey, US
- Party: Republican
- Occupation: Politician

Thomas Jefferson Halsey (May 4, 1863 – March 17, 1951) was an American politician who served as a member of the U.S. House of Representatives from Missouri's 6th congressional district from 1929 to 1931.

Born in Dover, New Jersey, to T. J. Halsey and Sarah Burt Halsey, he was presumably named for President Thomas Jefferson. In 1878, he and his family moved onto a grain farm near Holden, Missouri. He was educated at public and private schools, and studied at the University of Missouri and the State Normal School. He worked as an educator between 1880 and 1881, and as a merchant in 1882.

Halsey was a member of the Republican committee of Missouri from 1896 to 1898, and a delegate to the state Republican convention in 1896, 1908, and 1912. From 1902 to 1904, he served as mayor of Holden; he moved to Sedalia after his term, where he worked as a businessman. Between 1906 and 1910, he was a member of the Missouri State Roads Commission. He briefly lived in Glendale, California in 1910, then returned to join the Holden Board of Education until 1912. From 1928 to 1932, he was a member of the State Normal School board of regents.

In 1928, Halsey was elected as a Republican to the 71st United States Congress. He served from March 4, 1929, to March 3, 1931, the only elected office he ever held. In Congress, he was noted for his agricultural policy, with him conferencing with the United States Department of Agriculture. His views skewed toward the benefit of consumers, such as in 1929, when he voted against an agricultural tariff, and in 1930, when he investigated margarine manufacturers.

Halsey lost reelection to his predecessor, Clement C. Dickinson, in 1930. Following his tenure, he resumed his work as a businessman in Holden. He died on March 17, 1951, aged 87, in Westfield, New Jersey, where he had lived with his son since 1948. He is buried at the Holden Cemetery.

== Electoral history ==
Electoral history of Thomas J. Halsey
Year	Office		Party	Votes			Result	Swing	Ref.
Year	Office		Party	Total	%	P.	Result	Swing	Ref.
1928	U.S. House	6th	Republican	30,557	53.24	1st	Won	Gain	
1930	U.S. House	6th	Republican	20,249	44.97	2nd	Lost	Gain	
Source: Clerk of the U.S. House | Election Statistics

U.S. House of Representatives
Preceded by Clement C. Dickinson	United States Representative for the 6th congressional district of Missouri; 1929–1931	Succeeded by Clement C. Dickinson
