= William McDaniel (politician) =

American politician

Member of the U.S. House of Representatives from Missouri's at-large district
- In office December 7, 1846 – March 4, 1847
- Preceded by: Sterling Price
- Succeeded by: District dissolved

Personal details
- Born: 1801 Grayson County, Kentucky, U.S.
- Died: December 14, 1866 (aged 64–65) Lewiston, Idaho, U.S.
- Party: Democratic

William McDaniel (1801 – December 14, 1866) was an American banker who served briefly as a U.S. representative from Missouri from 1846 to 1847. He was an early pioneer in the city of Vacaville, California.

== Life ==
=== Missouri ===
Born in Grayson County, Kentucky, McDaniel moved to Missouri in the late 1820s. He served as member of the State senate in 1838 and 1840. He served in the Missouri Volunteers during the Seminole War. McDaniel was elected president of the bank in Palmyra, Missouri, on December 9, 1840.

McDaniel was elected as a Democrat to the Twenty-ninth Congress to fill the vacancy caused by the resignation of Sterling Price and served from December 7, 1846, to March 4, 1847.

He was operating an agency for the location of land claims at Palmyra on June 10, 1847.

=== California ===
He moved to Solano County, California, and laid out the town of Vacaville. A written agreement was signed on December 13, 1851, forming a township for Vacaville, nine square miles of land were deeded to William McDaniel for three thousand dollars, and the original city plans were laid out from that. In the agreement, McDaniel's would name the new town after the Mexican land grant owner, Juan Manuel Cabeza Vaca.

He moved to Humboldt County, California, and established the land office at Humboldt Point in 1858.

=== Idaho ===
He moved to the Idaho Territory in 1863 where he practiced law and was associated with the land office.

== Death ==
He died in Lewiston, Idaho, on December 14, 1866.

U.S. House of Representatives
| Preceded by Sterling Price | Member of the U.S. House of Representatives from Missouri's at-large congressional district 1846–1847 | Succeeded by None (District dissolved) |
