= 1836 Missouri gubernatorial election =

- August 1, 1836
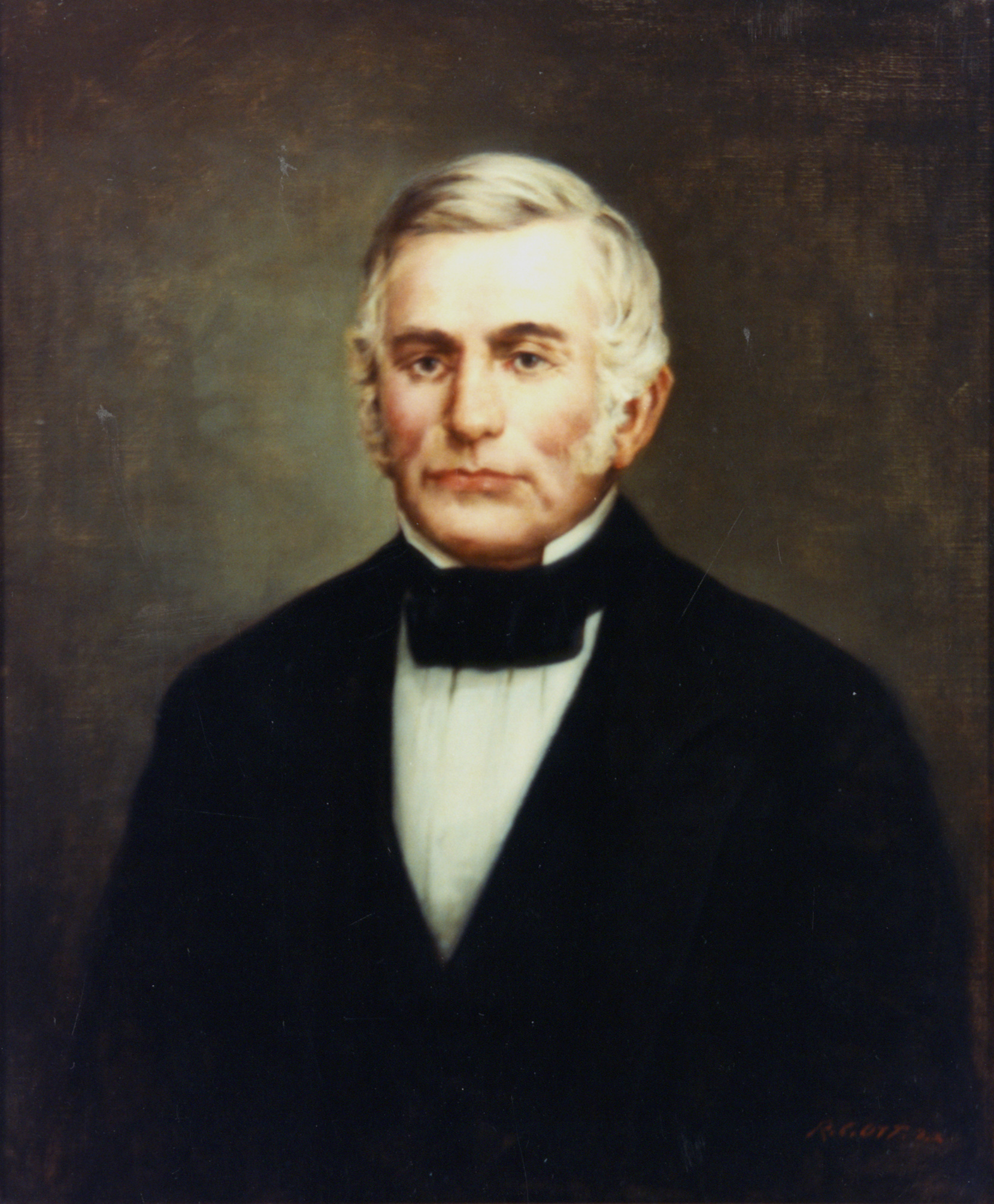

Nominee	Lilburn Boggs	William Henry Ashley
Party	Democratic	Independent
Popular vote	14,315	13,057
Percentage	52.30%	47.70%
- County results Boggs: 50–60% 60–70% 70–80% 80–90% >90% Ashley: 50–60% 60–70% 70–80% 80–90% Tie: 50% No data
Governor before election
Daniel Dunklin
Democratic
Elected Governor
Lilburn Boggs
Democratic

The 1836 Missouri gubernatorial election was held on August 1, 1836. Sitting Lt. Governor Lilburn Boggs, was elected over sitting Congressman (and former Lt. Governor) William Henry Ashley.

== General election ==
=== Candidates ===
- William Henry Ashley, U.S. Representative from St. Louis (representing Missouri at-large) and former Lieutenant Governor (Jacksonian Independent)
- Lilburn Boggs, Lieutenant Governor of Missouri (Democratic)

=== Results ===
1836 gubernatorial election, Missouri
Party	Candidate	Votes	%	±%
Democratic	Lilburn Boggs	14,315	52.30	+1.45
Independent	William Henry Ashley	13,057	47.70	
Majority		1,258	4.60	
Turnout		27,372	19.49	
Democratic hold		Swing		
