= 1832–33 United States House of Representatives elections in Missouri =

United States House of Representatives elections in Missouri, 1832 and 1833
- August 5, 1832 and August 6, 1833

Both of Missouri's seats to the United States House of Representatives
	First party	Second party	Third party
Party	Jacksonian	Anti-Jacksonian	Independent
Last election	1	0	0
Seats won	1	1	0
Seat change	Steady	▲1	Steady
Popular vote	20,055	4,063	2,130
Percentage	76.4%	15.5%	8.1%

Elections to the House of Representatives in Missouri for the 23rd Congress were held August 5, 1832 and August 6, 1833, for two Representatives. Unusually, rather than a single election for both seats, the second seat was elected a year after the first.

== Background ==
In the 22nd Congress, Missouri had been represented by a single Representative elected at-large. With reapportionment following the census of 1830, Missouri's representation increased to 2 representatives. Going into the election, Missouri was represented by William H. Ashley (J), who had been elected in a special election held in 1831.

== 1832 election ==
1832 United States House election results
Jacksonian
William H. Ashley (I)	7,868	60.6%
Robert W. Wells	5,127	39.4%

== 1833 election ==
1833 United States House election results
Jacksonian			Anti-Jacksonian			Independent		
George F. Strother	3,630	27.4%	John Bull	3,671	27.7%	James H. Birch	2,130	16.1%
George Shannon	3,430	25.9%	George Sibley	392	3.0%			
