= List of elections in 1832 =

The following elections occurred in the year 1832.

== Europe ==
=== United Kingdom ===
- 1832 United Kingdom general election
- 1832 United Kingdom general election in Ireland
- 1832 United Kingdom general election in Wales
  - List of MPs elected in the 1832 United Kingdom general election

== North America ==
=== Canada ===
- 1832 Newfoundland general election

=== United States ===
- 1832 United States elections

==== United States Presidential ====
- 1832 United States presidential election

==== United States Senate ====
- 1832 and 1833 United States Senate elections
- 1832–33 United States Senate election in Pennsylvania

==== United States House of Representatives ====
- 1832 United States House of Representatives elections

==== United States lieutenant gubernatorial ====
- 1832 Connecticut lieutenant gubernatorial election
- 1832 Missouri lieutenant gubernatorial election

==== United States gubernatorial ====
- 1832 Connecticut gubernatorial election
- 1832 Delaware gubernatorial election
- 1832 Kentucky gubernatorial election
- 1832 Maine gubernatorial election
- 1832 Maryland gubernatorial election
- 1832 Massachusetts gubernatorial election
- 1832 Missouri gubernatorial election
- 1832 New Hampshire gubernatorial election
- 1832 New Jersey gubernatorial election
- 1832 New York gubernatorial election
- 1832 North Carolina gubernatorial election
- 1832 Ohio gubernatorial election
- 1832 Pennsylvania gubernatorial election
- 1832 Rhode Island gubernatorial election
- 1832 South Carolina gubernatorial election
- 1832 Vermont gubernatorial election

==== United States mayoral elections ====
- 1832 Boston mayoral election

== See also ==
- Category:1832 elections
