= 1832 Missouri lieutenant gubernatorial election =

- August 6, 1832
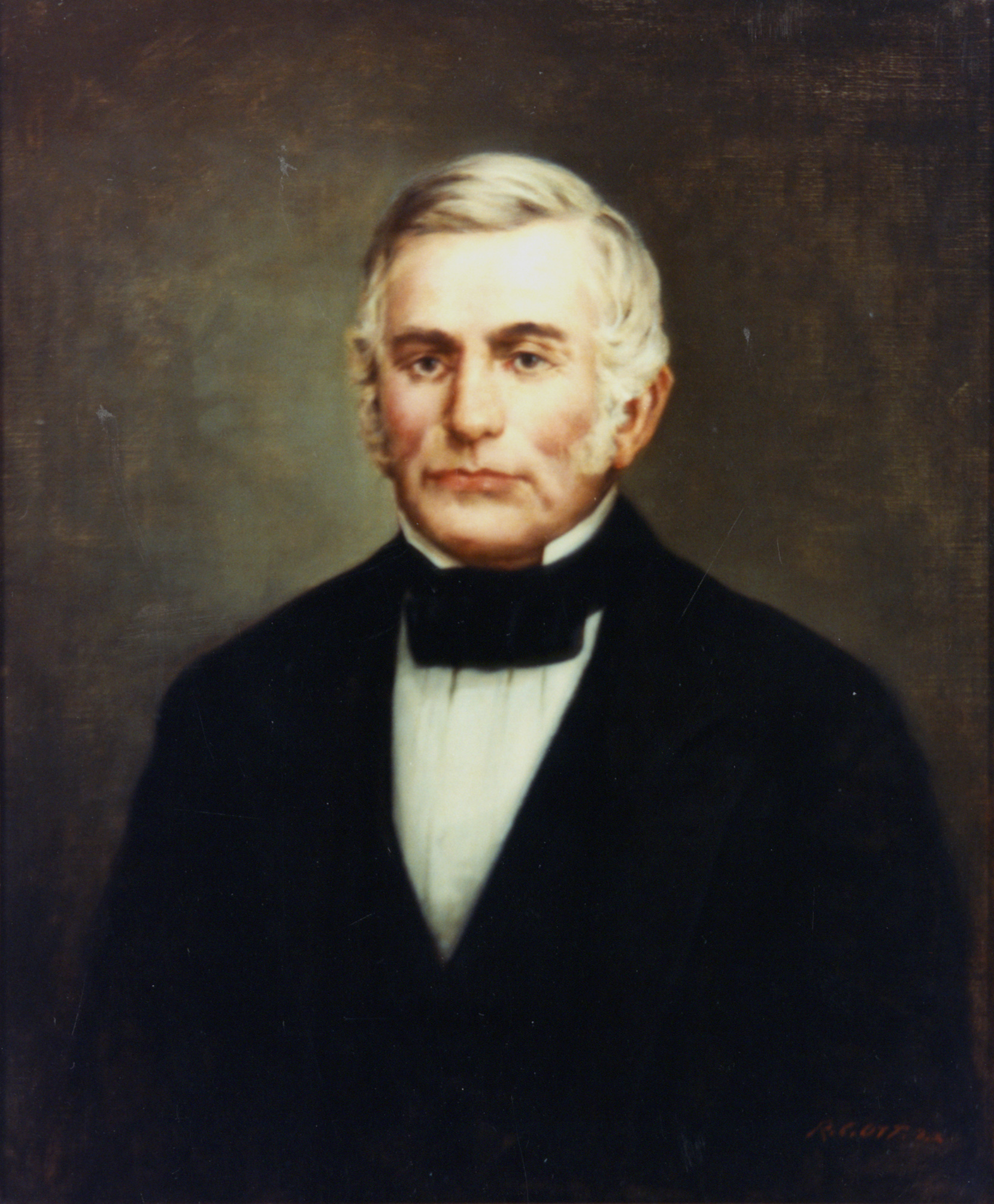

Nominee	Lilburn Boggs	James McClelland
Party	Democratic	National Republican
Popular vote	8,361	7,641
Percentage	52.25%	47.75%
Lieutenant Governor before election
Daniel Dunklin
Democratic
Elected Lieutenant Governor
Lilburn Boggs
Democratic

The 1832 Missouri lieutenant gubernatorial election was held on August 6, 1832, in order to elect the lieutenant governor of Missouri. Democratic nominee and incumbent member of the Missouri Senate Lilburn Boggs defeated National Republican nominee James McClelland.

== General election ==
On election day, August 6, 1832, Democratic nominee Lilburn Boggs won the election by a margin of 720 votes against his opponent National Republican nominee James McClelland, thereby retaining Democratic control over the office of lieutenant governor. Boggs was sworn in as the 4th lieutenant governor of Missouri on November 14, 1832.

=== Results ===
Missouri lieutenant gubernatorial election, 1832
Party	Candidate	Votes	%
Democratic	Lilburn Boggs	8,361	52.25
National Republican	James McClelland	7,641	47.75
Total votes		16,002	100.00
Democratic hold			

== See also ==
- 1832 Missouri gubernatorial election
