= Robert H. Carnahan =

American military colonel

Robert Huston Carnahan
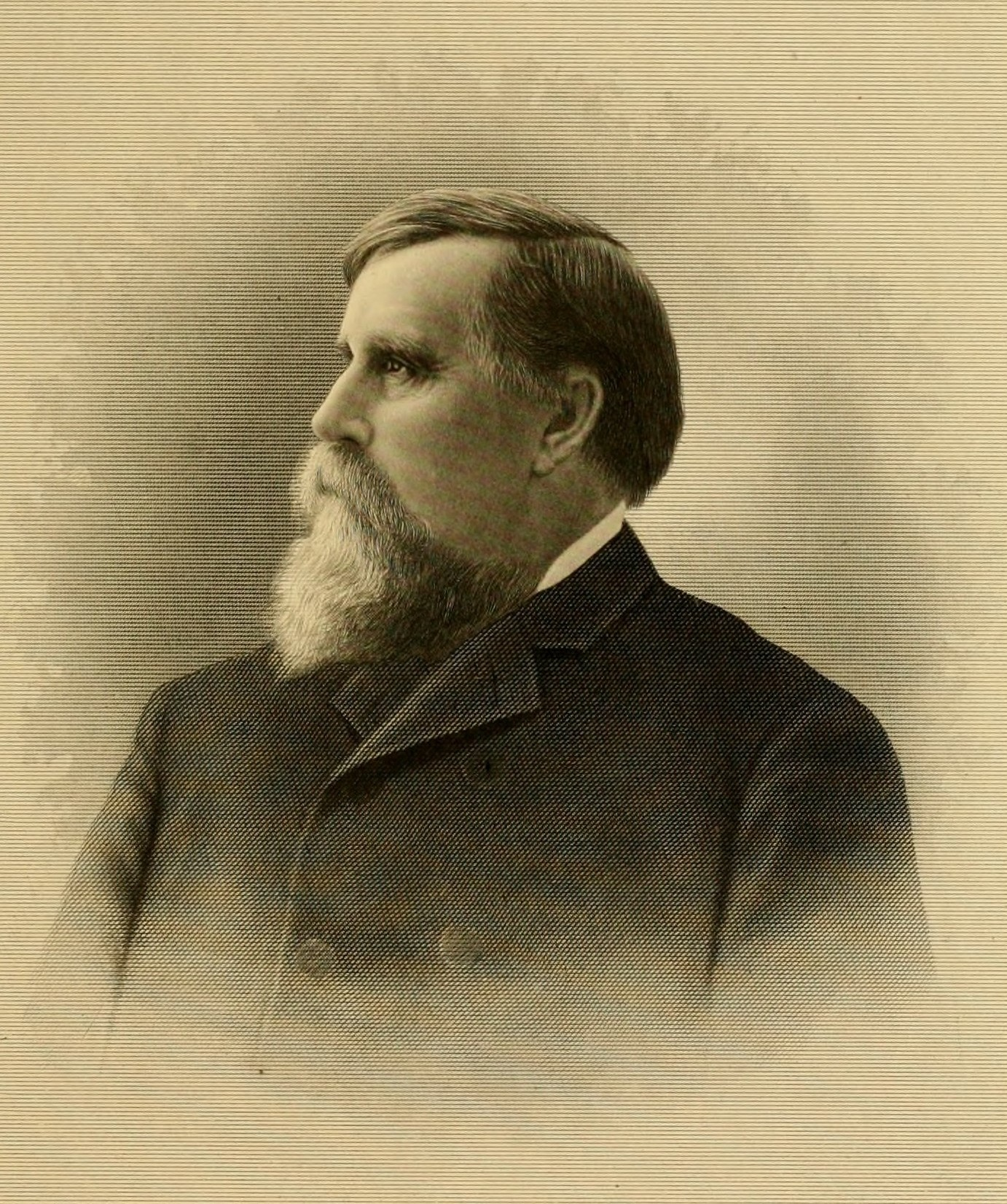
- Carnahan, c. 1903
- Born: September 21, 1823; Cumberland County, Pennsylvania, U.S.
- Died: June 14, 1913 (aged 89); Danville, Illinois, U.S.
- Burial place: Spring Hill Cemetery, Danville, Illinois
- Relatives: James Carnahan
- Military career
- Allegiance: United States
- Branch: United States Army; Union Army
- Service years: 1861–1865
- Rank: Colonel; Brevet Brigadier General
- Unit: 3rd Illinois Cavalry Regiment
- Conflicts: American Civil War; First Battle of Springfield; Vicksburg campaign; Siege of Vicksburg; Yazoo Pass expedition; Battle of Arkansas Post; Battle of Pea Ridge; Battle of Raymond; Battle of Champion Hill; Battle of Big Black River Bridge; Battle of Jackson; Red River campaign; Battle of Nashville
- Other work: assessor of internal revenue, superintendent, quartermaster

Robert Huston Carnahan (21 September 1823 in Cumberland County, Pennsylvania – 14 June 1913 in Danville, Illinois) was a Union Army officer during the Civil War. He was a grain merchant before the American Civil War and a superintendent of a coal mine after the war. He was appointed a captain of the 3rd Illinois Cavalry Regiment on August 24, 1861, lieutenant colonel on September 20, 1864, and colonel on April 9, 1865.

== Early life and family ==
Carnahan's lineage can be traced back to a man named Robert Carnahan, a Scottish–Irish soldier from the Continental Army who was detached by George Washington to guard the frontier against the Native Americans. His father, William Carnahan, was a cousin of James Carnahan.

William Carnahan was born in Cumberland county as was his first wife, Mary Houston and had two children, Robert and Andrew. He worked the farmlands to provide for his family until his removal westward. At twelve years old, he moved with his father somewhere in Fountain County, Indiana after his first wife died in 1824, where William married another woman, Margaret Cooper, and they had 5 children. He died in 1870 while his second wife died in 1882.

Robert rarely attended school, rather he remained in the home farm, being taught lessons by experience, until he was 25 years of age, where he moved out of town and worked as a clerk at a warehouse in Attica, Indiana and then purchased the business to become commission merchant. Carnahan married Miss Eliza Davis on January 1, 1849, a person from Newark, Ohio, and had two children, Clara and William McDowell. He continued working as commission merchant up until the inauguration of the American Civil War.

== Service ==
Carnahan signed up as a soldier for the Union army in 1861 at Fairbury, Illinois and became a member of the 3rd Illinois Cavalry Regiment under the command of the then Colonel Eugene A. Carr. He was commissioned captain of company K and was mustered at Camp Butler in Illinois by General Thomas Gamble Pitcher, after which the regiment went to St. Louis to join Major General John C. Frémont.

Carnahan's regiment served as part of General Fremont's campaign to re-capture Springfield, Missouri, from Confederate forces at the First Battle of Springfield. The regiment was engaged in scouting at the rear end of Springfield at the time when Charles Zagonyi charged upon the city. When the Union Army arrived in Springfield, only thirty families remained.

Later, the regiment proceeded to Pea Ridge where he became part of the Army of the Southwest led by Brigadier General Samuel Ryan Curtis and went to Helena, Arkansas. They were with General William T. Sherman during the Siege of Vicksburg and the Yazoo pass expedition. After the battle of Chickasaw Bayou, Carnahan went to Arkansas with Major General John A. McClernand and helped with the battle of Arkansas Post can captured five thousand prisoners. After the battle, they then proceeded to Young's Point where they went into camp. After the battle of Pea Ridge, Carnahan was appointed as captain in charge of a battalion and later joined the western army while Ulysses S. Grant took charge. Carnahan was appointed provost marshal on the staff of Brigadier General Osterhaus' division under command of McClernand in Vicksburg.

Following the surrender of Vicksburg, Carnahan continued to fight at the battles of Raymond, Champion Hill, and Big Black River and subsequently, the division was ordered to join Sherman, moving to Jackson, Mississippi and he fought at the battle of Jackson. After the surrender, Carnahan returned to Vicksburg where he was tasked by General Grant to report with General Nathaniel Banks from New Orleans with his cavalry division, where he joined the Red River expedition. After the campaign ended, he went with General William B. Franklin at the Bayou Teche campaign following which he was attached to McClernand's staff as the acting aide-de-camp of the Thirteenth Army Corps. He remained in command in a post and then later tasked to scout in western Kentucky, and then report to General Eleazar A. Paine in Paducah.

After three years, his term of service expired and reporting at Springfield, Illinois, he was given command of a veteran regiment of the Illinois Cavalry to fill up the quota. Carnahan's regiment served at the Battle of Nashville.

After the battle, Carnahan's regiment was sent to Saint Paul, Minnesota to join General Henry Hopkins Sibley and was given command to scout all over the Dakotas and Montana to deal with the Native Americans, until he returned to Fort Snelling at October 10, 1865, when he was honorably mustered out of the Union army.

== Later life and death ==
After being mustered out of the army, Carnahan went to Danville, Illinois and had a job as the assessor of internal revenue for two years. He then became a superintendent of a Moss Bank coal mine for twelve years. He was connected with that business after which he was chosen as quartermaster and worked as a commissary at the National Soldiers' Home in Quincy, Illinois at the opening of the institution for six years. He then retired and went back to Danville.

On 1865, Carnahan was nominated by Governor Richard J. Oglesby to be brevetted in recognition to his meritorious service at the Civil War. President Andrew Johnson nominated Carnahan for appointment to the grade of brevet brigadier general of volunteers, to rank from October 28, 1865, and the United States Senate confirmed the appointment on March 12, 1866.

Robert H. Carnahan died on June 14, 1913, at Danville, Illinois. He is buried at Spring Hill Cemetery, Danville.

== Personal life ==
Carnahan is said to be a stalwart Republican. He belongs to the Masonic Fraternity and had been a Freemason since 1865. He was awarded the Knights Templar degree at the commandery of Danville. He attended a local Presbyterian church with his wife.

== See also ==
- List of American Civil War brevet generals (Union)
