= Gov. Daniel Dunklin's Grave State Historic Site =

Historic cemetery in Herculaneum, Missouri, USA

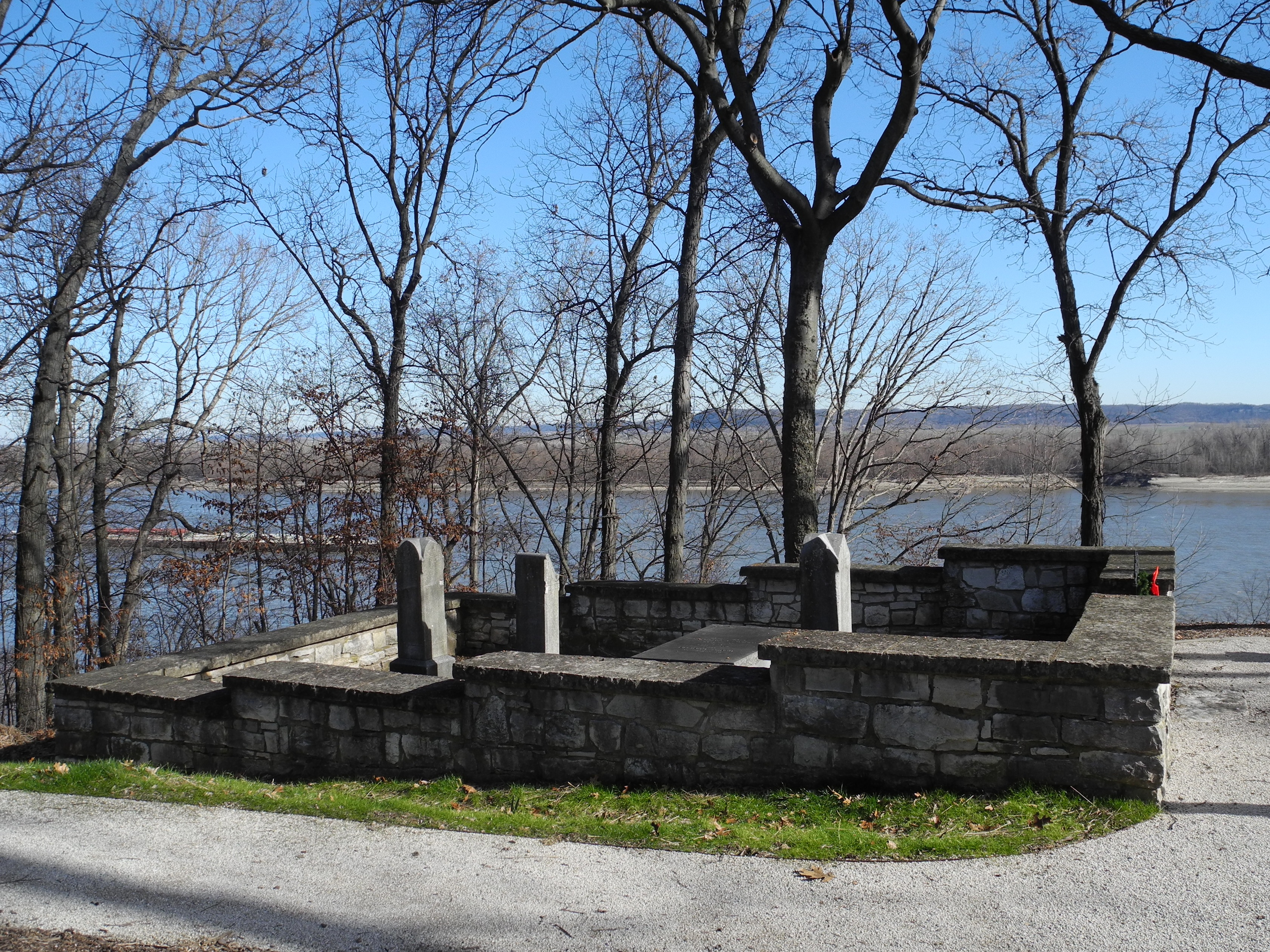

- Location within Missouri Location within the United States
- Location: Herculaneum, Missouri
- Coordinates: 38°16′52″N 90°22′40″W
- Area: 1.37 acres (0.55 ha)
- Established: 1965
- Visitors: 2,756 (in 2020)
- Governing body: Missouri Department of Natural Resources
- Website: Governor Daniel Dunklin’s Grave State Historic Site

Gov. Daniel Dunklin's Grave is a Missouri state park at Herculaneum, Missouri, preserving the gravesite of Daniel Dunklin, who was governor of Missouri during the mid-1830s. Dunklin died in 1844 and was buried on his family estate, but was reinterred in 1885 when most of the estate he was buried on was sold. In 1965, the state of Missouri took control of the site to serve as a memorial to Dunklin, who is credited as the father of Missouri's public education system. The site covers 1.37 acres (0.55 ha) and is operated by the Missouri Department of Natural Resources. The cemetery is surrounded by limestone walls and overlooks the Mississippi River.

== Background ==
Daniel Dunklin was born on January 14, 1790, in Greenville, South Carolina. He served as a militiaman during the War of 1812, and then entered politics in Washington County, Missouri in 1815. He held a seat in the Missouri House of Representatives in 1822 and 1823, before becoming the Lieutenant Governor of Missouri in 1828. Holding that position through 1832, Dunklin won the that year's Missouri gubernatorial election as a member of the Democratic Party. The Jefferson City News Tribune has credited Dunklin with "founding the state's public school system".

He resigned his position on September 30, 1836, and was appointed as a surveyor general in Illinois and Missouri. In 1840, Dunklin moved to the Herculaneum, Missouri, area. In 1843, he was appointed to help adjudge a boundary dispute between Missouri and Arkansas, and he died of pneumonia on July 25, 1844. He was buried on his family estate in Herculaneum. In 1885, Dunklin's son was forced to sell the estate, with only 1 acre (0.40 ha) remaining. The single acre became the Dunklin family cemetery, and the remains of Dunklin and his wife were moved there.

== Historic site ==
By 1951, the Tri-City Independent newspaper of Festus, Missouri, reported that Dunklin's grave site lay "neglected on a bluff". On August 25, 1965, the Missouri Parks Board accepted control of the site to maintain it as "a memorial park in remembrance of Daniel Dunklin". The acquisition foreran a 1967 state law requiring the state to ensure that the grave sites of all former state governors were marked, and to maintain those graves "not within a perpetual care cemetery". (Note: Missouri operates Jewell Cemetery State Historic Site and Sappington Cemetery State Historic Site for the latter purpose as well.)

The cemetery is run by the Missouri Department of Natural Resources. The park is located at 104 Dunklin Drive in Herculaneum, and administration of the site is run through Mastodon State Historic Site. The park has a overlook view of the Mississippi River. During 2020, 2,756 people visited the park, which had a single part-time staff worker. The site's budget was $2,515 and it covered 1.37 acres (0.55 ha). During 2020, the Missouri State Parks system held an archaeology demonstration at the location. The park, which is located on bluffs above the Mississippi, consists of the grave site surrounded by limestone walls. Intepretative signage is present.
