= Lilburn Boggs =

American politician (1796–1860)

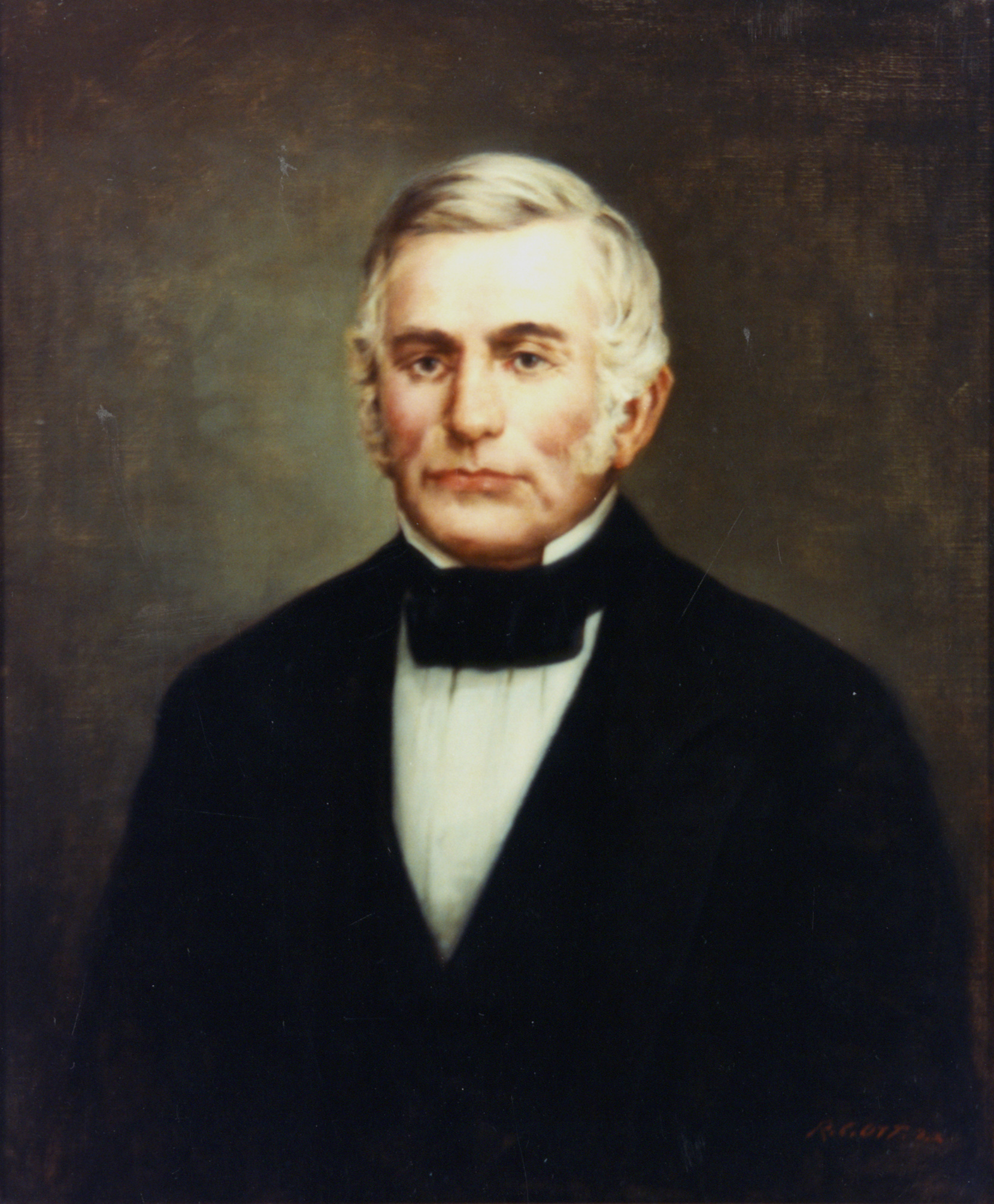
- Portrait by Ralph Chesley Ott, 1922

6th Governor of Missouri
- In office September 30, 1836 – November 16, 1840
- Lieutenant: Franklin Cannon
- Preceded by: Daniel Dunklin
- Succeeded by: Thomas Reynolds

4th Lieutenant Governor of Missouri
- In office November 19, 1832 – September 30, 1836
- Governor: Daniel Dunklin
- Preceded by: Daniel Dunklin
- Succeeded by: Franklin Cannon

Personal details
- Born: Lilburn Williams Boggs; December 14, 1796 Lexington, Kentucky, U.S.
- Died: March 14, 1860 (aged 63) Rancho Napa, California, U.S.
- Party: Democratic
- Relations: Joseph Boggs (uncle)

Military service
- Allegiance: United States
- Battles/wars: War of 1812

Lilburn Williams Boggs (December 14, 1796 – March 14, 1860) was the sixth governor of Missouri, from 1836 to 1840. He is now most widely remembered for his interactions with Joseph Smith and Porter Rockwell, and Missouri Executive Order 44, known as the "Extermination Order", issued in response to the ongoing conflict between Mormons and other settlers of Missouri. Boggs was also a key player in the Honey War of 1837.

== Early life ==
Boggs was born in Lexington, Fayette County, Kentucky, on December 14, 1796, to John McKinley Boggs and Martha Oliver. Boggs served for 18 months with the Kentucky troops during the War of 1812. He moved in 1816 from Lexington, Kentucky, to Missouri, which was then part of the Louisiana Territory. He was a member of the Smithton Company that would establish the Town of Smithton that would later grow into Columbia, Missouri.

In Greenup County, Kentucky, in 1817, Boggs married his first wife, Julia Ann Bent (1801–1820), a sister of the Bent brothers of Bent's Fort fame, and daughter of Silas Bent, then a judge in the Missouri Supreme Court. She died on September 21, 1820, in St Louis, Missouri. They had two children, Angus and Henry.

In 1823, Boggs married Panthea Grant Boone (1801–1880), a granddaughter of Daniel Boone, in Callaway County, Missouri. They spent most of the following twenty-three years in Jackson County, Missouri, where all but two of their many children were born.

Boggs started out as a clerk, then entered politics. He served as a Missouri state senator from 1825 to 1832; as lieutenant governor from 1832 to 1836; governor from 1836 to 1840; and again as state senator from 1842 to 1846. He was a Democrat.

== Extermination order ==
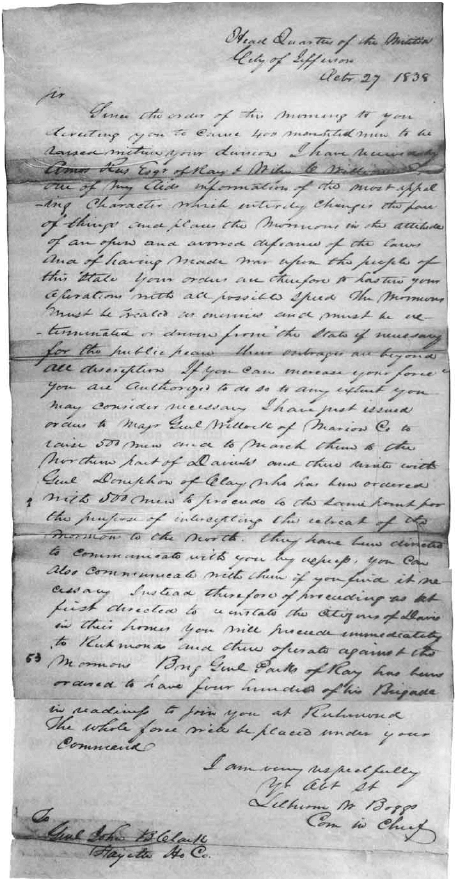
The handwritten executive order.

While governor of Missouri, Boggs issued Missouri Executive Order 44, a document known in Latter Day Saint history as the "Extermination Order". A response to the escalating threats and violence in what came to be known as the Missouri 1838 Mormon War, this executive order was issued on October 27, 1838, and called for Latter Day Saints to be driven from the state, because of what he termed their

...open and avowed defiance of the laws, and of having made war upon the people of this State ... the Mormons must be treated as enemies, and must be exterminated or driven from the State if necessary for the public peace—their outrages are beyond all description.

The order was rescinded on June 25, 1976, after nearly 138 years, by Missouri Governor Kit Bond, who declared that the original order violated legal rights established by the U.S. Constitution. In rescinding the order, Bond offered his regrets on behalf of the state.

== Assassination attempt ==
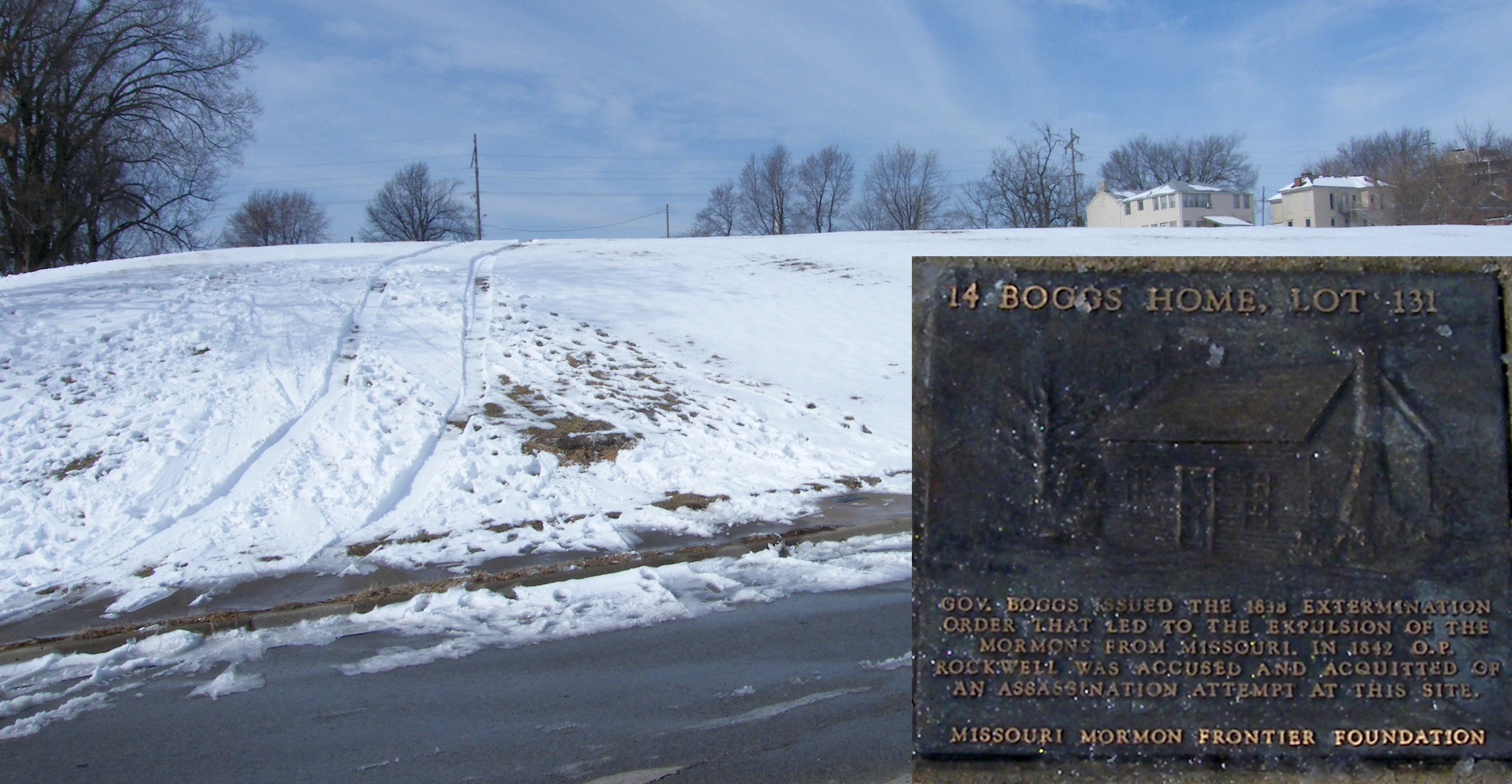
Marker on the Mormon Walking Tour commemorating the spot where Boggs' house was located. The marker is in a cleared patch of snow on the sidewalk (to the left of the blow up). The Independence Temple steeple can be seen in the trees at the top of the hill.

Boggs, who was from Independence, moved to a house within the City of Zion plot in Independence after the Mormons were evicted from Missouri and after he left office. His home was three blocks east of Temple Lot. On the rainy evening of May 6, 1842, Boggs was shot by an unknown party who fired at him through a window as he read a newspaper in his study. Boggs was hit by large buckshot in four places: two balls were lodged in his skull, another lodged in his neck, and a fourth entered his throat, whereupon Boggs swallowed it. Boggs was severely injured. Several doctors—including his brother—pronounced Boggs as good as dead; at least one newspaper ran an obituary. To everyone's great surprise, Boggs not only survived, but gradually improved.

The crime was investigated by Sheriff J.H. Reynolds, who discovered a revolver at the scene, still loaded with buckshot. He surmised that the suspect had fired upon Boggs and lost his firearm in the dark rainy night when the weapon recoiled due to its unusually large shot. The gun had been stolen from a local shopkeeper, who identified "that hired man of Ward's" as the "most likely culprit". Reynolds, then acting on the testimony of the storekeeper, determined that the man in question was Orrin Porter Rockwell, a close associate of Smith. Reynolds eventually caught Rockwell and held him for almost a year while he awaited trial. Reynolds could not produce any evidence that Rockwell was involved in any way and he was acquitted of all charges concerning Boggs, after prominent lawyer Alexander Doniphan agreed to defend him.

A few people saw the assassination attempt positively: an anonymous contributor to The Wasp, a pro-Mormon newspaper in Nauvoo, Illinois, that was run by Joseph Smith's brother, William Smith, wrote on May 28 that "Boggs is undoubtedly killed according to report; but who did the noble deed remains to be found out".

Rockwell denied involvement in oblique terms, stating that he had "done nothing criminal". Also at about this time, John C. Bennett reported that Smith had offered a cash reward to anyone who would assassinate Boggs, and that Smith had admitted to him that Rockwell had done the deed. He went on to say that Rockwell had made a veiled threat against Bennett's life if he publicized the story. Joseph Smith vehemently denied Bennett's account, speculating that Boggs — no longer governor, but campaigning for state senate — was attacked by an election opponent. Mormon writer Monte B. McLaws, in the Missouri Historical Review, supported Smith, averring that while there was no clear finger pointing to anyone, Governor Boggs was running for election against several violent men, all capable of the deed, and that there was no particular reason to suspect Rockwell of the crime. The following year Rockwell was arrested, tried, and acquitted of the attempted murder.

== California ==
Boggs traveled overland to California in 1846 and is frequently mentioned among the notable emigrants of that year. His traveling companions widely believed that his move was rooted in his fear of the Mormons. When the train set out in early May, he campaigned to be elected its captain, but lost to William H. Russell; when Russell resigned on June 18, the group was thereafter led by Boggs. Among the Boggs Company were most of the emigrants who later separated from the group to form the Donner Party.

Boggs was accompanied by his second wife, Panthea, and his younger children as well as his son, William, and William's bride, Sonora Hicklin. They arrived in Sonoma, California, in November and were provided refuge by Mariano Vallejo at his Petaluma ranch house. There, on January 4, 1847, Mrs. William Boggs gave birth to a son, who was named Mariano Guadalupe Vallejo Boggs after their benefactor. Lilburn Boggs became alcalde of the Sonoma district in 1847. During the California Gold Rush, Boggs owned a store and did quite well. On November 8, 1849, Boggs resigned as alcalde and became the town's postmaster.

Boggs was elected to the California State Assembly from the Sonoma District in 1852.

In 1855, he retired to live at Rancho Napa in Napa County, California, where he died on March 14, 1860. His widow Panthea died in Napa County, California, on September 23, 1880. They are buried in Tulocay Cemetery, Napa, California.

His son, Theodore Boggs, would later found the town of Big Bug, Arizona, where he fought Apaches during a small encounter at the Big Bug mine.

== Sources ==
- Boggs, William M. A Short Biographical Sketch of Lilburn W. Boggs, by his son.
- Bushman, Richard. Joseph Smith: Rough Stone Rolling., Alfred Knopf, 2005; ISBN 1-4000-4270-4
- Johnson, Kristin. "Lilburn W. Boggs". In Unfortunate Emigrants: Narratives of the Donner Party. Logan, Utah: Utah State University Press, 1996.
- LeSueur, Stephen C. The 1838 Mormon War in Missouri. Columbia: University of Missouri Press, 1990.
- McLaws, Monte B. "The Attempted Assassination of Missouri's Ex-Governor, Lilburn W. Boggs". Missouri Historical Review, 60.1 (October 1965).
- Schindler, Harold. Orrin Porter Rockwell: Man of God, Son of Thunder. Salt Lake City: University of Utah Press, 1966.
- Sonoma County Genealogical Society. Portraits of Early Sonoma County Settlers, pp. 12–24. Santa Rosa, California: Caiifornia Genealogical Society, 2016; ISBN 9781365131264

Political offices
Preceded by Daniel Dunklin	Lieutenant Governor of Missouri; 1832–1836	Succeeded by Franklin Cannon
Preceded by Daniel Dunklin	Governor of Missouri; 1836–1840	Succeeded by Thomas Reynolds
Party political offices
Preceded by Daniel Dunklin	Democratic nominee for Governor of Missouri; 1836	Succeeded by Thomas Reynolds
