= First Battle of Springfield =

Battle of the Trans-Mississippi Theater of the American Civil War

- Part of the Trans-Mississippi Theater of the American Civil War
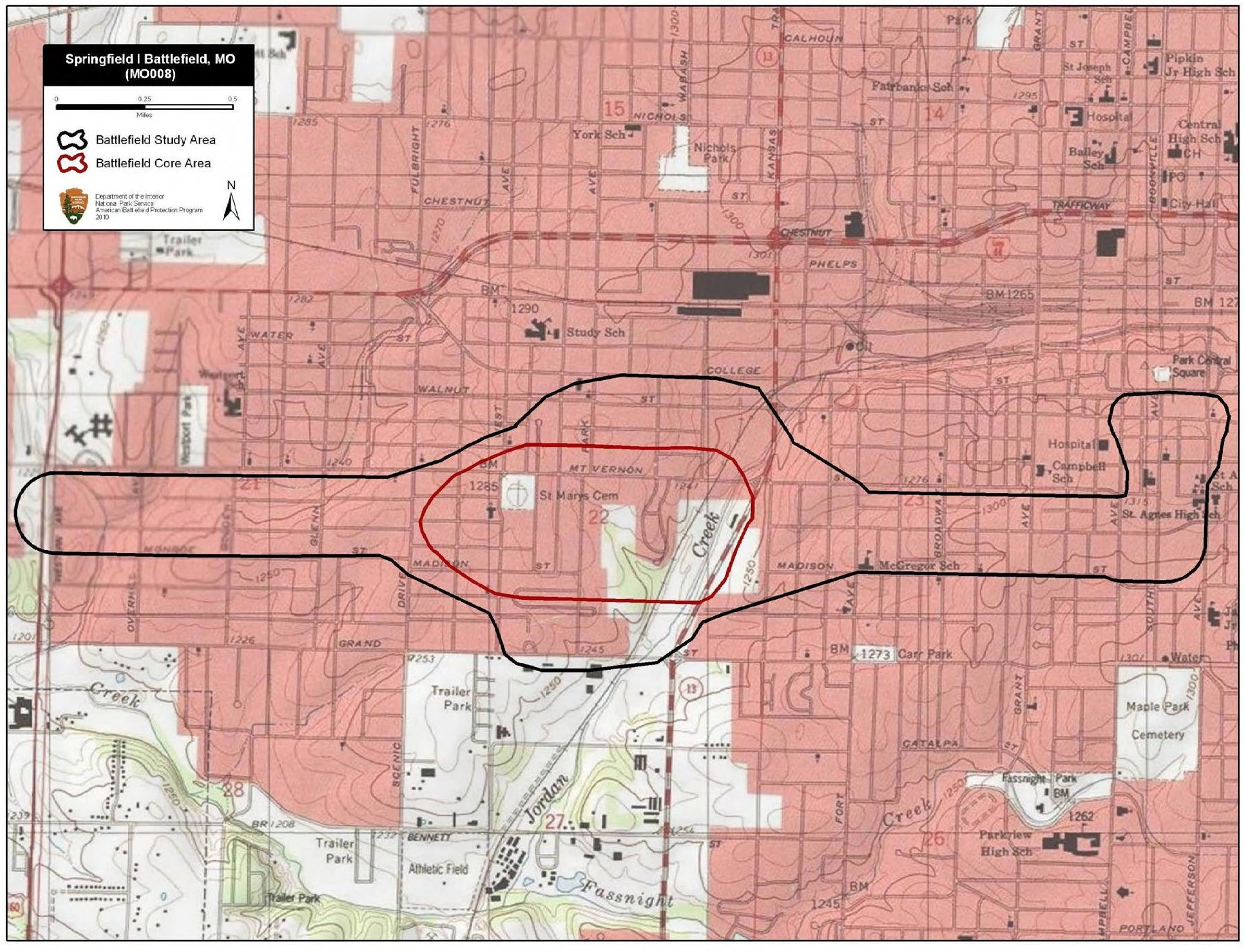
- Springfield Battlefield
Date	October 25, 1861
Location	Springfield, Missouri 37°12′12.6″N 93°19′13.8″W
Result	Union victory

Belligerents
United States (Union)	Missouri (Confederate)

Commanders and leaders
(United States) Charles Zagonyi	Julian Frazier

Units involved
Frémont's Body-Guard; Prairie Scouts	Missouri State Guard

Strength
c. 300	c. 1,000
- Location within Missouri

The First Battle of Springfield was a battle of the American Civil War that took place on October 25, 1861, near Springfield, Missouri. Following the Battle of Wilson's Creek, the Missouri State Guard, a pro-Confederate militia organization, drove north and defeated Union forces in the Siege of Lexington. Following the fighting at Lexington, Union Major General John C. Frémont began a campaign that drove into southern Missouri. The main body of the Missouri State Guard fell back to Neosho, but a body of roughly 1,000 or 1,500 new recruits commanded by Colonel Julian Frazier was at Springfield. On October 24, Frémont sent a force raised as his bodyguard commanded by Major Charles Zagonyi on a scouting mission towards Springfield. After joining a cavalry force known as the Prairie Scouts at Bolivar, Zagonyi moved on towards Springfield on October 25.

Having lost the element of surprise in a clash with a small group of Missouri State Guardsmen, Zagonyi detoured his men to the west. At around 4:00 p.m., Zagonyi's men encountered Frazier's command. The Missouri State Guardsmen had taken up a defensive position on a partially wooded ridge. The exact details of the battle are unknown, but Zagonyi's men drove off Frazier's troops before entering Springfield and withdrawing north at around the time darkness fell. Zagonyi's post-battle report was intentionally inaccurate and was designed to inflate the contributions of his own troops at the expense of the Prairie Scouts. The action accomplished very little, and Union troops occupied Springfield again two days later. Frémont was relieved of command in early November, and his successor called off the campaign and withdrew, allowing the Missouri State Guard to reoccupy Springfield, although they were driven out of Missouri in early 1862.

== Prelude ==
Early in the American Civil War, conflict broke out between United States Union forces and state authorities in Missouri. On May 10, 1861, Union Brigadier General Nathaniel Lyon captured an encampment of militia sent by Missouri's pro-Confederate governor Claiborne Fox Jackson in the Camp Jackson affair. Jackson responded by creating a new pro-Confederate militia force, the Missouri State Guard, and named Sterling Price the Guard's commander. Price, Lyon, and Jackson attended a meeting at the Planter's House Hotel on June 11, at the end of which Lyon declared that a state of open war had begun. Lyon then began an offensive that took control of the state capital of Jefferson City, and drove the Missouri State Guard from the Missouri River Valley. For a time Union operations in Missouri were part of the purview of the Department of the Ohio, but on July 1 the Department of the West, which included Missouri, was created, and placed under the command of Major General John C. Frémont two days later.

Frémont arrived in Missouri on July 25. He brought with him a number of foreign-born officers, one of whom was the Hungarian Major Charles Zagonyi, (Note: Zagonyi's first name was rendered in Hungarian as Károly.) who recruited a cavalry unit intended to serve as a bodyguard for Frémont. This unit was known as the Body-Guard. While Frémont focused on events near Cairo, Illinois, Lyon operated in southwestern Missouri. On August 10, Lyon was killed and his army defeated while fighting a mixed Confederate States Army and Missouri State Guard force at the Battle of Wilson's Creek. While the Confederate forces returned to Arkansas after Wilson's Creek, Price moved his militia north to the Missouri River town of Lexington. Frémont's response to Price's incursion was ineffective, and the Siege of Lexington ended with a Union surrender on September 20.

In response to the fall of Lexington, Frémont developed an unrealistic offensive plan that involved a thrust all the way down to New Orleans, Louisiana. His force outnumbered Price about 38,000 men to 18,000 men. As Union troops gathered at Georgetown, Missouri, Price fell back without interference from Frémont's army. On October 20, Price's men reached Neosho, Missouri. Previously, Frémont had upset the Union government with the impolitic Frémont Emancipation (Note: The Frémont Emancipation declared martial law in Missouri, allowed for the confiscation of the property of individuals who were or had been members of military organizations in opposition to the United States (including the freeing of their slaves), and citizens caught bearing weapons behind Union lines were subject to court martials and potentially the death penalty. This proclamation ran counter to an amnesty proclamation issued by Missouri Governor Hamilton R. Gamble (who had been appointed as the governor of the pro-Union portion of the Missouri government after Jackson and the secessionists abandoned Jefferson City) and various federal statements and policies. (Note: Parrish)) and political troubles dogged his campaign. Accusations of contractor graft during the mobilization of his army (particularly from associates of Congressman Francis Preston Blair Jr. who felt that they should have been receiving government contracts) and a negative report from Adjutant General of the U.S. Army Lorenzo Thomas made the situation worse for Frémont. On October 8, United States Secretary of War Simon Cameron had journeyed to St. Louis to investigate the charges against Frémont, with the authority to relieve him of command at Cameron's discretion. Cameron met with Frémont and showed him the orders relieving him; in turn Frémont asked for a chance to fight a battle against Price. Cameron returned to Washington, D.C. without relieving Frémont. Frémont had been informed that failure would result in his dismissal. Frémont's troops began moving south soon after the meeting between their commander and Cameron.

== Battle ==
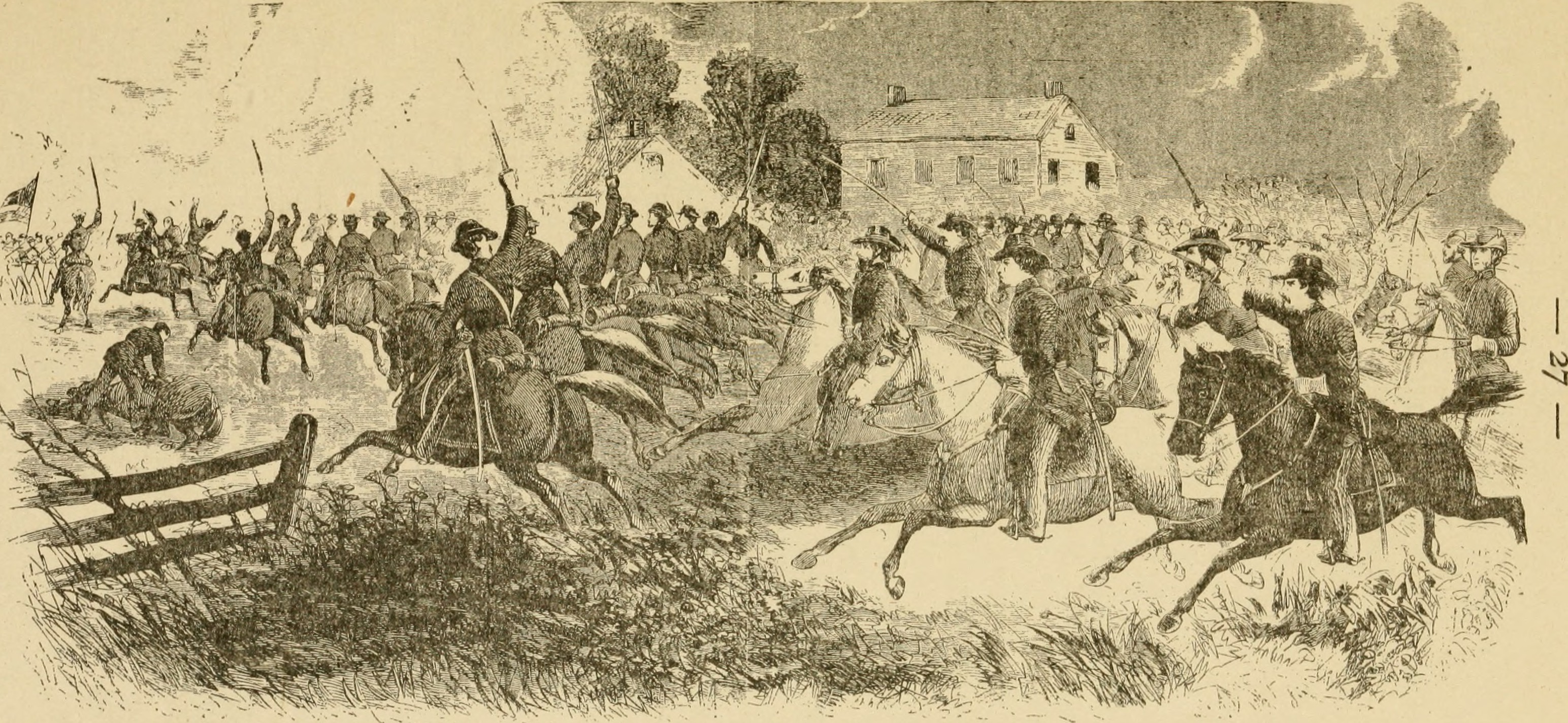
Zagonyi's "death attack" at Springfield, October 25th.

At 11:00 pm on October 24, Zagonyi and 150 men of the Body-Guard left their camp at Yoast's Station (an abandoned site associated with the Butterfield Overland Mail Route) to move towards Springfield. Another of Frémont's cavalry units was Major Frank J. White's Prairie Scouts, who had recently ridden nearly 170 miles in eight days, having raided Lexington and then moved south to Quincy. (Note: The historian Robert E. Miller states that the Prairie Scouts were a cavalry force drawn from two companies of the 3rd Illinois Cavalry Regiment and one from the 23rd Illinois Infantry Regiment, while noting that an early 20th-century work by Howard L. Conard identified the 3rd Illinois companies as being from the 1st Missouri Cavalry. The historian Gregoy Wolk states that the Prairie Scouts were composed of troops from the 1st Missouri Cavalry and an additional company recruited for the relief of the siege of Lexington which Wolk does not name.) The Prairie Scouts left Elkton, Missouri, where White had received orders from Brigadier General Franz Sigel to join Zagonyi, late on October 24. White reported that his command numbered 154 men at this time. Reaching Bolivar the next day, Zagonyi joined forces with the Prairie Scouts, although White was sick and followed in a carriage.

Defending Springfield was a collection of new Missouri State Guard recruits commanded by Colonel Julian Frazier. The historian Louis Gerteis states that Frazier had an effective force of about 1,000 badly armed and trained men, although Zagonyi believed he faced 2,000 to 2,200 enemy soldiers. The historian Gregoy Wolk notes that the strength of the Missouri State Guard forces is disputed, noting that the de facto official figure is now the National Park Service's figure of 1,500 soldiers. Wolk identifies the breakdown of the Missouri State Guard forces as 300 recent infantry recruits (some of whom were unarmed and the rest armed only with civilian weapons), a cavalry unit commanded by Frazier, and another cavalry unit commanded by Colonel John Johnson (which had around 300 soldiers and had recently been engaged in a sharp fight in Camden County). Frazier was the senior officer present. The Missouri State Guardsmen were encamped near the local fairgrounds, which was 4 miles (6.4 km) west of the Springfield city square along the south side of the Mount Vernon Road. East of the fairgrounds was a patch of woods, which itself was bounded on the east by a field. The field was on a slope, with a stream at the base of the slope. The historian Robert E. Miller identifies the brook as Crane Creek. South of the field and fairgrounds, a smaller road ran parallel to the main road. The Missouri State Guardsmen were east of the woods, with the infantry on the west side of the encampment and the cavalry on the east.

Zagonyi led about 300 men in his movement. While still 8 miles (13 km) away from Springfield, the Union soldiers ran into a small party of Missouri State Guardsmen, one of whom escaped back to Springfield to sound the alarm. With the element of surprise now lost for an attack from the north, Zagonyi swung his troops to approach Springfield from the west. Unaware that Zagonyi had changed course, White later arrived from the north and was captured. At around 4:00 p.m., the Union cavalry encountered Frazier's position, which was on a partially wooded ridge. Union scouts were concerned that the fencing along the Mount Vernon Road would excessively impede maneuvers, so Zagonyi led the Union cavalry south through the fairgrounds to the smaller southern road. Zagonyi aligned his men for a charge and, according to Miller, Zagonyi told his men that any who did not want to participate in the attack would be excused. Miller also states that Zagonyi gave "Fremont and the Union" as a watchword, although the historian Stephen Z. Starr does not believe Zagonyi's claim to have used this battle cry.

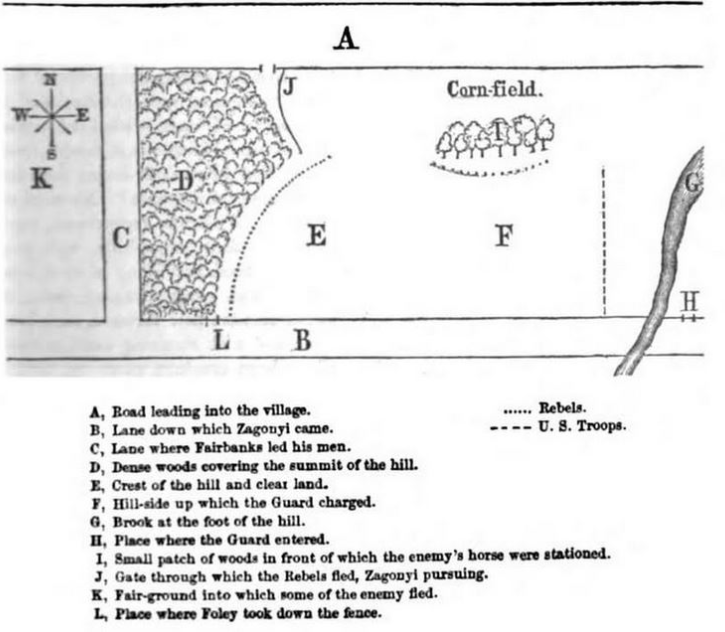
A map of the battle published in The Atlantic Monthly in 1862. William Dorsheimer's reporting on Frémont's campaign was published in The Atlantic Monthly in early 1862.

Writing of the ensuing engagement, Starr states that "The truth of what happened in Springfield on this October day is lost beyond recovery", and Miller notes that Zagonyi's account of the action was intentionally inaccurate to glorify his troops at the expense of the Prairie Scouts. Gerteis describes the sequence of the battle as Zagonyi's men, accompanied by Captain Patrick Naughton and the Prairie Scouts, destroying a fence to make a path for their charge while under Missouri State Guard fire, with the attack driving Frazier's cavalry into Springfield and Frazier's infantry into some woods. Gerteis then has Zagonyi's men pursuing Guardsmen through the streets of Springfield, with Zagonyi gathering his scattered men before dark, deciding that he did not have enough men to hold the city, and then withdrawing back north. Wolk describes the battle as opening with Company A of the Body-Guard (led by Lieutenant Walter Newhall) charging eastward down the lane and coming under fire from the Missouri State Guard infantry, followed by Company C of the Body-Guard (led by Captain James L. Foley), and then Naughton's company of the Prairie Scouts. These three companies exited the lane and then turned around to face the west, before making a saber charge against the Missouri State Guard line. In Wolk's narrative, the other two companies of the Prairie Scouts had been in the rear of the Union column and turned north, in effect making a flanking attack against the Missouri State Guard position. Captain Charles Fairbanks, the commander of one of the two companies, later claimed that an unknown officer of the Body-Guard had ordered this movement with the aim of blocking the Missouri State Guard retreat. Wolk has the Missouri State Guardsmen driven off, but Zagonyi then withdrawing his troops northward to rejoin Sigel's force as it was obvious Springfield could not be held. Miller's account of the battle has two companies charging with Zagonyi through a gap in the fence, while Foley's company had to tear down a portion of the fence to attack. Miller then has Foley repulsed in a charge, Zagonyi's column driving off Frazier's cavalry but then being repulsed by his infantry, and a third charge driving off the Guardsmen. Under Miller's account, the Guardsmen fled toward Neosho, with Zagonyi's men entering Springfield, but withdrawing north towards Bolivar at dark, having abandoned his wounded.

Zagonyi claimed after the battle that the Prairie Scouts had not participated in the charge, but the official report of the Prairie Scouts states that two companies of that unit fought under Fairbanks near the Missouri State Guard's rear and made three flanking attacks against Frazier's line. Miller states that evidence also points to Naughton's company fighting with Foley, and Foley reported that a portion of the Prairie Scouts fought with his command instead of Zagonyi's two companies because of a misunderstanding. Wolk connects these allegations to the diversion of the trailing two companies to the north, and notes that Zagonyi accused the men of cowardice. Zagonyi's report also claimed that he had raised a United States flag in Springfield, but Miller notes that there is evidence that suggests this is inaccurate.

== Aftermath ==
Zagonyi admitted to a loss of 15 killed, 27 wounded, and 10 missing in action. A postwar secondhand account written by Confederate officer William Preston Johnston claimed that Frazier had lost only two or three men. Miller notes the existence of a Union claim that the Missouri State Guard had lost at least 116 men. Zagonyi's official report claimed that at least 106 Missouri State Guardsmen were dead, with 27 captured and more wounded; the report also stated that 45 horses had been killed or incapacitated during the action, that the men's weapons had been "seriously damaged" by enemy fire, and that the Union troops' uniforms and spare clothes had been "so riddled with bullets as to be useless". Preservationist Frances E. Kennedy places Union losses at 85 and Frazier's loss at 133. John Bicknell, a biographer of Frémont, mentions a funeral which was held on October 28 for eighteen Union soldiers killed during the battle, while Wolk states that 17 Union soldiers were killed during the action.

The fight had accomplished very little, but it was celebrated in the Union press and known as "Zagonyi's death-attack". Wolk states that the idea of the battle as a "death attack" continues into the 21st century in some Hungarian histories, and describes the battle as "a wholly unnecessary affair fueled by Frémont's hubris". Wolk further suggests that the entire action may have been designed to be a media sensation which raised morale on the home front. George Boker wrote a poem about it, and Frémont compared the action to the Charge of the Light Brigade, which had taken place exactly seven years earlier. Wolk speculates that the battle may have been intentionally planned to occur on the anniversary of the famous charge. Most focus on the battle is aimed at the charge down the lane, rather than the more impactful charge up the hill. White escaped from his captors on October 26 and occupied Springfield with a small group of stragglers. Union troops occupied Springfield two days after the battle.

Zagonyi's battle at Springfield did not raise Frémont's standing with the federal government, and he was relieved of command in early November and replaced by Major General David Hunter. Hunter called off Frémont's offensive and withdrew from Springfield, allowing Price to reoccupy the city. About a week after taking command, Hunter was reassigned to Kansas and replaced by Major General Henry W. Halleck. A Union offensive in early 1862 drove Price out of Missouri, and the Battle of Pea Ridge in March 1862 secured Union control of Missouri. Frémont and Zagonyi were assigned east to what is now West Virginia, and fought in Jackson's Valley campaign. Zagonyi left active military service in late June 1862. The city of Springfield's Zagonyi Park is a 1931 monument commemorating the charge, although the accuracy of the text on the monument has been challenged.

== Sources ==
- Bicknell, John (2025). The Pathfinder and the President: John C. Frémont, Abraham Lincoln, and the Battle for Emancipation. Essex, Connecticut: Stackpole Books. ISBN 978-0-8117-7665-3.
- Brooksher, William Riley (2000) [1995]. Bloody Hill: The Civil War Battle of Wilson's Creek. Lincoln, Nebraska: Potomac Books. ISBN 978-1-57488-205-6.
- Gerteis, Louis S. (2012). The Civil War in Missouri. Columbia, Missouri: University of Missouri Press. ISBN 978-0-8262-1972-5.
- Kennedy, Frances H., ed. (1998). The Civil War Battlefield Guide (2nd ed.). Boston/New York: Houghton Mifflin. ISBN 978-0-395-74012-5.
- Miller, Robert E. (1982). "Zagonyi". Missouri Historical Review. 76 (2): 174–192.
- Parrish, William E. (2001) [1973]. A History of Missouri. Vol. III: 1860 to 1875. Columbia, Missouri: University of Missouri Press. ISBN 0-8262-1376-6.
- Starr, Stephen Z. (1985). The Union Cavalry in the Civil War. Vol. III: The War in the West, 1861–1865. Baton Rouge, Louisiana: Louisiana State University Press. ISBN 0-8071-1209-7.
- Wolk, Gregory (2025). John Frémont's 100 Days: Clashes and Convictions in Civil War Missouri. St. Louis, Missouri: Missouri Historical Society Press. ISBN 979-8-9855716-5-3.
- Zagonyi, Charles (1881). "Report of Maj. Charles Zagonyi, Frémont's Body-Guard". In Scott, Robert N. (ed.). The War of the Rebellion: A Compilation of the Official Records of the Union and Confederate Armies. 1. Vol. 3. Washington, D.C.: United States Government Printing Office. OCLC 262466842.
