= Herculaneum, Missouri =

- City
- Nickname: Herky
- Location of Herculaneum, Missouri
- Coordinates: 38°15′49″N 90°23′41″W
- Country: United States
- State: Missouri
- County: Jefferson
- Incorporated: July 27, 1819 (April 1972)

Government
  - Type: Mayor and Board of Aldermen
  - City Administrator: Jim Kasten

Area
  - Total: 4.19 sq mi (10.84 km^{2})
  - Land: 4.16 sq mi (10.77 km^{2})
  - Water: 0.031 sq mi (0.08 km^{2})
- Elevation: 440 ft (130 m)

Population (2020)
  - Total: 4,672
  - Density: 1,123.7/sq mi (433.85/km^{2})
- Time zone: UTC-6 (Central (CST))
  - Summer (DST): UTC-5 (CDT)
- ZIP code: 63048
- Area code: 636
- FIPS code: 29-31708
- GNIS feature ID: 2394358
- Website: cityofherculaneum.gov

Depiction in mural at Missouri State Capitol

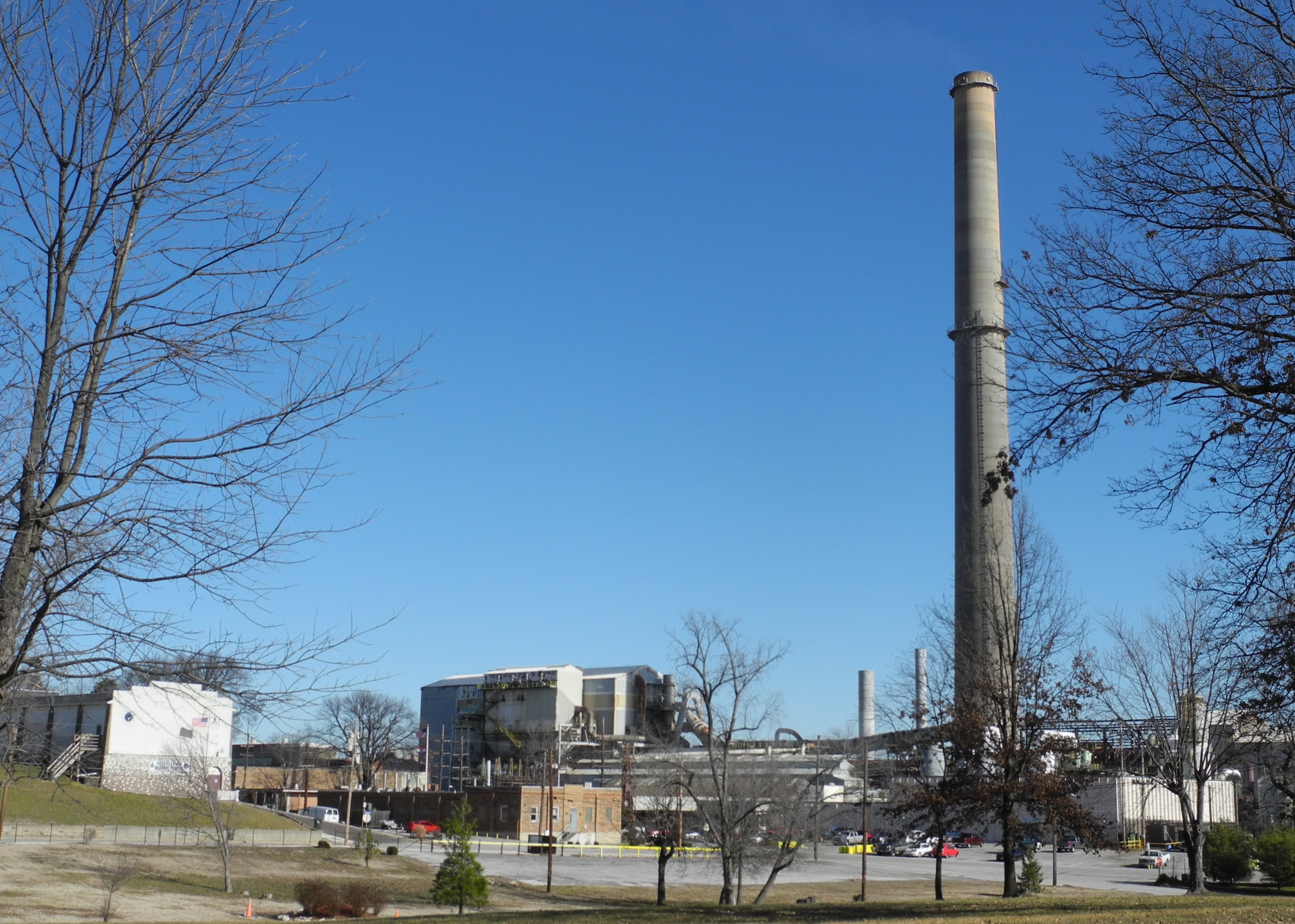
Doe Run Company lead smelter

Herculaneum is a city in Jefferson County, Missouri, and is a suburb of St. Louis. The population was 4,273 at the 2020 United States census. The City of Herculaneum was the first county seat of Jefferson County from January 1, 1819, to 1839. The city celebrated its bicentennial throughout 2008.

The city received the "Tree City USA" designation by the Arbor Day Foundation for 11 consecutive years, 2007 through 2017. The city is the honorary hometown of the 40th Airlift Squadron, "The Screaming Eagles," from Dyess Air Force Base in Texas.

== Geography ==
According to the United States Census Bureau, the city has a total area of 4.10 square miles (10.62 km^{2}), of which 4.06 square miles (10.52 km^{2}) is land and 0.04 square miles (0.10 km^{2}) is water.

== Origins ==
Herculaneum was laid out by Moses Austin and Samuel Hammond in 1808 as a shipping point on the Mississippi River closer to Austin's lead mines in Potosi than was Ste. Genevieve.

The town was named after the ancient Roman town of Herculaneum, destroyed by the eruption of Mount Vesuvius. Austin is said to have chosen the name because the limestone ledges overlooking the Mississippi River resembled a Roman amphitheatre.

Shot towers were constructed next to the bluffs to manufacture lead ammunition, and lead cannonballs from Herculaneum were used in the War of 1812. Lead smelting by the Doe Run Company is no longer operating and under a shutdown process. It was a major industry in Herculaneum until its closure due to inability to match increased EPA regulations due to environmental and health effects.

The name "Herculaneum" is a reference to the Ancient Roman city of Herculaneum which was the chief supplier of lead for the Roman Republic and Empire.

== History ==
In 1798, Moses Austin, a settler from Connecticut, obtained a Spanish land grant of one square league (approximately 3 square miles) of land after learning of the richness of the area's rich mineral deposits. After bringing in equipment and workmen from Virginia, he began mining and smelting lead despite frequent problems with the neighboring Osage tribe. In 1808, Austin and Samuel Hammond laid out a town at the mouth of Joachim Creek. The purpose of the new town was to serve as a shipping point for the lead smelted at mines in Jefferson and Washington Counties. It is believed the town was named by Austin, who called it Herculaneum because the limestone strata were so eroded that they resembled seats in the amphitheater of the ancient Roman city of Herculaneum buried by Mt. Vesuvius in 79 A.D.

The first post office in Jefferson County was at Herculaneum, established soon after the town was laid out, and it remained the only post office in the county for nearly thirty years.

By 1813, three shot towers had been constructed on the bluffs. These were designed for the production of shot balls by dropping molten lead through copper sieves. The balls were then caught in a water basin and taken to an adjoining building, to be turned through cylinders to round and smooth the pellets for use as projectiles in firearms.

On December 8, 1818, Jefferson County, along with seven other counties, was formed from parts of Saint Louis and Ste. Genevieve Counties by an Act of the Territory by the Missouri Territorial Legislature. In 1819, Herculaneum was named as the county seat.

At this time Herculaneum was described as a town having between thirty and forty homes, three stores, a post office, a jail, a court building, and a school. Herculaneum's fortunes declined when the county seat was relocated to Hillsboro in 1839 and when the St. Louis, Iron Mountain and Southern Railway bypassed the town in the early 1850s. The community experienced a revival starting in 1887 when the St. Joseph Lead Company chose Herculaneum as a lead smelting site, and the Mississippi River & Bonne Terre Railroad ran track into town.

In 1892, the first operation of the smelter began with the operation of calcine furnaces, two blast furnaces, a refinery, and a powerhouse for the generation of steam and electricity. The smelting operations are the largest in the United States, producing approximately 225,000 tons of refined lead annually. They are operated by the Doe Run Company, which bought the operations in 1981.

In 1970, acting on an incorporation petition from 1819, a committee for the incorporation of Herculaneum filed a petition with the Jefferson County Circuit Court, asking the court to order Herculaneum incorporated and to appoint commissioners to oversee an election of Board of Trustees. On September 15, 1971, the Jefferson County Circuit Court took under advisement the petition to reactivate the incorporation of Herculaneum. Attorneys presented evidence that Herculaneum was incorporated on July 27, 1819, two years before Missouri became a state. Attorneys also claimed that the boundaries of the town were well established by common knowledge. On January 7, 1972, the Jefferson County Circuit Court notified the Herculaneum incorporation committee that the 1819 incorporation was being reactivated and that Herculaneum would officially function as a city.

An election was held on April 4, 1972, for the purpose of electing a five-person board of trustees. On April 9, 1972, the trustees were sworn into office. Donald Stotler was unanimously elected to serve as the first chairman of the board of trustees. On September 5, 1972, the City of Herculaneum officially opened the doors to city offices located in the old Douglass School building at the end of Wedge Street. On April 3, 1973, the first board of aldermen and mayor were elected.

In 2013, Doe Run Company announced that it would cease operations of its smelter, citing rising regulatory costs. The December 31 closing of the smelter on the west bank of the Mississippi River, south of St. Louis, marks the end of an era in a region that has supplied most of the nation's lead since the 1700s.

Demolition of the Doe Run Company has taken place throughout 2018.

== Lead pollution ==
The city of Herculaneum has had a decades-long pollution of the town's soil and ground water with lead, which achieved national attention caused by the Doe Run plant, which operates a lead smelter in the area. According to 60 Minutes, Doe Run company trucks would carry hazardous lead-ore and slag in open bed trucks; this resulted in lead-dust accumulating on roads and streets throughout the city.

In August 2001, Herculaneum officials became concerned regarding residue and began investigating; leading to state officials testing the residual dust on the road and discovering that the lead concentration was 300,000 parts per million, 750 times exceeding the hazardous minimum. In a 2010, settlement with the EPA, Doe Run was fined $65 million and received a $7 million civil penalty. At the end of 2013, Doe Run shut down smelter operations in Herculaneum, although refining and other activities continue.

== Demographics ==
Historical population
Census	Pop.	Note	%±
1950	1,603		—
1960	1,767		10.2%
1970	2,439		38.0%
1980	2,293		−6.0%
1990	2,263		−1.3%
2000	2,805		24.0%
2010	3,468		23.6%
2020	4,672		34.7%
U.S. Decennial Census

=== 2020 census ===
As of the 2020 census, Herculaneum had a population of 4,672. The median age was 38.0 years. 25.2% of residents were under the age of 18 and 16.7% of residents were 65 years of age or older. For every 100 females there were 91.7 males, and for every 100 females age 18 and over there were 90.8 males age 18 and over.

99.8% of residents lived in urban areas, while 0.2% lived in rural areas.

There were 1,650 households in Herculaneum, of which 37.7% had children under the age of 18 living in them. Of all households, 56.0% were married-couple households, 15.1% were households with a male householder and no spouse or partner present, and 21.1% were households with a female householder and no spouse or partner present. About 22.2% of all households were made up of individuals and 10.8% had someone living alone who was 65 years of age or older.

There were 1,730 housing units, of which 4.6% were vacant. The homeowner vacancy rate was 0.9% and the rental vacancy rate was 8.6%.

Racial composition as of the 2020 census
Race	Number	Percent
White	4,224	90.4%
Black or African American	72	1.5%
American Indian and Alaska Native	17	0.4%
Asian	45	1.0%
Native Hawaiian and Other Pacific Islander	2	0.0%
Some other race	45	1.0%
Two or more races	267	5.7%
Hispanic or Latino (of any race)	96	2.1%

=== 2010 census ===
As of the census of 2010, there were 3,468 people, 1,309 households, and 927 families residing in the city. The population density was 854.2 inhabitants per square mile (329.8/km^{2}). There were 1,449 housing units at an average density of 356.9 per square mile (137.8/km^{2}). The racial makeup of the city was 95.4% White, 1.8% African American, 0.3% Native American, 1.1% Asian, 0.3% from other races, and 1.2% from two or more races. Hispanic or Latino of any race were 0.9% of the population.

There were 1,309 households, of which 35.8% had children under the age of 18 living with them, 57.3% were married couples living together, 8.3% had a female householder with no husband present, 5.2% had a male householder with no wife present, and 29.2% were non-families. 24.1% of all households were made up of individuals, and 12.9% had someone living alone who was 65 years of age or older. The average household size was 2.53 and the average family size was 3.00.

The median age in the city was 37.8 years. 23.9% of residents were under the age of 18; 6.7% were between the ages of 18 and 24; 29% were from 25 to 44; 24.4% were from 45 to 64; and 16.1% were 65 years of age or older. The gender makeup of the city was 49.0% male and 51.0% female.

=== 2000 census ===
As of the census of 2000, there were 2,805 people, 1,028 households, and 736 families residing in the city. The population density was 815.8 inhabitants per square mile (315.0/km^{2}). There were 1,078 housing units at an average density of 313.5 per square mile (121.0/km^{2}). The racial makeup of the city was 96.65% White, 2.60% African American, 0.18% Asian, 0.04% from other races, and 0.53% from two or more races. Hispanic or Latino of any race were 0.64% of the population.

There were 1,028 households, out of which 31.8% had children under the age of 18 living with them, 58.0% were married couples living together, 8.9% had a female householder with no husband present, and 28.4% were non-families. 25.1% of all households were made up of individuals, and 15.6% had someone living alone who was 65 years of age or older. The average household size was 2.52 and the average family size was 2.99.

In the city the population was spread out, with 22.6% under the age of 18, 7.2% from 18 to 24, 27.2% from 25 to 44, 21.1% from 45 to 64, and 21.8% who were 65 years of age or older. The median age was 40 years. For every 100 females, there were 88.0 males. For every 100 females age 18 and over, there were 84.1 males.

The median income for a household in the city was $40,365, and the median income for a family was $50,615. Males had a median income of $33,603 versus $25,581 for females. The per capita income for the city was $18,613. About 2.4% of families and 5.7% of the population were below the poverty line, including 3.0% of those under age 18 and 14.3% of those age 65 or over.

== City government ==
The City of Herculaneum is a fourth-class city governed by a six-person board of aldermen and a mayor. The day-to-day operations of the city are under the direction of a city administrator.

The current city hall is located at #1 Parkwood Court and includes the offices of the mayor, city administrator, city clerk, building department, public works supervisor, water department, municipal court and police department.

== Churches and religion ==
The City of Herculaneum is home to several churches, including Buren Chapel AME, United Methodist Church, Assembly of God Church, Journey Community Church, Heart of the Apostles Fellowship, and the Church of Jesus Christ of Latter-Day Saints.

The first Protestant service west of the Mississippi River took place in 1793 as a group of settlers stood on the riverbank and listened to John Clark, a Methodist minister, preach from a boat in the river. The sermon was delivered not on Missouri soil, but near Bates Rock at the mouth of the Joachim Creek as it flows into the Mississippi River. The Bates Rock location is in present-day Herculaneum.

Herculaneum also had a Baptist church from its founding in 1908 until its building's destruction by fire in 1991. During that time, the church hosted classes for the local school when in burned in 1947 and the school allowed the church to hold temporary services in their building in 1991. A new building was built in Pevely and the church is now known as First Baptist Church of Herculaneum-Pevely.

== Cemeteries ==
Cemeteries located in Herculaneum include the Herculaneum City Cemetery (established December 3, 1915) on North Scenic Drive, Assumption Catholic Cemetery (established 1916) on Scenic Drive, Rankin Memorial Cemetery (established June 29, 1881) on Short Street, Daniel Dunklin family gravesite (established 1866) at the end of Dunklin Drive, and three smaller family cemeteries.

== Education ==
Dunklin R-V School District (Herculaneum, Pevely and Horine) is based in Herculaneum, with administrative offices located at 400 Joachim Avenue. Herculaneum High School and the Senn-Thomas Middle School (grades 6-8) are both located in the city of Herculaneum. The Pevely Elementary School (grades K-5) is located in Pevely, Missouri. The original Herculaneum Public School (built in 1912) housed all grades until a Christmas Day fire in 1947. Following renovation, the building reopened as the Herculaneum High School in 1949 and housed the high school students until demolition during the summer of 2010.

The current high school was built on the same location as the 1949 building and opened in August 2011. One of the most prominent features of the Herculaneum High School Campus is the stone bleachers at the football and track field. The bleachers were a Works Progress Administration (WPA) project that began in 1935 and were completed in 1936.

The Roy E. Taylor Elementary building, also located in Herculaneum, is owned by the district and is currently used by the Early Childhood Learning Center. Herculaneum had its own Douglass Elementary School (closed in 1957) that was operated by the public school system prior to integration in the mid 1950s. A school building was also in operation from 1937 to 1966 as part of the Herculaneum Assumption Catholic Church.

Herculaneum previously had a public library, the Herculaneum Public Library, which is now closed and the building no longer exists.

== Fire department ==
The Herculaneum Volunteer Fire Department was organized in 1951 and celebrated its 66th anniversary in 2017. The fire department contracts with the City of Herculaneum to provide fire protection to most of the city. The fire department operates from one fire station, and has 16 volunteer and one paid firefighter. The City of Herculaneum has an ISO rating of 4. The fire department is dispatched by the Jefferson County 9-1-1 Dispatch Center.

The fire department provides fire, rescue, and EMS service to town residents. Its fleet includes a 2012 Rosenbauer pumper/rescue, a 2009 Rosenbauer rescue/brush apparatus, a 1988 American Eagle pumper, two water rescue boats and a 2007 Gator utility vehicle. The fire department supports the Joachim-Plattin Ambulance District on all calls of a life-threatening nature.

== Police department ==
The City of Herculaneum provides police protection through a city police department. The Herculaneum Police Department Office is located at Herculaneum City Hall in the basement. The police department is dispatched through Jefferson County 911 Dispatch. The current Chief of Police is Sharia Kyle.

== Parks ==
Kade's Playground, a volcano-themed, all-inclusive playground- is located in the Herculaneum City Park. The playground opened in 2015. The adjacent Bay of Naples Splash Zone opened in the summer of 2019.

Herculaneum City Park, located on South Joachim Avenue, is the largest park in Herculaneum. It is home to three baseball fields, the Joachim Loop Trail and All Bark Village Dog Park. The universally accessible playground, Kade's Playground, officially opened on November 1, 2015. The annual "Movies in the Park" series are shown on an outdoor cinema screen here. The park is host to the annual Jeffco Fire Engine Rally held annually in September. Other annual events held here include the city Easter egg hunts, Evening with Santa, Things That Go, the City Festival and Fourth of July Celebration, Veterans Day Program, and other events sponsored by various organizations.

Bates Memorial Park is located on each side of the Joachim Creek on South Joachim Avenue. The park, named in honor of former Municipal Judge Nicholas Bates, includes a boat ramp, a pavilion, fishing areas, and a portion of the Joachim Loop Trail. The park contains large open spaces on each side of the creek for the establishment of wetlands.

Dunklin-Fletcher Memorial Park is located on North Main Street and overlooks the Mississippi River. It is dedicated in honor of Missouri Governors Daniel Dunklin (who is buried in Herculaneum) and Thomas C. Fletcher (who was born in Herculaneum). The park offers a scenic view of the river and contains benches and picnic tables.

Shot Tower Memorial Park is located at the intersection of Dunklin Drive and North Main Street. It was officially dedicated in 2003 in honor of the three shot towers located in Herculaneum during the early 1800s. The park sidewalks are lined with memorial bricks celebrating the history and townspeople of Herculaneum. Benches and parking are available. The park also has a bronze plaque attached to a large boulder that commemorates the original shot tower in Herculaneum, known as the Maclot Shot Tower. This was the first shot tower located west of Pittsburgh, and provided lead shot for the Battle of New Orleans during the War of 1812.

Governor Daniel Dunklin State Park is located at the end of Dunklin Drive, and overlooks the Mississippi River. It includes the graves of Governor Dunklin and his family members. The park was established in 1965 and is under the supervision of the Missouri Department of Natural Resources. This is the smallest park in the Missouri state park system. It has been designated a state historic site by the Department of Natural Resources. The gravesite underwent extensive improvements in 2011–12, including improvements to accessibility, ADA accessibility, a new parking area and numerous plantings of trees and vegetation.

== Attractions ==
Herculaneum is home to the Joachim Golf Course, located at 959 Scenic Drive. It was built in 1934 by the St. Joe Minerals. The course is now owned by the Doe Run Company and is leased to the Joachim Golf Club. It is a regulation nine-hole golf course with four sets of tee boxes to accommodate golfers of all skills. The course is noted for having some very difficult par 3 holes. It contains 11–20 sand bunkers, one lake and one small pond that comes into play on three holes. The fairways grass type is Zoysia grass and the greens grass is bent grass.

Missouri Governor Daniel Dunklin's gravesite is located at the end of Dunklin Drive, overlooking the Mississippi River. Dunklin served as the 5th Governor of Missouri, from November 19, 1832, to September 30, 1836. Other family members buried here include Emily (the Governor's wife), James F. Dunklin (his great grandson), James L. Dunklin (his son), Emily McIvan (his daughter) and Daniel Dunklin (his grandson). The gravesite is the smallest state park in the Missouri State Park system and is designated as a State Historic Site under the Department of Natural Resources.

Herculaneum is bordered on the east by the Mississippi River. The river can be viewed from the Daniel Dunklin Grave Site on Dunklin Drive and the Dunklin-Fletcher Memorial Park on Main Street. Access to the river is by way of Ferry Road off of North Main Street.

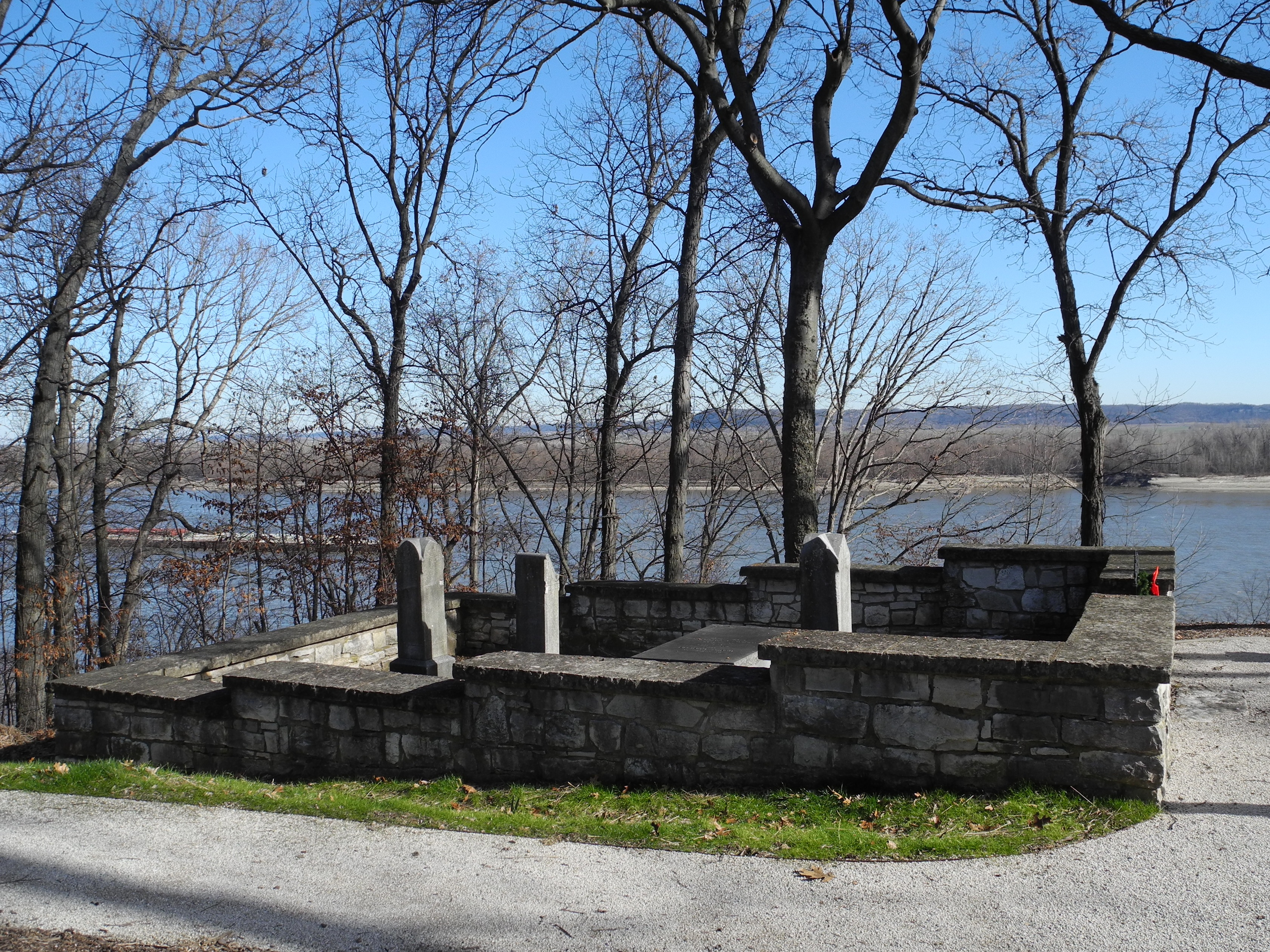
Gov. Daniel Dunklin's Grave State Historic Site

== Notable people ==
- Rick Burchett (born 1952) - comic book artist known for his work on such characters as Batman and Superman
- Daniel Dunklin (died 1844) - the 5th Governor of Missouri; died in Herculaneum and was buried in the family plot there
- Thomas Clement Fletcher (born 1827) - the 18th Governor of Missouri; born in Herculaneum
- Campbell Morfit (born 1820) - chemist; born in Herculaneum
- Tony Stevens (1948-2011), ne Anthony Pusateri - choreographer, dancer and director; instrumental in developing the story of A Chorus Line
