= Albert Galliton Harrison =

American politician

Albert G. Harrison
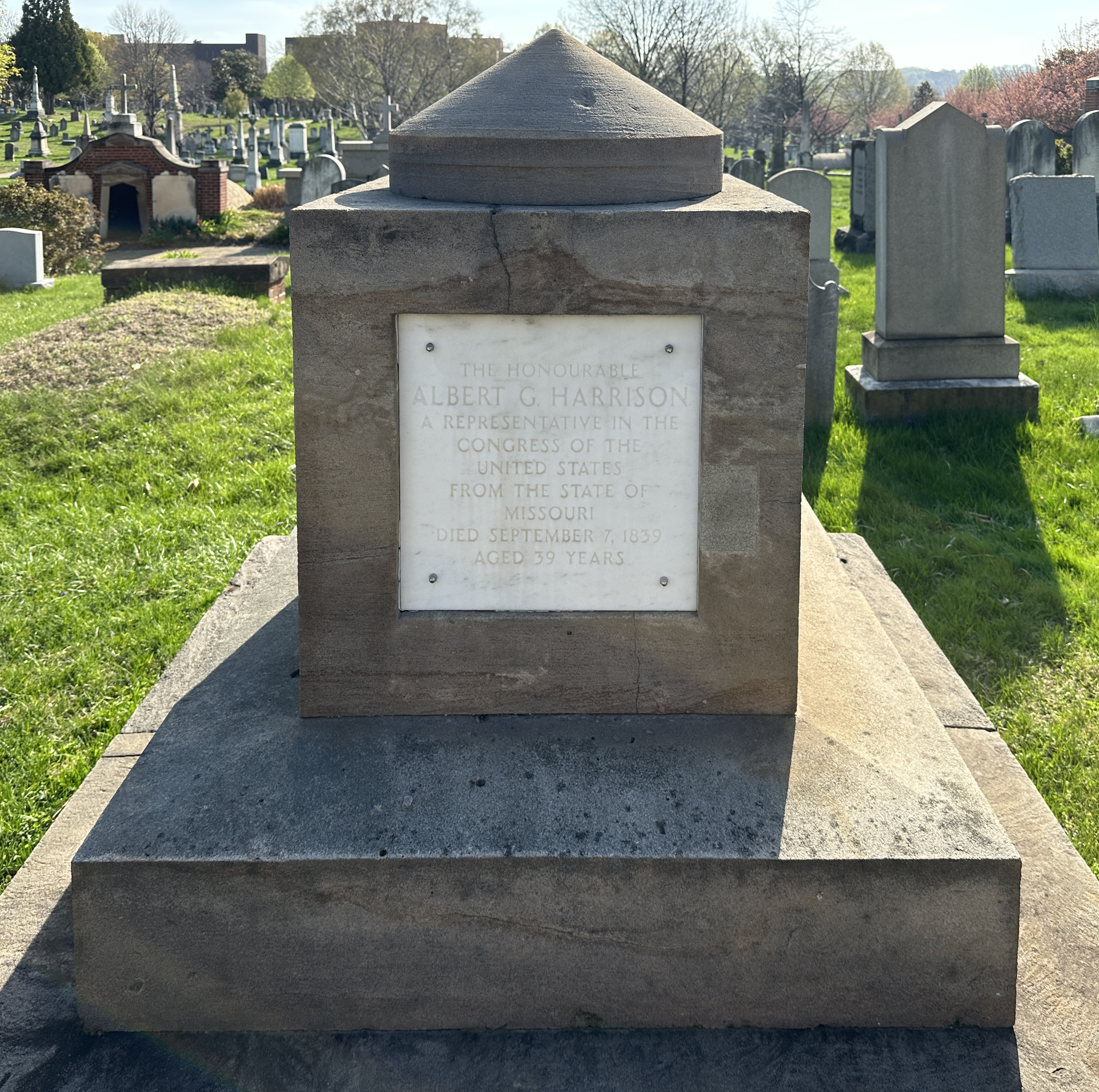
- Harrison's cenotaph at Congressional Cemetery

Member of the U.S. House of Representatives from Missouri's at-large district
- In office March 4, 1835 – September 7, 1839
- Preceded by: John Bull
- Succeeded by: John Jameson

Personal details
- Born: June 26, 1800 Mt. Sterling, Kentucky, U.S.
- Died: September 7, 1839 (aged 39) Fulton, Missouri, U.S.
- Resting place: Congressional Cemetery
- Party: Jacksonian democracy Democratic Party
- Education: Transylvania University

Albert Galliton Harrison (June 26, 1800 – September 7, 1839) was a three-term United States representative from Missouri and a slaveholder. From 1835 to 1839, he served two terms in Congress.

== Biography ==
Born in Mount Sterling, Kentucky, Harrison graduated from Transylvania University, Lexington, Kentucky, in 1820. He was then admitted to the bar and began his law practice in Mount Sterling. Seven years later, he moved to Fulton, Missouri.

Harrison served as member of the Board of Visitors to the United States Military Academy at West Point in 1828, and from 1829 to 1835 was a member of the commission to settle land titles growing out of Spanish grants.

=== Congress ===
In 1832, he was elected as a Jacksonian Democratic Representative to the Twenty-fourth Congress (March 4, 1835 – March 3, 1837). Harrison was re-elected as a Democratic Representative to the Twenty-fifth and Twenty-sixth Congresses (March 4, 1837 – September 7, 1839).

=== Death ===
Albert G. Harrison died six months into his third term in Fulton, Missouri at the age of 39 in 1839. His remains were interred in the Congressional Cemetery, Washington, D.C..

== Tributes ==
Harrison County, Missouri is named for him, as is the town of Harrisonville in Cass County, Missouri.

== See also ==
- List of members of the United States Congress who died in office (1790–1899)

U.S. House of Representatives
| Preceded by John Bull | Member of the U.S. House of Representatives from Missouri's at-large congressional district March 4, 1835 - September 7, 1839 | Succeeded by John Jameson |
