= Tony Stevens (choreographer) =

American dancer and choreographer

Tony Stevens (May 2, 1948 – July 12, 2011), born Anthony Pusateri, was an American choreographer, dancer, and director who worked with, danced with, and directed many of Broadway and Hollywood's theatre-centric actors and actresses, including Chita Rivera, Martin Short, Robert Redford, and Gene Kelly.

== Early life and performance career ==
Stevens was born in Herculaneum, Missouri to a factory worker father and a mother who owned and operated a small town general store. He debuted on Broadway in 1969, dancing in The Fig Leaves Are Falling (book and lyrics by Allan Sherman and music by Albert Hague). This was followed by roles in the 1970s productions of Billy, Jimmy, The Boy Friend, On the Town, Seesaw, and Irene, in addition to the 1973 benefit concert Sondheim: A Musical Tribute. Stevens also went on to perform with Chita Rivera and Christopher Chadman in Rivera's acclaimed nightclub act Chita Plus Two, which he also choreographed.

== Choreography and A Chorus Line ==
As his career as a Broadway gypsy took off, Stevens transitioned into a choreographer, assisting Peter Gennaro on Irene and co-choreographing the short-lived rock musical Rockabye Hamlet with Gower Champion. In 1975, Stevens had the honor of assisting Bob Fosse on the musical Chicago, which starred Gwen Verdon and Chita Rivera, who would become a lifelong friend and frequent collaborator with Stevens. Additional choreography credits include the short-lived Broadway musical Rachael Lily Rosenbloom (And Don't You Ever Forget It) and the Frank Loesser revue Perfectly Frank on Broadway in 1980.

Perhaps Stevens' greatest contribution to musical theatre history, however, was his decision to organize a series of tape sessions among Broadway dancers with Michon Peacock, which would eventually become the internationally acclaimed musical A Chorus Line. Originally conceived as a way to create a resident company of dancers who would create their own productions, Stevens and Peacock initially arranged the first tape session, inviting a group of seasoned Broadway dancers and Broadway director/choreographer Michael Bennett to "talk about life and what it means to be a dancer." As these initial talks developed into A Chorus Line, many of Stevens' stories and anecdotes made their way into the show's script. Stevens participated in the first workshop of the show at the Public Theater, where he played the role of Larry, before ultimately leaving the show to work on Chicago.

== Hollywood ==
Stevens' choreography credits soon expanded to include film and TV as well. In 1974, Stevens choreographed the dance sequences in The Great Gatsby with Robert Redford and Mia Farrow; he then went on to choreograph such films as The Best Little Whorehouse in Texas with Burt Reynolds and Dolly Parton, and Johnny Dangerously with Michael Keaton, and She's Having a Baby with Kevin Bacon. Some television credits include specials for Mary Tyler Moore, Cheryl Ladd, Disneyland's 30th Anniversary, and the People's Choice Awards. He also performed in the film Tommy and the 1971 TV special of Dames at Sea starring Ann-Margret and Ann Miller.

== Dr. Pepper TV commercials ==
But Stevens' high energy and infectious choreography was most widely seen, in the hugely popular "Be A Pepper" series of ubiquitous Dr. Pepper television commercials, featuring actor David Naughton, which regularly aired in the late 1970s through the early 1980s.

== Modern Broadway ==
Always in demand, Stevens worked steadily on Broadway as trends and tastes changed. Off-Broadway he choreographed Zombie Prom, The Body Shop, and directed and choreographed Sheba. He also did the national tours of Dreamgirls in 1997 and 1998, and the 20th Anniversary Tour of Jesus Christ Superstar. Other cutting edge work included The Complete Works of William Shakespeare, the recreation of Bob Fosse's original choreography for Chita Rivera: The Dancer's Life on Broadway, staging numbers for Martin Short and Nathan Lane on Late Night with David Letterman, and was currently developing the new musical La Familglia.

== Death ==
Stevens died in 2011 after battling Hodgkin's lymphoma. His life was commemorated on November 8, 2011 with the tribute performance In Celebration of Tony Stevens at the New York Society for Ethical Culture, which featured performances by Chita Rivera, Jack Lee, Sam Harris, Debbie Gravitte, Michon Peacock, Laura Kenyon, Harvey Evans, Robert Cuccioli, Nathan Sampson, Andy Bew, Carol Schuberg, Dante Puleio, and Gerry McIntyre. A documentary about Stevens' life and career, entitled With No Regrets: A Dancin' Man's Journey, debuted at the 2013 Dances with Films Festival in Hollywood, CA. Created by filmmakers George Fairfield and Crystal Chapman, the documentary features extensive interviews with Stevens and many of his colleagues, including Chita Rivera, Kelly Bishop, and Jerry Mitchell.
