= John Bull (Missouri politician) =

American politician

The Reverend John Bull

Member of the U.S. House of Representatives from Missouri's at-large district
- In office March 4, 1833 – March 3, 1835
- Preceded by: Seat created
- Succeeded by: Albert Galliton Harrison

Personal details
- Born: 1803 Virginia
- Died: February 1863 (aged 59–60) near Rothville, Missouri
- Resting place: Hutcheson Cemetery
- Party: National Republican
- Occupation: Methodist minister; physician

John Bull (1803 – February 1863) was an American clergyman and medical doctor who represented Missouri in the U.S. Congress between 1833 and 1835.

== Life ==
He was born in Virginia, and studied medicine in Baltimore, Maryland, moved to Howard County, Missouri, and settled near Glasgow, Missouri. He engaged in the practice of medicine. He owned slaves. He studied theology, was ordained to the ministry and became a Methodist minister in Glasgow, Missouri. He was an unsuccessful candidate in the 1832 Missouri gubernatorial election and a presidential elector on the Jackson-Calhoun ticket in 1828.

John Bull was elected as an Anti-Jacksonian candidate to the Twenty-third Congress (March 4, 1833 – March 3, 1835); resumed his ministerial duties and also the practice of medicine; died near Rothville, Missouri, Chariton County, Missouri, in February 1863; interment in Hutcheson Cemetery, a family burial ground, near Rothville.

Party political offices
| Vacant Title last held by William Carr | National Republican nominee for Governor of Missouri; 1832 | Succeeded by None |
U.S. House of Representatives
| Preceded by (none) | Member of the U.S. House of Representatives from Missouri's at-large congressional district 1833-1835 | Succeeded by Albert Galliton Harrison |
