= Seini =

- Town
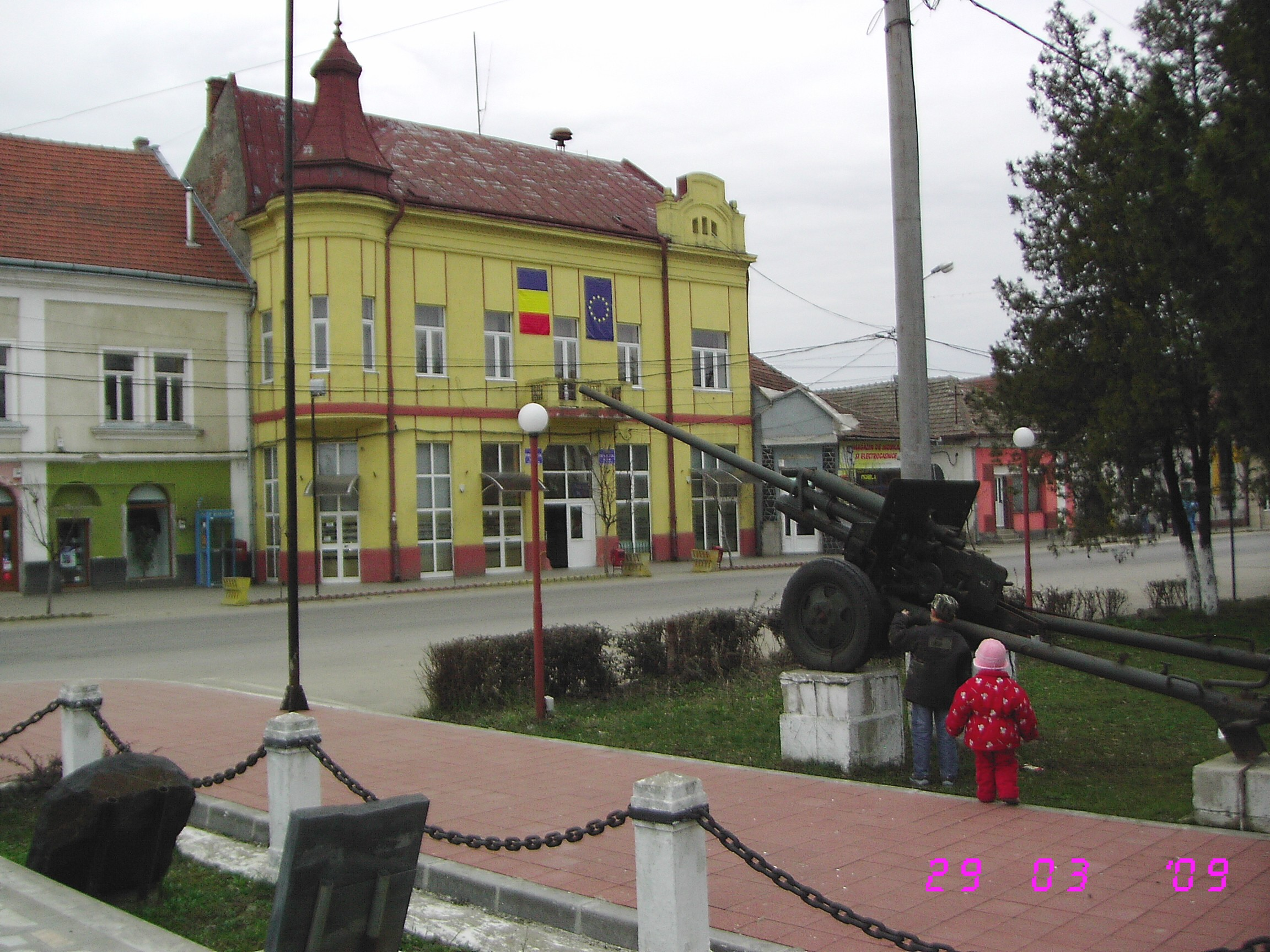
- Seini Town Hall

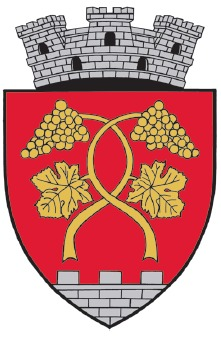
- Coat of arms

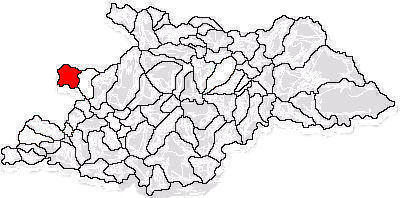
- Location in Maramureș County

- Location in Romania
- Coordinates: 47°44′52″N 23°17′7″E
- Country: Romania
- County: Maramureș

Government
  - Mayor (2024–2028): Gabriela Florica Tulbure (PSD)
- Area: 58.91 km^{2} (22.75 sq mi)
- Elevation: 140 m (460 ft)
- Population (2021-12-01): 8,198
  - Density: 139.2/km^{2} (360.4/sq mi)
- Time zone: UTC+02:00 (EET)
  - Summer (DST): UTC+03:00 (EEST)
- Postal code: 435400
- Area code: (+40) 02 62
- Vehicle reg.: MM
- Website: www.seini.ro

Seini (German: Leuchtenburg; Hungarian: Szinérváralja) is a town in Maramureș County, Romania. It administers two villages, Săbișa (Kissebespatak) and Viile Apei (Apahegy). It officially became a town in 1989, as a result of the Romanian rural systematization program.

== Geography ==
The town is located in the western part of Maramureș County, 27 km (17 mi) from the county seat, Baia Mare, on the border with Satu Mare County. It belongs to the Baia Mare metropolitan area.

Seini is crossed by national road DN1C (part of European route E58), which runs from Cluj-Napoca north towards Baia Mare and the border crossing at Halmeu, where it connects with the Ukrainian highway M26. The town has two train stations (Seini and Săbișa), both serving the CFR Main Line 400, which connects Brașov with Baia Mare and Satu Mare.

== Demographics ==
At the 2021 census, Seini had a population of 8,198, of which 77% were Romanians, 12.2% Hungarians, and 2.7% Roma.

Historical population
Year	Pop.	±%
1880	4,157	—
1900	5,212	+25.4%
1910	6,180	+18.6%
1930	6,477	+4.8%
1956	7,017	+8.3%
1977	9,055	+29.0%
1992	9,192	+1.5%
2002	9,439	+2.7%
2011	8,770	−7.1%
2021	8,198	−6.5%
Source: Census data

== Natives ==
- Béla Bay (1907–1999), Hungarian épée and foil fencer
- Alex Goldfarb (born 1947), Israeli politician
- János Sylvester (1504–1552), Hungarian figure of the Reformation, poet, and grammarian
- Charles Zagonyi (1822–1870), former Hungarian military officer who served in the American Civil War
