= Rancho Napa =

Mexican land grant in California

Coordinates: 38.360°N 122.330°W

Rancho Napa was a 22,718-acre (91.94 km^{2}) Mexican land grant in present-day Napa County, California given in 1838 by Governor Juan Alvarado to Salvador Vallejo. The grant extends along the Napa Valley, north of present-day Napa.

== History ==
Jose Manuel Salvador Vallejo (1813 - 1876) was the younger brother of General Mariano Guadalupe Vallejo. He was Captain of militia at Sonoma and married Maria de la Cruz Carrillo. In 1839 Governor Alvarado granted to Salvador Vallejo an additional grant known as Salvador's Ranch.

Unlike most Mexican land grants in California that remained intact at the end of the Mexican era, Rancho Napa was subdivided. Salvador Vallejo subdivided and sold much of the land in 1847 (during the Mexican-American War and before the transfer of California to the United States), retaining 3,179 acres (12.9 km^{2}) for himself. There were claims filed with the Public Land Commission in 1853 for 26 tracts (Land Cases 66 ND, 67 ND, 71 ND, 76 ND, 78 ND, 79 ND, 109 ND, 110 ND, 111 ND, 112 ND, 114 ND, 116 ND, 117 ND, 118 ND, 120 ND, 122 ND, 123 ND, 139 ND, 141 ND, 146 ND, 149 ND, 168 ND, 169 ND, 225 ND, 261 ND, 313 ND, and 393 ND) of Rancho Napa and 4 tracts (Land Cases 212 ND, 241 ND, and 249 ND) of Salvador's Rancho.

In 1863 Salvador Vallejo was a Major in the Union Army, and after the Civil War, he resigned and returned to his ranch in Napa in 1865, and died in 1876.

== See also ==
- Ranchos of Napa County, California
- Ranchos of California
- List of Ranchos of California
