= 1832 United Kingdom general election in Wales =

First Welsh election to the Reformed House of Commons

- 8 December 1832 – 8 January 1833

32 of the 658 seats to the House of Commons
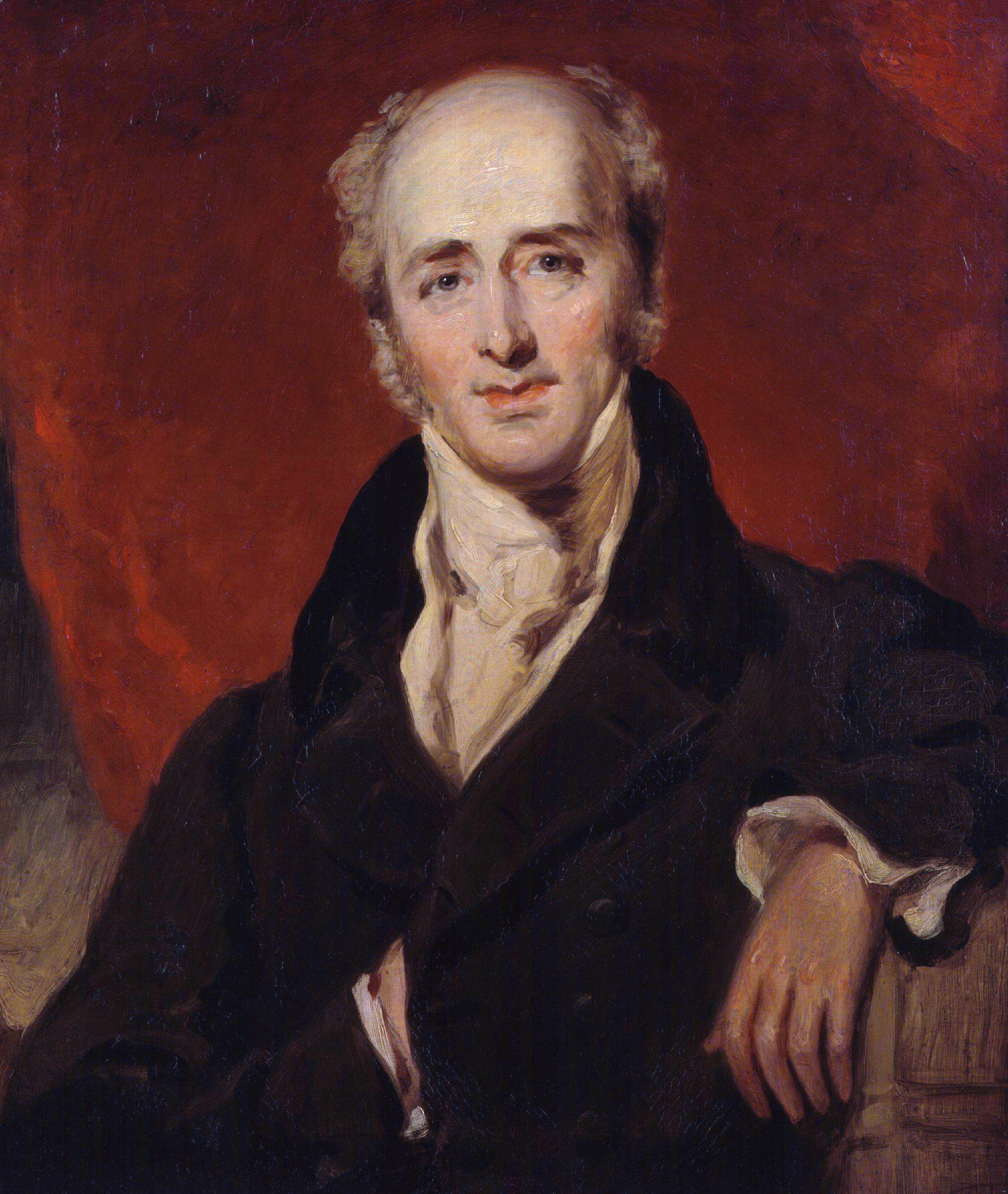

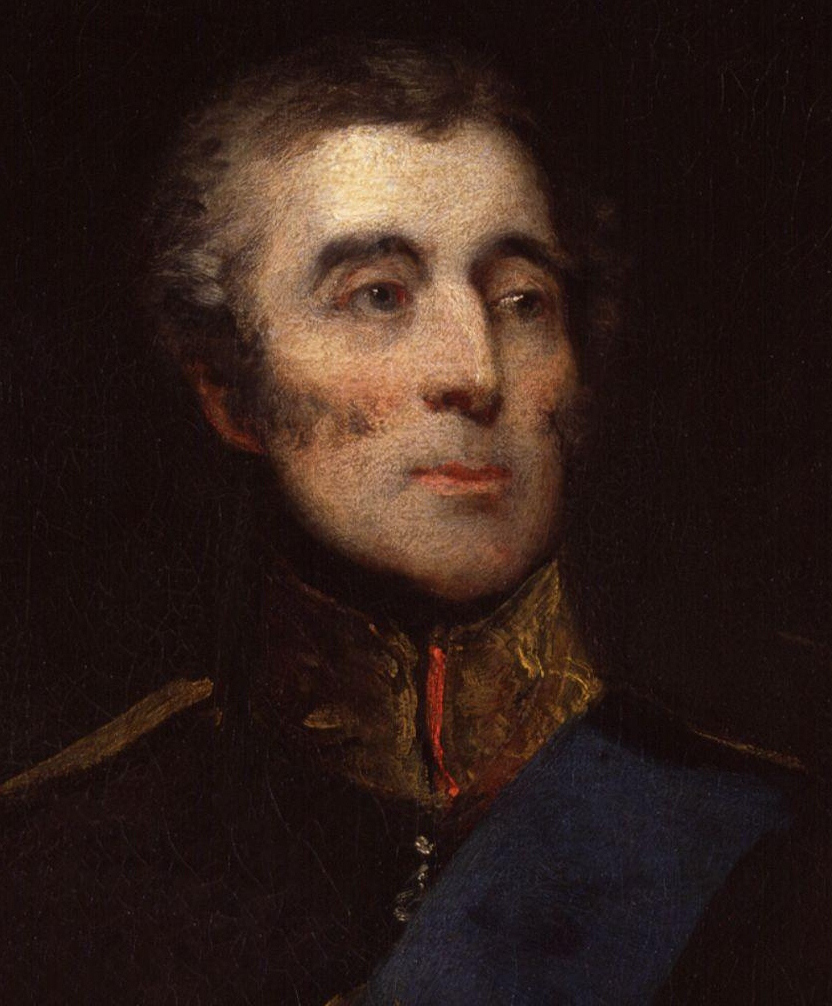
	First party	Second party
Leader	Earl Grey	Duke of Wellington
Party	Whig	Tory
Leader since	22 November 1830	22 January 1828
Leader's seat	House of Lords	House of Lords
Last election	14	13
Seats won	18	14
Seat change	▲4	▲1
Popular vote	6,348	7,466
Percentage	46.0%	54.0%
- Results by constituency

The 1832 United Kingdom general election in Wales was the first election held under the Reform Act 1832 and the Parliamentary Boundaries Act 1832. Wales saw its numbers of Members increased from 27 to 32, which includes Monmouthshire, which at the time was sometimes considered part of England. The Whigs, under the leadership of the Earl Grey won 18 seats (12 uncontested), against 14 (11 uncontested) for the Duke of Wellington's Tories.

== Results ==
Party	Seats	Seats change	Votes	%
Whig	14	▲4	6,348	46.0
Tory	13	▲1	7,466	54.0
Total	32	▲5	13,814	100

Popular vote
Tories	54.05%
Whigs	45.95%

Parliamentary seats
Whigs	56.25%
Tories	43.75%

== See also ==
- Modern history of Wales
