= Charles Zagonyi =

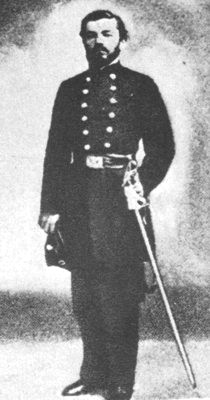
- Charles Zagonyi
- Born: 19 October 1822; Szinyérváralja, Kingdom of Hungary
- Died: around 1870 unknown
- Burial place: unknown
- Military career
- Allegiance: Kingdom of Hungary; United States
- Branch: Hungarian Army; Union Army
- Service years: 1847–1848 (Hungary); 1861–1862 (U.S.)
- Rank: 1st Lieutenant (Hungary); Colonel
- Conflicts: American Civil War: First Battle of Springfield; Battle of Cross Keys

Károly Zágonyi (19 October 1822 in Szinyérváralja, Hungary – around 1870), known in the U.S. as Charles Zagonyi, was a former Hungarian military officer who served in the American Civil War as an aide to Union general John C. Frémont and commander of his bodyguard at the rank of major, effective 19 September 1861.

== Hungarian Revolution ==
Charles Zagonyi served originally as a first lieutenant in the Hungarian Revolutionary Army during the 1848–1849 revolt. General Josef Bem assigned him to lead a picked company of cavalry. In such capacity he saved Bem's life, was captured, and imprisoned for two years by the Austrians.

== American Civil War ==
On July 2, 1851 Zagonyi arrived in the United States. He worked in New York and Philadelphia as a house painter. He served as a riding master in a Boston school operated by a fellow Hungarian émigré. Here he met and married a German-American lady by the name of Amanda Schweiger.

At the outbreak of the Civil War, Zagonyi offered his services to New York, but was rejected. He was invited to Missouri by Alexander Asboth where he was introduced to General John C. Frémont. Frémont assigned him to create and command his personal bodyguard. Zagonyi's force was modeled on the well disciplined Hungarian Hussars. Zagonyi "personally selected the matched bay mounts" and designed the dark blue uniforms and hats of Hussar style. The men carried themselves proudly. They were equipped with German cavalry sabers and revolvers.

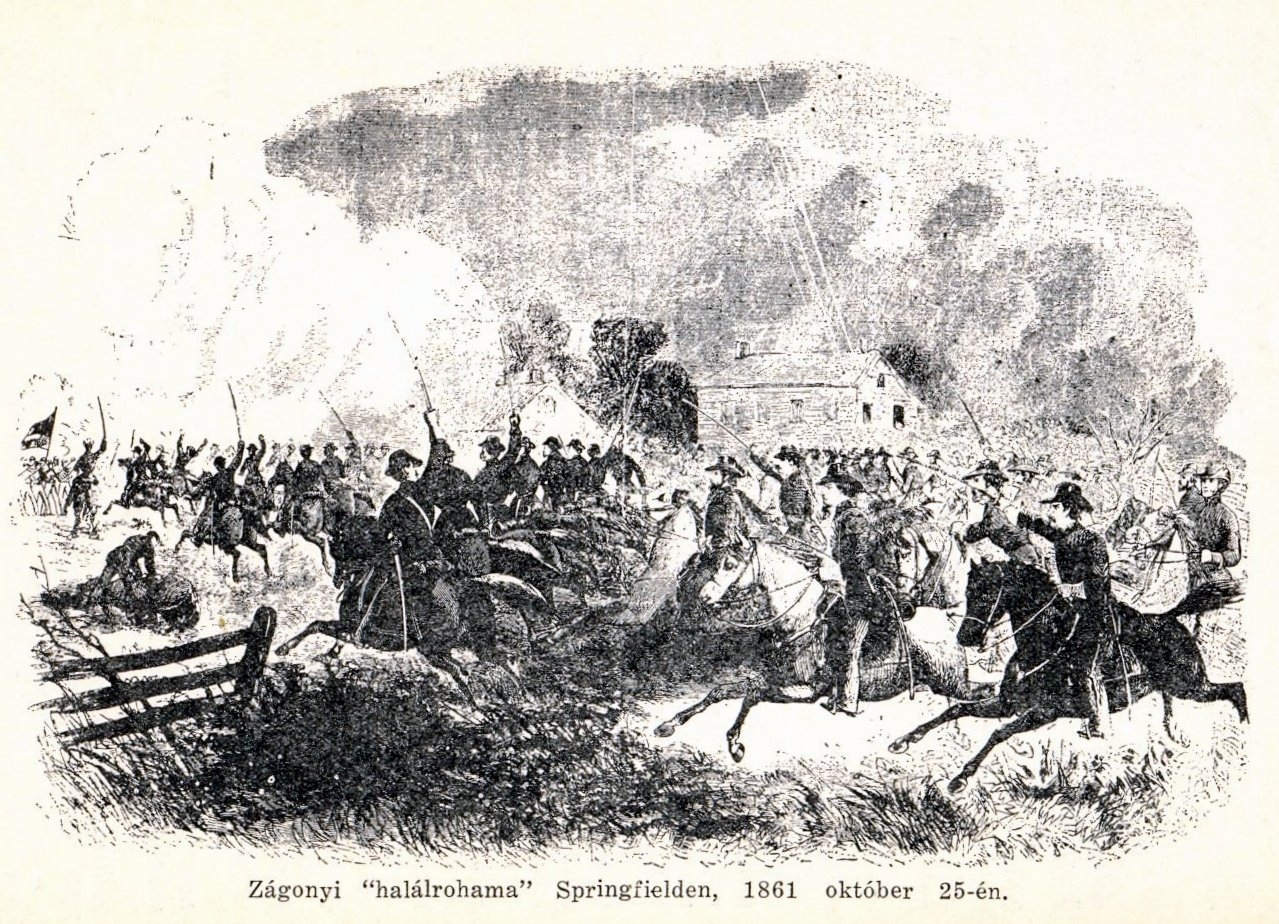
First Battle of Springfield or Zagonyi's Charge on October 25, 1861

On October 25, 1861, during the First Battle of Springfield, Zagonyi with 300 mounted men rashly charged into Springfield, Missouri, routing the Confederates. The charges proved costly in terms of casualties and the major lacked the forces to hold the city of the Union after dark. He withdrew, abandoning the city and his wounded to the secessionist forces. Zagonyi's charge would become famous, but his refusal to give credit to other attached forces alienated many fellow officers. Frémont's army would regain control of the town on October 27, and it would remain under Union control for the rest of the war.

Zagonyi was sidelined after Frémont was removed from command. Frémont's bodyguard was mustered out of service in November 1861 despite being three year volunteers.

Frémont was restored to command in the Shenandoah Valley as commander of the Mountain District encompassing West Virginia, eastern Kentucky, and East Tennessee. Fremont again utilized Zagonyi as his cavalry commander, promoting him to colonel. Stonewall Jackson and his Confederates outmaneuvered and outfought Frémont's much larger force during the Valley Campaign. Following this final Frémont debacle, General John Pope was assigned to command all of the U.S. troops in northern Virginia. Frémont resigned rather than serve under Pope, and Zagonyi withdrew from service.

Zagonyi attended the McKinstry attended the 1864 Radical Democratic National Convention.

== Postwar ==
Zagonyi returned to New York after the war and served as temporary president of the Hungarian Society there. In 1867 he attempted to return to Hungary, but lacked the money for the trip. A disputed 1871 article indicates he was the owner of a tobacco shop in Pest, Hungary. Another says he was never heard from again after 1867.

Zagonyi Park in Springfield, Missouri, is named for Zagonyi and his famous charge there. There is a marker in the park that describes the charge.
