= 3rd Illinois Cavalry Regiment =

Military unit in the Union Army

- Illinois flag
- Active: August 27, 1861, to October 18, 1865
- Country: United States
- Allegiance: Union
- Branch: Cavalry
- Engagements: Battle of Pea Ridge; Battle of Port Gibson; Battle of Champion Hill; Siege of Vicksburg; Battle of Nashville

The 3rd Illinois Cavalry Regiment was a cavalry regiment that served in the Union Army during the American Civil War. It fought at such battles as Pea Ridge, Sherman's Yazoo campaign, the battle of Port Gibson, and the siege of Vicksburg.

== Service ==
Organized at Camp Butler, Ill., and mustered in August 27, 1861. Moved to St. Louis, Mo., September 25, thence to Jefferson City, Mo., and to Warsaw, Mo., October 1–11. Attached to Dept. of the Missouri to January, 1862. 3rd Brigade, Army of Southwest Missouri, to February, 1862. 2nd Brigade, 4th Division, Army of Southwest Missouri, to May, 1862. 2nd Division, Army of Southwest Missouri, to July, 1862. District of Eastern Arkansas, Dept. of Missouri, to December, 1862. 3rd Brigade, Cavalry Division, District of Eastern Arkansas, December, 1862. Unattached, Sherman's Yazoo Expedition, to January, 1863 (Cos. "A", "E", "G", "K", "L" and "M"). Unattached, 13th Army Corps, Army of the Tennessee, Headquarters of Gen. McClernand and Gen. Osterhaus, to August, 1863. (5 Cos., "B", "C", "F", "H" and "I," 2nd Brigade, 1st Cavalry Division, 16th Army Corps, March to June, 1863. 1st Brigade, 1st Division Cavalry, 16th Army Corps, to August, 1863, 2nd Brigade, 1st Cavalry Division, 16th Army Corps, to January, 1864.) (Co. "D" at Headquarters 15th Army Corps to July, 1863, then with Arkansas Expedition to December, 1863.) Other Companies attached to Cavalry Brigade, 13th Army Corps, Dept. of the Gulf, to September, 1863. 2nd Brigade, Cavalry Division, Dept. of the Gulf, to December, 1863, when rejoined Regiment in 1st Brigade, 1st Cavalry Division, 16th Army Corps, to April, 1864. 3rd Brigade, 1st Cavalry Division, 16th Army Corps, to June, 1864. 1st Brigade, Cavalry Division, District of West Tennessee, to July, 1864. 1st Brigade, 1st Cavalry Division, District of West Tennessee, to November, 1864. 1st Brigade, 5th Division, Cavalry Corps, Military Division Mississippi, to May, 1865. Dept. of the Northwest to October, 1865.

SERVICE.-Fremont's Campaign against Springfield, Mo., October 23-November 2, 1861. Moved to Rolla November 13–19, and duty there till January, 1862. Curtis' advance on Springfield February 2–13. Marshfield, Mo., February 9. Pursuit of Price into Arkansas February 14–29. Pott's Hill, Sugar Creek, February 16. Sugar Creek February 17. Bentonville February 17. Battles of Pea Ridge March 6–8. Expedition to Fayetteville March 15. March to Batesville, Ark., April 5-May 3. Talbot's Ferry, White River, April 19. Fairview, Little Red River, June 7 (Co. "L"). Scouts from Batesville June 16–17. March to Helena, Ark., June 26-July 14. Helena July 14. Duty near Helena, Ark., till December. Expedition from Helena to Arkansas Post November 16–21. Expedition to Grenada, Miss., November 27-December 5. Oakland December 3. Sherman's Yazoo Expedition December 22, 1862, to January 3, 1863. Chickasaw Bayou December 26–28. Chickasaw Bluff December 29. Expedition to Arkansas Post, Ark., January 3–11, 1863. Capture of Fort Hindman, Arkansas Post, January 10–11. Milliken's Bend January 21. Richmond January 29. 5 Companies, "B," "C," "F," "H," and "I," ordered to Memphis, Tenn., February, 1863. Other Companies remained on duty with 13th Army Corps to August, 1863. Company "D" with 1st Division, 15th Army Corps, to July, then with Arkansas Expedition till December, 1863.

Companies "A", "E", "G", "K", "L" and "M"-Operations from Milliken's Bend to New Carthage March 31-April 17, 1863 (Cos. "A" and "K"). Near New Carthage April 5 (Cos. "A" and "K"). Movement on Bruinsburg and turning Grand Gulf April 25–30. Battle of Port Gibson May 1. Near Black River May 5 (Detachment). Battle of Champion's Hill May 16. Big Black River Bridge May 17. Siege of Vicksburg May 18-July 4. Assaults on Vicksburg May 19 and 22. Edwards' Station June 10. Advance on Jackson, Miss., July 4–10. Edwards' Station July 6. Near Baker's Creek July 7. Bolton's Depot July 8. Near Clinton July 8. Near Jackson July 9. Siege of Jackson July 10–17. Brookhaven July 18. Moved to New Orleans, La., August. Campaign in Western Louisiana, operations in Teche Country October 3-November 30. Vermilion Bayou October 9–10. Opelousas and Barre Landing October 21. Washington October 24. Vermilionville November 5. Carrion Crow Bayou November 11. Vermilionville November 11. Camp Pratt November 20 and 25. Vermilionville November 25. Near Baton Rouge March 3, 1864 (Detachment). Jackson March 3, 1864 (Detachment). Livonia March 30. Near Port Hudson April 7 (Detachment). Companies rejoined Regiment at Memphis, Tenn., December, 1863.

Companies "B", "C", "F", "H" and "I"-Coldwater and Cochran's Cross Roads May 15, 1863. Expedition from LaGrange, Tenn., to Senatobia, Miss., May 21–26. Senatobia May 23. Operations in Northwest Mississippi June 15–25. Scout to Germantown July 8. Mt. Pleasant August 5. Expedition from Memphis to Grenada, Miss., August 12–23. Grenada August 17. Mt. Pleasant August 25. Expedition from LaGrange to Toon's Station September 11–16. Montezuma September 16. Operations against Chalmers' in North Mississippi and West Tennessee October 4–17. Lockhart's Mills October 6. Salem October 8. Ingraham's Mills, near Byhalia, October 12. Wyatts', Tallahatchie River, October 13. Operations on Memphis and Charleston R. R. November 3–5. Operations on Memphis and Charleston R. R. against Lee's attack November 28-December 10. Ripley December 1. Near Moscow December 3–4. Near Corinth Dec. 23 (Detachment).

Company "D."-Expedition to Greenville, Black Bayou and Deer Creek April 2–14, 1863. Jackson, Miss., May 14. Siege of Vicksburg May 18-July 4. Assaults on Vicksburg May 19 and 22. Advance on Jackson, Miss., July 4–10. Siege of Jackson July 10–17. Moved to Helena, Ark., July. Steele's Expedition to Little Rock, Ark., August 1-September 10. Bayou Fourche and capture of Little Rock September 10.

Regiment on Smith's Expedition from Colliersvllle, Tenn., to Okolona, Miss., February 11–26, 1864. Holly Springs, Miss., February 12. Near Pontotoc February 17. Houlka Swamp, near Houston, February 17. Near Okolona February 18. Ivey's Hill, near Okolona, February 22. New Albany February 23. Pontotoc February 24. Germantown May 9. Sturgis' Expedition from Memphis into Mississippi June 1–13. Brice's or Tishaming Creek, near Guntown, June 10. Ripley June 11. Near Holly Springs July 1. Smith's Expedition to Tupelo, July 5–21. Camargo's Cross Roads, near Harrisburg, July 13. Near Tupelo July 14–15. Old Town Creek July 15. Smith's Expedition to Oxford, Miss., August 1–30. Tallahatchie River August 7–9. Hurricane Creek and Oxford August 9. Hurricane Creek August 13–14 and 19. Forest's attack on Memphis, Tenn., August 21 (Detachment). Scout to Mayfield, Ky., and skirmish August 14–15 (Detachment). Moved to Clifton, Tenn., September 27. Operations in Tennessee and Alabama against Hood November–December. Expedition from Memphis to Moscow November 9–13. Shoal Creek, Ala., November 11. On line of Shoal Creek November 16–20. Duck River November 28. Franklin November 30. Battle of Nashville December 15–16. Pursuit of Hood December 17–28. West Harpeth River December 17. Richland Creek December 24. King's or Anthony's Gap, near Pulaski, December 25. At Gravelly Springs, Ala., till February, 1865. At Eastport, Miss., till May. Moved to St. Louis, Mo., thence to St. Paul, Minn. Operating against Indians in Minnesota and Dakota July 4 to October 1. Mustered out October 18, 1865.

== Total strength and casualties ==
The regiment suffered 8 officers and 50 enlisted men who were killed in action or who died of their wounds and 3 officers and 173 enlisted men who died of disease, for a total of 234 fatalities.

== Commanders ==
- Colonel Eugene A. Carr - promoted to brigadier general March 7, 1862
- Colonel Lafayette McCrillis - mustered out September 5, 1864
- Colonel Robert H. Carnahan - mustered out October 10, 1865

== Other notable personages ==
- Fanny Wilson of New York

Note: This article, after the introduction, is taken entirely from Dyer, Frederick H. A Compendium of the War of Rebellion: Compiled and Arranged From Official Records of the Federal and Confederate Armies, Reports of the Adjutant Generals of the Several States, The Army Registers and Other Reliable Documents and Sources. First published 1908 by Dyer Publishing. Retrieved January 29, 2018. Pages 1022-1023 and Federal Publishing Company. Vol. 3 The Union Army; A History of Military Affairs in the Loyal States, 1861–65 — Records of the Regiments in the Union Army — Cyclopedia of Battles — Memoirs of Commanders and Soldiers. Wilmington, NC: Broadfoot Publishing, 1997. First published 1908 by Federal Publishing Company. Pages 346–347. These are sources in the public domain because they were published before 1923. If the source content has been copied in its entirety to a National Park Service or other United States government site, it would be in the public domain in the United States because it is a work of the United States Federal Government under the terms of Title 17, Chapter 1, Section 105 of the US Code in addition to being works published before 1923.

== See also ==
- List of Illinois Civil War Units
- Illinois in the American Civil War
