= Daniel Dunklin =

American politician (1790–1844)

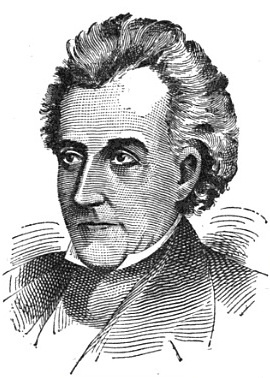

5th Governor of Missouri
- In office November 19, 1832 – September 30, 1836
- Lieutenant: Lilburn W. Boggs
- Preceded by: John Miller
- Succeeded by: Lilburn W. Boggs

3rd Lieutenant Governor of Missouri
- In office November 17, 1828 – November 19, 1832
- Governor: John Miller
- Preceded by: Vacant
- Succeeded by: Lilburn Boggs

Personal details
- Born: January 14, 1790 Near Greenville, South Carolina, US
- Died: August 25, 1844 (aged 54) Herculaneum, Missouri, US
- Resting place: Gov. Daniel Dunklin's Grave State Historic Site
- Party: Democratic Party
- Spouse: Emily Willis "Pamela" Haley
- Children: One son, five daughters
- Profession: Merchant, farmer, politician

Military service
- Branch/service: Missouri territorial militia
- Years of service: 1812–1815
- Battles/wars: War of 1812

Daniel Dunklin (January 14, 1790 – August 25, 1844) was the fifth governor of Missouri, serving from 1832 to 1836. He also served as the state's third lieutenant governor of Missouri. Dunklin is considered the "Father of Public Schools" in Missouri. Dunklin was also the father-in-law of Missouri Lieutenant Governor Franklin Cannon. Dunklin County, in the Missouri bootheel, is named so in his honor.

== Early life ==
Daniel Dunklin was born to Sarah Margaret (Sullivan) and Joseph Dunklin Jr. in 1790 in Greenville, South Carolina. In 1805 Daniel's father purchased land in Caldwell County, Kentucky and intended to move his family there. However he died before the move could happen. Dunklin's older brother and mother were successful in moving the family the next year. The teenage Dunklin worked unsuccessfully at farming while he also studied the writings of William Blackstone and others in hopes of a career as a lawyer. In late 1810 Daniel Dunklin and his mother left Kentucky and moved to Louisiana Territory (Missouri Territory after 1812), living first in Ste. Genevieve then in 1811 settling in the area around present-day Potosi on a parcel of ground he received through a Spanish land grant. During the War of 1812 Dunklin served with the Missouri militia, seeing battle in several actions in Missouri and Illinois.

Following the war Daniel Dunklin traveled back to Kentucky for a short time so that he might marry his childhood sweetheart, Emily Willis "Pamela" Haley, on May 2, 1815. Soon after the couple returned to the Potosi area where Dunklin engaged in mining activities as well as built and ran a tavern. By this time Dunklin had also fulfilled an earlier dream and was a practicing frontier lawyer in Potosi and elsewhere in the region.

== Public service ==
In 1815 territorial Governor William Clark appointed Daniel Dunklin sheriff of Washington county, a position he would hold until 1821. With the coming of statehood for Missouri came the need for a state constitution. Elected a member of the Missouri constitutional convention in 1820, Dunklin spent several years serving in the state government he helped create. Daniel Dunklin was elected to the Missouri House of Representatives, where he served for a year. He then returned to his many business affairs in Potosi until 1828 when he was elected Missouri's third Lieutenant Governor.

== Governorship ==
In the 1832 election, Daniel Dunklin rose to the state's highest office when he defeated John Bull of the Anti-Jacksonian Party 50.8-percent to 45.2-percent to become Missouri's fifth Governor. Dunklin hailed from the "Old guard" Jeffersonian school of politics. As such, he opposed the Second Bank of the United States, supported internal improvements at the state level, and opposed high tariffs on states' rights grounds. Like Missouri Senator Thomas Hart Benton and other Jacksonian Democrats, Dunklin favored hard-money currency. As governor, he also controlled a network of political patronage at the state capitol in Jefferson City. Under the patronage system, newspaper editors and other men of middling means could pledge their loyalty to the party by writing favorable editorials, endorsing candidates, organizing political meetings, and galvanizing voters. Governors and other party leaders could then reward editors by hiring them to run postal routes, providing them with subscribers, or by doling out lucrative printing contracts. Calvin Gunn and John Steele were two editors that received contracts from Dunklin for printing legislative debates at the state capitol.

In 1833 one of Dunklin's earliest acts as Governor was to appoint a commission on education. This three member body would determine the needs of the state and draw up a plan for public education facilities. The commissions report was presented to the Governor in 1834 and through his efforts its recommendations were approved by the legislature the next year. Effectively establishing a state board of education, standards, and a means of funding, it placed Missouri among the forefront in educating its citizens, outshining even some long-established eastern states. Governor Dunklin also laid the groundwork for the establishment of the University of Missouri when, in 1834, he recommended land sales to fund a state university and a site be chosen for its construction. During his tenure Missouri's debt was significantly reduced and nine new counties were added. Dunklin also oversaw the construction of the Missouri State Penitentiary during his time in office and pushed for less corporal punishment in the state's penal system.

=== The Latter-day Saint issue ===
One area of controversy during Dunklin's administration was the treatment of Mormon settlers in the state. In 1831, Joseph Smith had established an outpost of the Church of Christ (Latter Day Saints) in Jackson County, Missouri, stating that the City of Zion would be established there near the town of Independence. Alarmed at the large influx of new residents and fearful of losing political influence, a series of vigilante incidents by non-Mormons led to the forced expulsion of the Mormon pilgrims to nearby Clay County, Missouri in 1833. Smith petitioned Governor Dunklin for assistance in the matter. However Dunklin suggested that the Mormons seek redress to their issues in the court system., stating in an October 1833 letter "make a trial of the efficacy of the laws; the judge of your circuit is a conservator of the peace. If an affidavit is made before him by any of you, that your lives are threatened and you believe them in danger, it would be his duty to have the offenders apprehended and bind them to keep peace." The perception of a promise from Dunklin, to provide armed support from state troops (in restoring the Mormons to their lands in Jackson County), played a role in the plans of Zion's Camp. The Mormon issue would continue to be a problem in Missouri politics for Dunklin's successor, Lilburn Boggs, until Boggs issued Missouri Executive Order 44 the so-called "Extermination Order".

Governor Daniel Dunklin resigned his position in the summer of 1836, having been granted a Federal appointment by President Andrew Jackson as Surveyor General for Missouri and Illinois. In that position over the next four years he surveyed nearly all counties in the state below the Missouri River. In 1843 he would again be involved with surveying, serving on a commission to settle the Missouri-Arkansas border.

== Later life ==
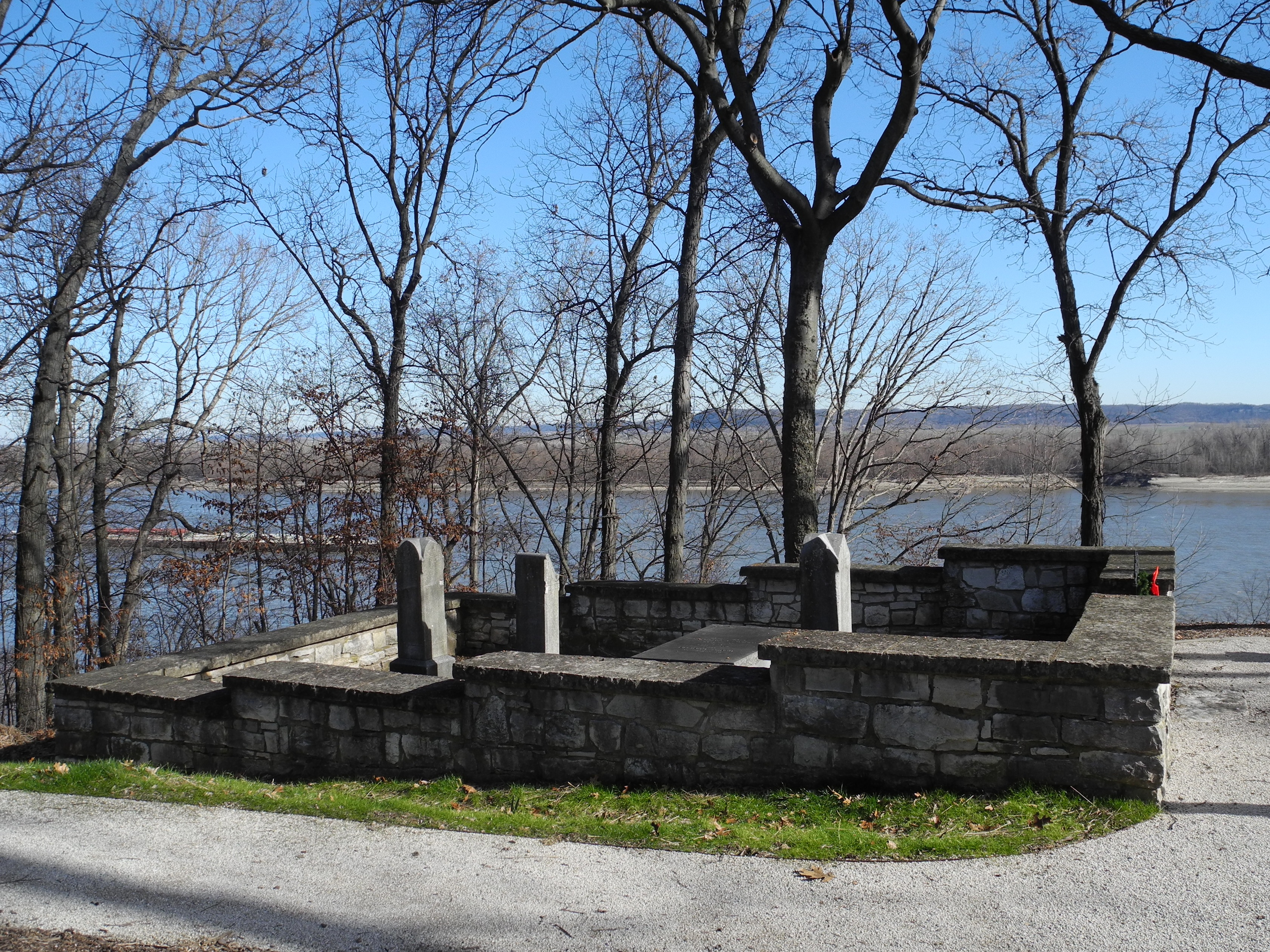
Gravesite of Daniel Dunklin in Herculaneum

Other than the aforementioned Arkansas border commission, Daniel Dunklin turned the remaining years of his life to his business and family matters. In 1840 Dunklin sold off all his property and business concerns in the Potosi area and moved to farmland near Herculaneum, Missouri. Enjoying the life of a wealthy gentleman farmer, Dunklin was caught out in the open during a severe storm. Soaked to the bone, he developed pneumonia and died shortly after on August 25, 1844. Governor Dunklin was buried in a field near his home. However, his children were not as successful in business and were forced to sell the estate. A small section was reserved as a family cemetery and the bodies of the late governor and his wife were exhumed and reburied there. Today the cemetery is maintained as the Gov. Daniel Dunklin's Grave State Historic Site.

Party political offices
Preceded by John Miller	Democratic nominee for Governor of Missouri; 1832	Succeeded by Lilburn Boggs
Political offices
Preceded by Benjamin Harrison Reeves	Lieutenant Governor of Missouri; 1828–1832	Succeeded by Lilburn Boggs
Preceded by John Miller	Governor of Missouri; 1832–1836	Succeeded by Lilburn Boggs
