= Missouri Historical Review =

Academic journal of history published by the State Historical Society of Missouri

- Discipline: American history
- Language: English

Publication details
- History: 1906-present
- Publisher: State Historical Society of Missouri (United States)
- Frequency: Quarterly

Standard abbreviations
- ISO 4: Mo. Hist. Rev.

Indexing
- ISSN: 0026-6582
- LCCN: 08005432
- OCLC no.: 1758409

Links
- Journal homepage; Online archive

The Missouri Historical Review is an academic journal of history established 1906, published by the State Historical Society of Missouri and concerning the history and history related topics of the State of Missouri. It also published reviews of books on or relating to Missouri history.

== See also ==
- Official website
