= 1832 Missouri gubernatorial election =

- August 6, 1832
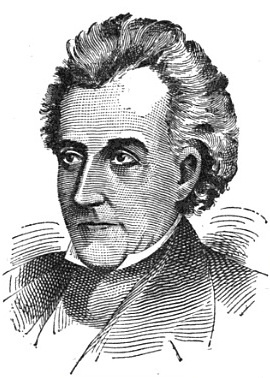

Nominee	Daniel Dunklin	John Bull
Party	Democratic	National Republican
Popular vote	9,141	8,132
Percentage	50.85%	45.24%
- County results Dunklin: 40–50% 50–60% 60–70% 70–80% Bull: 50–60% 60–70% 70–80%
Governor before election
John Miller
Democratic
Elected Governor
Daniel Dunklin
Democratic

The 1832 Missouri gubernatorial election was held on August 6, 1832. Lt. Governor Daniel Dunklin, the Jacksonian candidate was elected over John Bull, the Anti-Jacksonian candidate.

== Results ==
1832 gubernatorial election, Missouri
Party	Candidate	Votes	%	±%
Democratic	Daniel Dunklin	9,141	50.85	−49.15
National Republican	John Bull	8,132	45.24	+45.24
Independent	Samuel C. Dorriss	388	2.16	
Independent	Smith, First Name Unknown	314	1.75	
Majority		1,009	5.61	
Turnout		17,975	12.80	
Democratic hold		Swing		
