= Samuel Woodson =

Samuel Woodson may refer to:

- Samuel H. Woodson (Kentucky politician) (1777–1827), U.S. Representative from Kentucky
- Samuel H. Woodson (Missouri politician) (1815–1881), U.S. Representative from Missouri and son of the above
- S. Howard Woodson (1916–1999), American pastor, civil rights leader and politician from New Jersey
