= Senator Rollins (disambiguation) =

Edward H. Rollins (1824–1889) was a U.S. Senator from New Hampshire from 1877 to 1883. Senator Rollins may also refer to:

- Frank W. Rollins (1860–1915), New Hampshire State Senate
- James S. Rollins (20th-century politician) (1887–1972), Missouri State Senate
- James S. Rollins (1812–1888), Missouri State Senate
