= Austin A. King =

American politician (1802–1870)

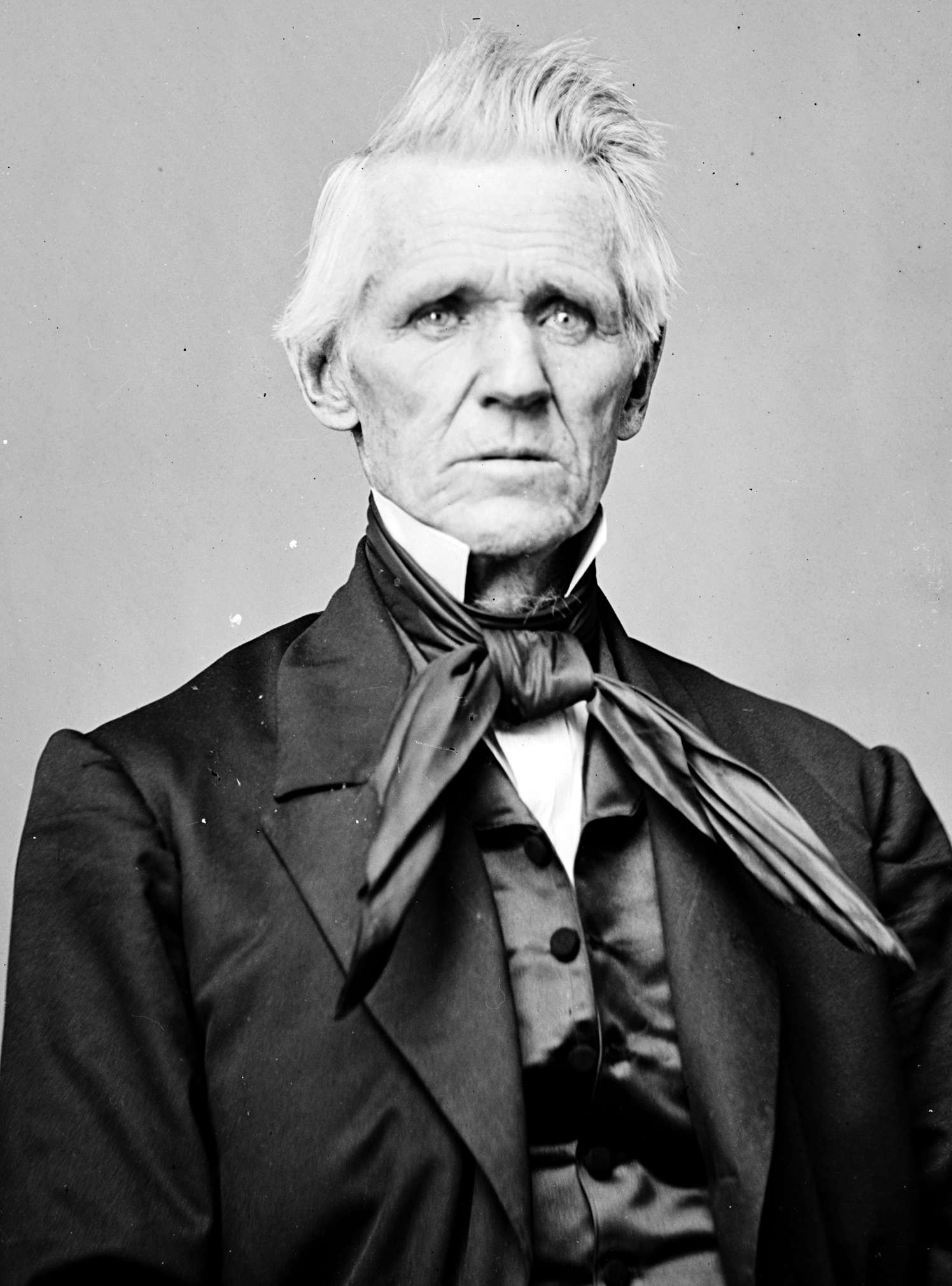

Member of the U.S. House of Representatives from Missouri's 6th district
- In office March 4, 1863 – March 3, 1865
- Preceded by: John S. Phelps
- Succeeded by: Robert T. Van Horn

10th Governor of Missouri
- In office November 20, 1848 – January 3, 1853
- Lieutenant: Thomas Lawson Price
- Preceded by: John Cummins Edwards
- Succeeded by: Sterling Price

Member of the Missouri House of Representatives
- In office 1834–1837

Personal details
- Born: Austin Augustus King; September 21, 1802 Sullivan County, Tennessee, U.S.
- Died: April 22, 1870 (aged 67) St. Louis, Missouri, U.S.
- Party: Democratic
- Spouse(s): Nancy Roberts (1827–1857); Martha Woodson (1858–1870)
- Children: 3 daughters 6 sons

Austin Augustus King (September 21, 1802 – April 22, 1870) was an American lawyer, politician, and military officer. A Democrat, he was the tenth governor of Missouri and a one-term U.S. representative.

== Early life ==
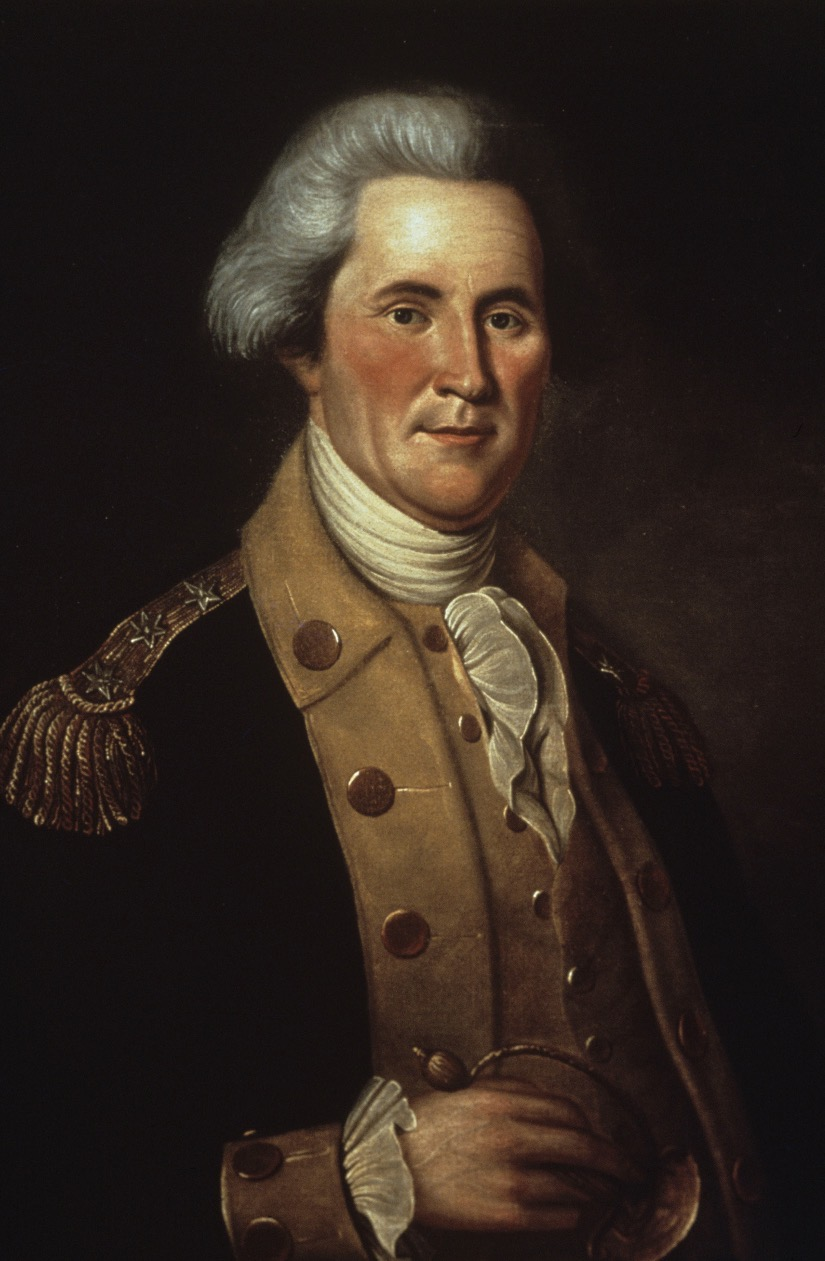
Austin King hailed from a long family line of military and political service. His maternal grandfather, John Sevier, was a U.S. Congressman and Governor.

King was born in Sullivan County, Tennessee, to Walter and Nancy (Sevier) King, one of eleven children. Nancy was the daughter of famed military leader and Tennessee politician John Sevier. King's father was a farmer and often helped him on the farm. Austin King received his education in the frontier schools of his native state and then studied law under an attorney, as was often the case in those times. he also took private lessons in Latin and Greek. King was admitted to the Tennessee Bar in 1822 and practiced in the Jackson, Tennessee, area until 1830 when he moved to Columbia, Boone County, Missouri.

In Columbia, King formed a successful law partnership with John B. Gordon, "riding the circuit"—by horse and sometimes by riverboat on the Missouri River—providing legal services to the communities of central and eastern Missouri. He also became involved with Missouri Democratic politics shortly after arriving. Another early affiliation, and a family tradition along with politics, was military service. With the outbreak of the Black Hawk War in 1832, King was appointed a colonel and served with the First Regiment, Third Division, Missouri State Militia.

== Political career ==
In 1834, King was elected to the first of two terms in the Missouri House of Representatives. Re-elected in 1836, King was known as a strong advocate for improving education in the state. To that end, in November 1836 he introduced legislation for the creation of a college dedicated to educating the teachers who served in the "common" schools of the state. This was the seed of the Normal school concept in Missouri. Throughout his political career, King also supported the establishment of a college in Richmond, Missouri, as well as Columbia College and the 1833 founding of "Columbia Female Academy", later known as Stephens College.

=== As judge ===
King and his family moved to Ray County, Missouri, in 1837 after he was appointed judge of the Missouri Fifth Circuit Court, a position he held until 1848.

During his time on the bench he presided over the trial of Joseph Smith, founder of the Latter Day Saint movement, during the 1838 Mormon War. Smith and sixty of his followers were brought before King in a Richmond, Missouri, courtroom following their surrender after the Battle of Far West in Caldwell County. Charged with long list of crimes including treason, murder, arson, burglary, robbery, larceny and perjury, all but about ten of the Mormons were released by King following an inquiry. However, Smith and the rest were ordered held in the Liberty Jail in Clay County, Missouri. Smith was later allowed to escape custody by his captors and fled Missouri for Illinois.

King remained active in Democratic politics during his time as a judge, being a strong supporter of Martin Van Buren in the 1840 presidential campaign. King was a contender for the Democratic Party's nomination for Missouri Governor in 1844, but lost out narrowly to John Cummins Edwards.

=== As governor ===
1848 was finally King's year to assume the state's top job. Respected by fellow Democrats for his gracious behavior at the divisive 1844 state Democratic convention, he handily won the nomination in 1848 and then beat Whig James S. Rollins in the general election by a margin of nearly fifteen thousand votes. King presided over a time of great growth in Missouri. In his first year in office alone 142 new companies were granted state charters. Although fiscally conservative, King saw the benefits of expanded rail service and thus in 1850 recommended that $3.5 million (~$102 million in 2024) in state bonds be issued to fund two rail projects. Public projects to drain swamplands, build roads, establish a state hospital for the mentally ill, a school for the deaf, and home for the blind were also advancements during his governorship. One area of disappointment for King was the failure of his legislation to establish a state Department of Education and secure more funding for the state university. By the time he left office eight new counties had been established in Missouri.

Despite his gubernatorial record of success, King failed in his next bid for higher office, the 1852 election for Missouri 4th District Representative to the U.S. Congress. Factional discord between Benton Democrats and anti-Benton Democrats split the vote, allowing Whig candidate Mordecai Oliver to win. King returned full-time to his law practice as well as keeping a hand in politics. In July 1855, King was a delegate to the Missouri Slave Owners Convention. Over 200 delegates gathered in Lexington, Missouri, to create a series of resolutions that advocated the position of states' rights held by so many other slave-holding southern states and to also endorse a pro-slavery position for the Kansas Territory. However, King later expressed his opposition to the Kansas Lecompton Constitution and Missourians crossing the border to vote on it.

King was a delegate to the 1860 Democratic National Convention where he campaigned for Stephen A. Douglas, believing a Douglas presidency offered the best hope for preserving the Union. The next year, with Missouri mired in the secession crisis, King spoke out in favor of remaining in the Union and supported the provisional government of Hamilton Gamble. He returned to the bench in 1862, serving as a Missouri circuit judge for about a year before running for U.S. Congress again.

=== In Congress ===
King was successful in his second attempt to serve in Congress, like his grandfather Sevier before him. On November 4, 1862, running as a Democrat, he defeated three other candidates—Peace Democrat James H. Birch, Conservative Democrat Edward M. Samuel, and Emancipationist Henry B. Bouton. King served as the Missouri 6th Congressional District Representative from March 4, 1863, to March 3, 1865. Among the important legislation during his term was the Coinage Act of 1864, establishment of the Freedmen's Bureau, and passage of the Thirteenth Amendment to the United States Constitution. King very much wanted to be reelected for a second term in 1864; however, he was soundly defeated, coming in a distant third to Republican Robert T. Van Horn and fellow Democrat Elijah Hise Norton.

After his election loss, King returned to Missouri and continued his law practice for the few remaining years of his life. King died on April 22, 1870, in St. Louis, Missouri. He was buried in the city cemetery in Richmond, Ray County, Missouri.

== Family ==
King was twice-married. He wed Nancy Harris Roberts in Jackson, Tennessee, on May 13, 1828. She preceded him in death in 1857. The following year, August 10, 1858, in Kingston, Missouri, he married Martha Anthony Woodson. King fathered a total of nine children by his two wives. Sons Walter, William Augustus, Edward Livingston, Henry, Thomas Benton, and Austin Augustus Jr. with his first wife as well as daughter Melvina Elizabeth. Daughters Mary Bell and Nannie were born to King and his second wife. His son Henry died young, at approximately age six, in 1840. His son Austin A. King, Jr. was a pro-Union officer in the Missouri State Militia and later the Missouri Volunteer Cavalry where he attained the rank of colonel.

== Legacy ==
King is the namesake of Kingston, Missouri.

Party political offices
Preceded by John Cummins Edwards	Democratic nominee for Governor of Missouri; 1848	Succeeded by Sterling Price
Political offices
Preceded by John C. Edwards	Governor of Missouri; 1848–1853	Succeeded by Sterling Price
U.S. House of Representatives
Preceded by John Smith Phelps	Member of the U.S. House of Representatives from Missouri's 6th congressional district 1863–1865	Succeeded by Robert T. Van Horn
