= 1876 Missouri Secretary of State election =

- November 7, 1876

| Nominee | Michael Knowles McGrath | Eugene F. Weigel |
| Party | Democratic | Republican |
| Popular vote | 201,921 | 146,427 |
| Percentage | 57.97% | 42.03% |
Secretary of State before election
Michael Knowles McGrath
Democratic
Elected Secretary of State
Michael Knowles McGrath
Democratic

The 1876 Missouri Secretary of State election was held on November 7, 1876, in order to elect the secretary of state of Missouri. Democratic nominee and incumbent secretary of state Michael Knowles McGrath defeated Republican nominee and former Democratic secretary of state Eugene F. Weigel.

== General election ==
On election day, November 7, 1876, Democratic nominee Michael Knowles McGrath won re-election by a margin of 55,494 votes against his opponent Republican nominee Eugene F. Weigel, thereby retaining Democratic control over the office of secretary of state. McGrath was sworn in for his second term on January 8, 1877.

=== Results ===
Missouri Secretary of State election, 1876
| Party | Candidate | Votes | % |
|---|---|---|---|
| Democratic | Michael Knowles McGrath (incumbent) | 201,921 | 57.97 |
| Republican | Eugene F. Weigel | 146,427 | 42.03 |
| Total votes | | 348,348 | 100.00 |
| Democratic hold | | | |

== See also ==
- 1876 Missouri gubernatorial election
