= John Wesley Emerson =

American judge (1832–1899)

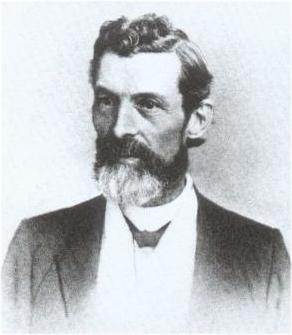
- John Wesley Emerson was a Lawyer, Civil War Major, Company Founder, and Author/ Historian.
- Born: July 26, 1832; Pepperell, Massachusetts
- Died: June 20, 1899 (aged 66); Ironton, Missouri
- Education: University of Michigan
- Military career
- Allegiance: United States of America; Union
- Branch: Union Army
- Service years: 3
- Rank: Major
- Nickname: J.W.
- Commands: 47th Missouri Volunteer Infantry
- Conflicts: Battle of Pilot Knob
- Awards: Purple Heart (2)
- Other work: Lawyer, company founder, historian

John Wesley Emerson (also known as J. W. Emerson) (1832-1899) was an American lawyer, American Civil War commander, Missouri Circuit Court judge, and the founder and principal investor of the Emerson Electric Company.

== Early life ==
Emerson was born to William and Rosannah Ellen (Young) Emerson on July 26, 1832, in Pepperell, Massachusetts.

He attended Iron City College in Pennsylvania, and later graduated from the University of Michigan, at Ann Arbor, Michigan. He studied law under William M. Moffatt, a Pittsburgh, Pennsylvania attorney, and was admitted to the Missouri Bar in 1857. He practiced law in Ironton, Missouri for the remainder of his life.

On September 12, 1855, Emerson married Sarah Maria Young, in Oswego, New York. Sarah was descended from the Young and Elsworth families of Revolutionary war fame.

== Military service ==
He was a volunteer aide (without rank or commission) on the staff of William "Bull" Nelson at the Battle of Richmond, Kentucky in 1862, where he was reportedly wounded.

In 1863, he was commissioned by Missouri Governor Hamilton R. Gamble. He was given the rank of colonel in the 68th Enrolled Missouri Militia, which was subsequently disbanded.

In 1864, he enlisted in the 47th Missouri Volunteer Infantry. His initial rank was Private. Soon he was commissioned major of the regiment.

Detachments of the 47th Missouri were involved in the Battle of Pilot Knob in September 1864. In October, he was tasked by General Rosecrans to reopen the Iron Mountain Railroad from St. Louis, Missouri to Pilot Knob. In this mission he was again wounded in battle.

In December 1864 Emerson's regiment was ordered to assist General George Thomas, at Nashville, Tennessee. His regiment pursued General Hood as far as Alabama, capturing more than 1000 prisoners. Emerson was in command of the regiment through the end of the war.

== After the war ==
Emerson resumed his law practice at Ironton, and was appointed to the Judgeship of the Fifteenth Judicial Circuit Court, which he eventually resigned. After leaving the bench, he was appointed by President Grover Cleveland to the United States Marshall for the Eastern District of Missouri. He served in this capacity for four years.

== Emerson Electric Company ==
In 1890, Emerson met two Scottish orphans, Alexander and Charles Meston, who wanted to manufacture electrical and mechanical devices. He provided $50,000 start-up capital and lent his name to a new corporation creating the "Emerson Electric Manufacturing Company", and served as the company's first President from 1890 to 1892.

In 1892, Emerson retired, selling his interest in Emerson Electric to Herbert L. Parker, a former railroad executive.

== Later life ==
Emerson became a Civil War historian. He joined the Missouri Commandery of Military Order of the Loyal Legion of the United States and wrote a history of General Grant's campaign in the Mississippi Valley.

Emerson died on June 20, 1899, in Ironton, Missouri. His gravesite is in Star of the West Masonic Cemetery on Russellville Road in Ironton, Missouri.

== See also ==
- Emerson Electric Company
- American Civil War
