= 1876 Missouri Attorney General election =

- November 7, 1876

Nominee	Jackson Leonidas Smith	A. W. Mullins
Party	Democratic	Republican
Popular vote	202,703	145,816
Percentage	58.16%	41.84%
Attorney General before election
John A. Hockaday
Democratic
Elected Attorney General
Jackson Leonidas Smith
Democratic

The 1876 Missouri attorney general election was held on November 7, 1876, in order to elect the attorney general of Missouri. Democratic nominee Jackson Leonidas Smith defeated Republican nominee A. W. Mullins.

== General election ==
On election day, November 7, 1876, Democratic nominee Jackson Leonidas Smith won the election by a margin of 56,887 votes against his opponent Republican nominee A. W. Mullins, thereby retaining Democratic control over the office of attorney general. Smith was sworn in as the 18th attorney general of Missouri on January 8, 1877.

=== Results ===
Missouri Attorney General election, 1876
Party	Candidate	Votes	%
Democratic	Jackson Leonidas Smith	202,703	58.16
Republican	A. W. Mullins	145,816	41.84
Total votes		348,519	100.00
Democratic hold			

== See also ==
- 1876 Missouri gubernatorial election
