= Joseph W. McClurg =

American politician (1818–1900)

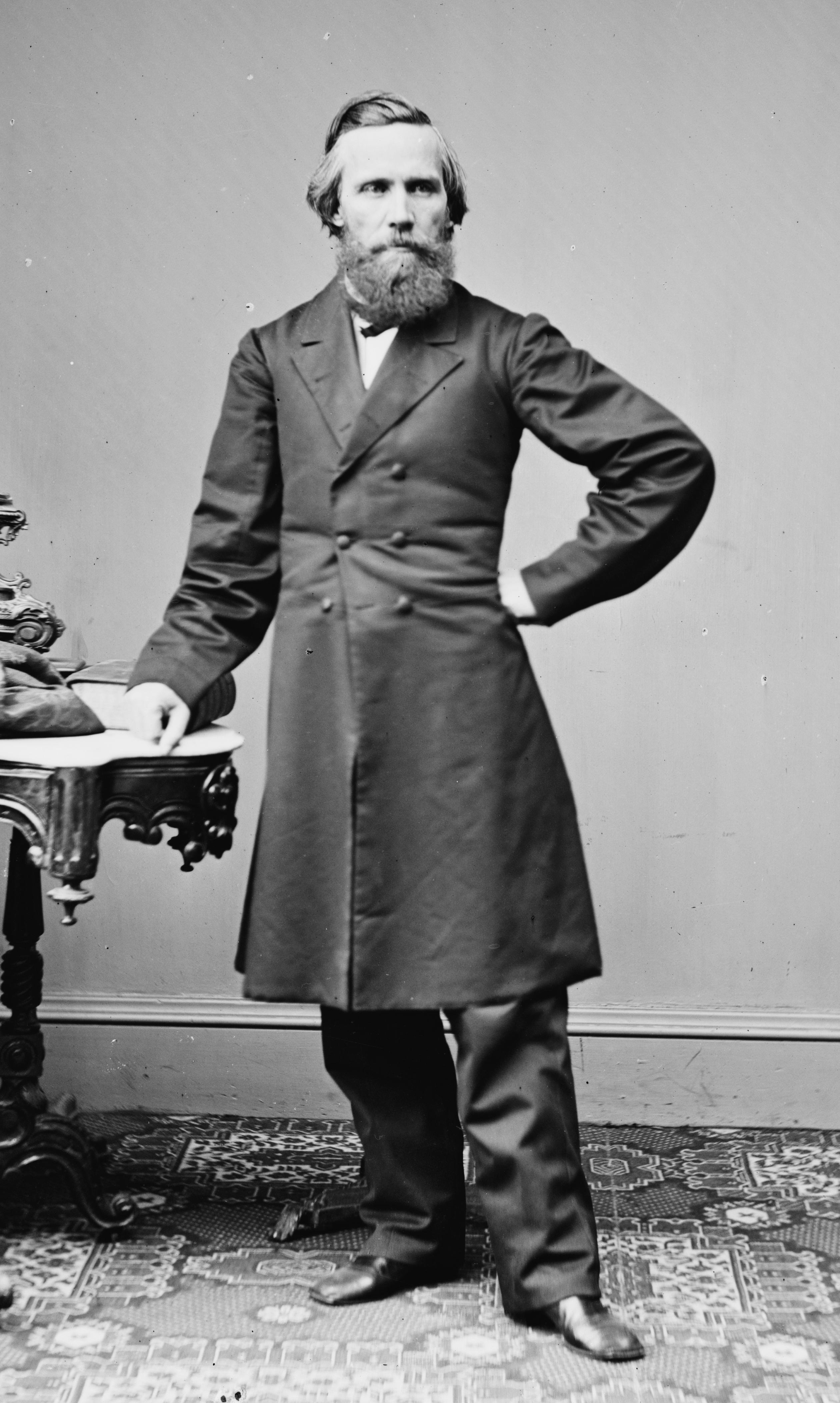

19th Governor of Missouri
- In office January 12, 1869 – January 4, 1871
- Lieutenant: Edwin O. Stanard
- Preceded by: Thomas Clement Fletcher
- Succeeded by: B. Gratz Brown

Member of the U.S. House of Representatives from Missouri's 5th district
- In office March 4, 1863 – July 1868
- Preceded by: Thomas L. Price
- Succeeded by: John H. Stover

Personal details
- Born: February 22, 1818 St. Louis County, Missouri Territory
- Died: December 2, 1900 (aged 82) Lebanon, Missouri, U.S.
- Party: Immediate Emancipation (1862–64); Republican
- Education: Xenia Academy, Oxford College
- Profession: businessman

Joseph Washington McClurg (February 22, 1818 – December 2, 1900) was the 19th governor of Missouri in the decade following the American Civil War. His stepfather was William Murphy.

== Biography ==
Born near St. Louis, Missouri, McClurg was orphaned at seven and raised by grandparents in Pittsburgh, Pennsylvania, where his grandfather owned the city's first iron foundry. Educated at Xenia Academy and Oxford College in Ohio, he taught school briefly in Louisiana and Mississippi in the 1830s before returning to St. Louis to serve as deputy for his uncle, Sheriff Marshall Brotherton. At 19, he studied law and was admitted to the bar in Texas, although he never practiced. In 1841, he returned to Missouri to marry Mary Catherine Johnson. He was involved in lead mining and merchandising and created McClurg's Old Salt Road through rural Missouri to assure a supply of salt for his customers. In 1844, he would operate a store in Hazelwood (the first county seat of Webster County), Missouri with his stepfather.

In 1850, McClurg left Missouri for the gold rush in California, where he opened a miner's store in Georgetown (12 miles from Sutter's Mill). After two years, he returned to Missouri, this time to Linn Creek (now under the Lake of the Ozarks), where he established a thriving business supplying settlers and merchants in Missouri, Arkansas, Texas and the Indian Territory.

An avid unionist, he was a delegate to the historic Gamble Convention in March 1861, in which Missouri agreed to stay in the Union. Although he was later to sign the 13th Amendment as a Missouri Representative, Joseph McClurg was a slaveowner until shortly before the issuance of the Emancipation Proclamation. During the Civil War, McClurg was a colonel of the 8th Missouri State Militia Cavalry, until elected to the U.S. House of Representatives in 1862 as an Immediate Emancipationist. McClurg was subsequently re-elected in 1864 and 1866.

He resigned his last term to run for Missouri governor as a Radical Republican, a party against the re-enfranchisement of ex-Confederates. He served a two-year term and with Radical Republicanism falling from favor, lost his bid for re-election. In 1886, he accompanied his son, Joseph, and his daughter, Fannie along with her six children, to homestead in the Dakota Territory. It was an entrepreneurial venture made promising on the basis of several years of mild weather; however, the winter of 1886-87 was a famously cruel one that convinced the family to return to Missouri. He was appointed Registrar of Lands at Springfield before returning to Lebanon, Missouri, where he died in 1900.

Party political offices
Preceded by Thomas Clement Fletcher	Republican nominee for Governor of Missouri; 1868, 1870	Succeeded by John B. Henderson
U.S. House of Representatives
Preceded by Thomas L. Price	Member of the U.S. House of Representatives from Missouri's 5th congressional district 1863-1868	Succeeded by John H. Stover
Political offices
Preceded by Thomas Clement Fletcher	Governor of Missouri; 1869–1871	Succeeded by B. Gratz Brown
