= 1864 Missouri gubernatorial election =

- November 8, 1864
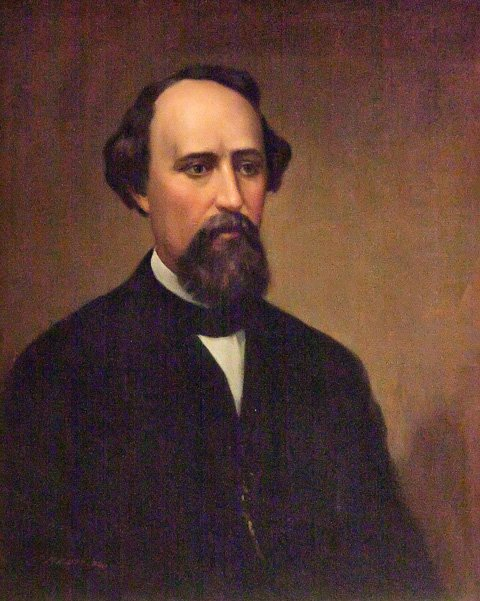

Nominee	Thomas Clement Fletcher	Thomas Lawson Price
Party	Republican	Democratic
Popular vote	73,600	31,064
Percentage	70.32%	29.68%
- County results Fletcher: 50–60% 60–70% 70–80% 80–90% 90–100% Price: 50–60% 60–70% 70–80% No Data/Vote
Governor before election
Willard Preble Hall
Republican
Elected Governor
Thomas Clement Fletcher
Republican

The 1864 Missouri gubernatorial election was held on November 8, 1864, and resulted in a victory for the Radical Republican nominee, Thomas Clement Fletcher, over Democratic nominee former Congressman (and former Lt. Gov.) Thomas Lawson Price. Conducted during the Civil War, all voters were required to take an oath of loyalty to the Union in order to cast their votes, greatly advantaging Fletcher. Simultaneously, the state called a constitutional convention to abolish slavery.

== Results ==
1864 gubernatorial election, Missouri
Party	Candidate	Votes	%	±%
Republican	Thomas Clement Fletcher	73,600	70.32	+66.45
Democratic	Thomas Lawson Price	31,064	29.68	−17.27
Majority		42,536	40.64	+35.68
Turnout		104,664	8.85	
Republican hold		Swing		
