= John William Reid =

American politician (1821–1881)

John Reid
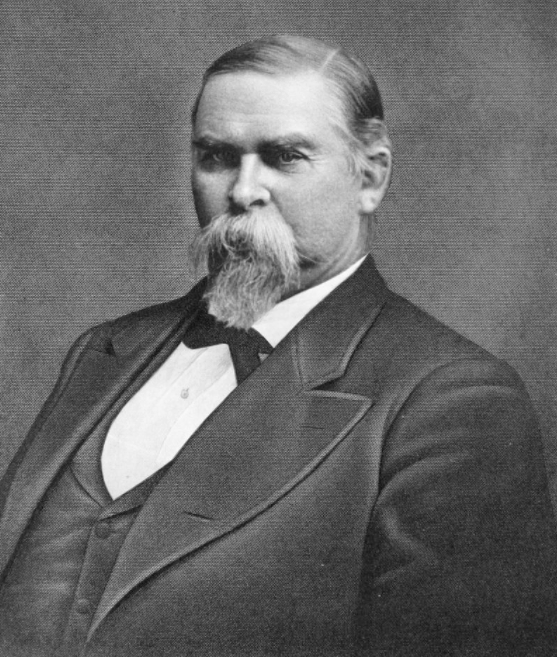

Member of the U.S. House of Representatives from Missouri's 5th district
- In office March 4, 1861 – August 3, 1861
- Preceded by: Samuel Woodson
- Succeeded by: Thomas Price

Member of the Missouri House of Representatives
- In office 1854–1856

Personal details
- Born: John William Reid; June 14, 1821 near Lynchburg, Virginia, U.S.
- Died: November 22, 1881 (aged 60) Lees Summit, Missouri, U.S.
- Party: Democratic
- Spouse: Sallie Cochrane McGraw

John William Reid (June 14, 1821 – November 22, 1881) was a lawyer, soldier, one-time slaveholder and U.S. representative from Missouri.

== Early and family life ==
Born in 1821 near Lynchburg, Virginia. Reid married twice. By his first wife he had daughter Frances Flournoy Reid (1834-_), and sons Thomas Flournoy Reid (1836-) and John H. Reid (1854-1893). By 1860 the motherless family was living with schoolteacher John C. Reid (a decade older than John W. Reid and born in Pennsylvania) and his wife. The widower subsequently married Sally Cochrane McGraw (later Bullene), with whom he had son William McGraw Reid (1866-1936).

In the 1860 U.S. Federal Census, John W. Reid was listed as owning an enslaved 33 year old black woman.

== Career ==
In 1840, Reid moved to Missouri, where he taught school and studied law. He was admitted to the Missouri bar and commenced practice in Jefferson City in 1844.

A captain in the Mexican War, Reid led a company that served in Doniphan's Regiment where he participated in the Battle of Sacramento. During the war, he was wounded twice. He also participated in an expedition against the Navajo in New Mexico.

Back in Missouri, Reid participated in raids against abolitionists in Kansas. He led 200 pro-slavery raiders in August 1856 in what became known as the Battle of Osawatomie, in which later-famous John Brown's son Frederick was among the six free-staters killed; two pro-slavery raiders also died. Reid led the pro-slavery forces that Governor (and later Union General) John W. Geary ordered to disperse from Lawrence, Kansas in September 1856.

Jackson County voters elected Reid to the Missouri House of Representatives, and he served from 1854 to 1856, as well as helped revise the state's statutes. He bought land near the junction of the Missouri and Kansas Rivers in what became Kansas City in 1856, and helped organize the frontier town's Chamber of Commerce in 1857. Reid was elected as a Democrat to the Thirty-seventh Congress and served less than a year, from March 4, 1861, to December 2, 1861. He was one of only two Congressmen to vote against the pro-slavery Crittenden-Johnson Resolution after the First Battle of Bull Run in 1861, and like the other, fellow Democrat and slaveholder Henry C. Burnett of Kentucky, was expelled by the Thirty-seventh Congress on December 2, 1861, for having taken up arms against the Union, although Reid had actually resigned from the U.S. Congress on August 3, 1861. During the Civil War, Reid volunteered in the Confederate States Army as volunteer aide to former Missouri Governor and Confederate General Sterling Price, as well as served as a commissioner adjusting claims against the Confederate Government.

Pardoned after the war, Reid returned to Kansas City, and with Charles Kearney, Theodore Case and Congressman Robert Van Horn helped secure construction of the Hannibal Bridge, the first spanning the Missouri River. When it opened in 1869, it made Kansas City a boomtown, and turned the frontier town into a city, far ahead of railroad hubs Leavenworth, Kansas and Omaha, Nebraska. Reid made a fortune from his resumed legal practice as well as banking and real estate.

== Death and legacy ==
Reid died at Lees Summit, Missouri, November 22, 1881, survived by his second wife and sons, and was interred in what became the family vault at Elmwood Cemetery (Kansas City, Missouri).

== See also ==
- List of United States representatives expelled, censured, or reprimanded

U.S. House of Representatives
| Preceded by Samuel Woodson | Member of the U.S. House of Representatives from Missouri's 5th congressional district 1861 | Succeeded by Thomas Price |
