= Thomas P. Akers =

American politician

Thomas Peter Akers (October 4, 1828 – April 3, 1877) was an American slave owner, attorney, college professor, and member of the United States House of Representatives from 1856 to 1857. He was born in Knox County, Ohio, where he graduated from college and studied law.

He became a school teacher in Kentucky, and moved later, in 1853, to Lexington, Missouri. He became a professor of mathematics and moral philosophy at Masonic College in Lexington, as well as the pastor of a local Methodist church there.

On August 18, 1856, he was elected to the United States House of Representatives as a Know Nothing to fill a vacant seat. A slave owner himself, Akers spoke out against Republican anti-slavery speeches on the floor of Congress, calling them "driveling discussion" and "agitation," and spoke against Catholic immigration to the United States. He remained in his position through the next election.

He moved to New York City in 1861, and became a vice president of the gold board. He subsequently moved to Utah Territory because of ill health, and eventually returned to Lexington, Missouri, where he died in 1877.

== Sources ==
- Who's Who in America, Historical Volume, 1607-1896. Chicago:Marquis Who's Who, 1967.
- United States Congress. "Thomas P. Akers (id: A000070)". Biographical Directory of the United States Congress.

U.S. House of Representatives
Preceded by John G. Miller	Member of the U.S. House of Representatives from Missouri's 5th congressional district 1856-1857	Succeeded by Samuel H. Woodson
