= Thomas L. Price =

American politician (1809–1870)

Member of the U.S. House of Representatives from Missouri's 5th district
- In office January 21, 1862 – March 3, 1863
- Preceded by: John William Reid
- Succeeded by: Joseph W. McClurg

Member of the Missouri House of Representatives
- In office 1860–1862

8th Lieutenant Governor of Missouri
- In office November 20, 1848 – January 3, 1853
- Governor: Austin A. King
- Preceded by: James Young
- Succeeded by: Wilson Brown

1st Mayor of Jefferson City, Missouri
- In office 1839–1843
- Preceded by: Position established

Personal details
- Born: Thomas Lawson Price; January 19, 1809 near Danville, Virginia, U.S.
- Died: July 15, 1870 (aged 61) Jefferson City, Missouri, U.S.
- Resting place: Riverview Cemetery, Jefferson City, Missouri, U.S.
- Party: Democratic
- Profession: Politician

Thomas Lawson Price (January 19, 1809 – July 15, 1870) was a United States representative from Missouri.

== Biography ==
Born near Danville, Virginia, Price attended public schools. He moved to Missouri in 1831 and settled in Jefferson City. He conducted stage lines and engaged in manufacturing and mercantile pursuits. He was the first mayor of Jefferson City, serving 1839–1842. He was an unsuccessful candidate for the State senate in 1845. He was commissioned brevet major general of the Sixth Division of Missouri Militia in 1847.

Price was elected the eighth Lieutenant Governor in 1848 and served from November 20, 1848 until January 3, 1853 under Governor Austin A. King. He served as a member of the State house of representatives 1860–1862. He was one of the incorporators of the Capital City Bank and president of the Jefferson Land Co., and actively engaged in the promotion of various railway lines. He became a Brigadier general of Volunteers in 1861 and 1862.

Price was elected as a Democratic Representative to the thirty-seventh Congress to fill the vacancy caused by the expulsion of John William Reid and served from January 21, 1862, to March 3, 1863. He was an unsuccessful candidate for reelection in 1862 to the Thirty-eighth Congress and an unsuccessful candidate in the 1864 Missouri gubernatorial election. He served as delegate to the Democratic National Convention in 1864 and 1868.

He died in Jefferson City, Missouri, July 15, 1870 at the age of 61. He was interred in a private cemetery. He was reinterred in Riverview Cemetery, Jefferson City, Missouri, in 1912.

Party political offices
Preceded by Claiborne Fox Jackson	Democratic nominee for Governor of Missouri; 1864	Succeeded by John S. Phelps
Political offices
Preceded by James Young	Lieutenant Governor of Missouri; 1848–1852	Succeeded by Wilson Brown
U.S. House of Representatives
Preceded by John William Reid	Member of the U.S. House of Representatives from Missouri's 5th congressional district 1862–1863	Succeeded by Joseph W. McClurg
