= John S. Phelps =

Politician and soldier during the American Civil War, and the 23rd Governor of Missouri

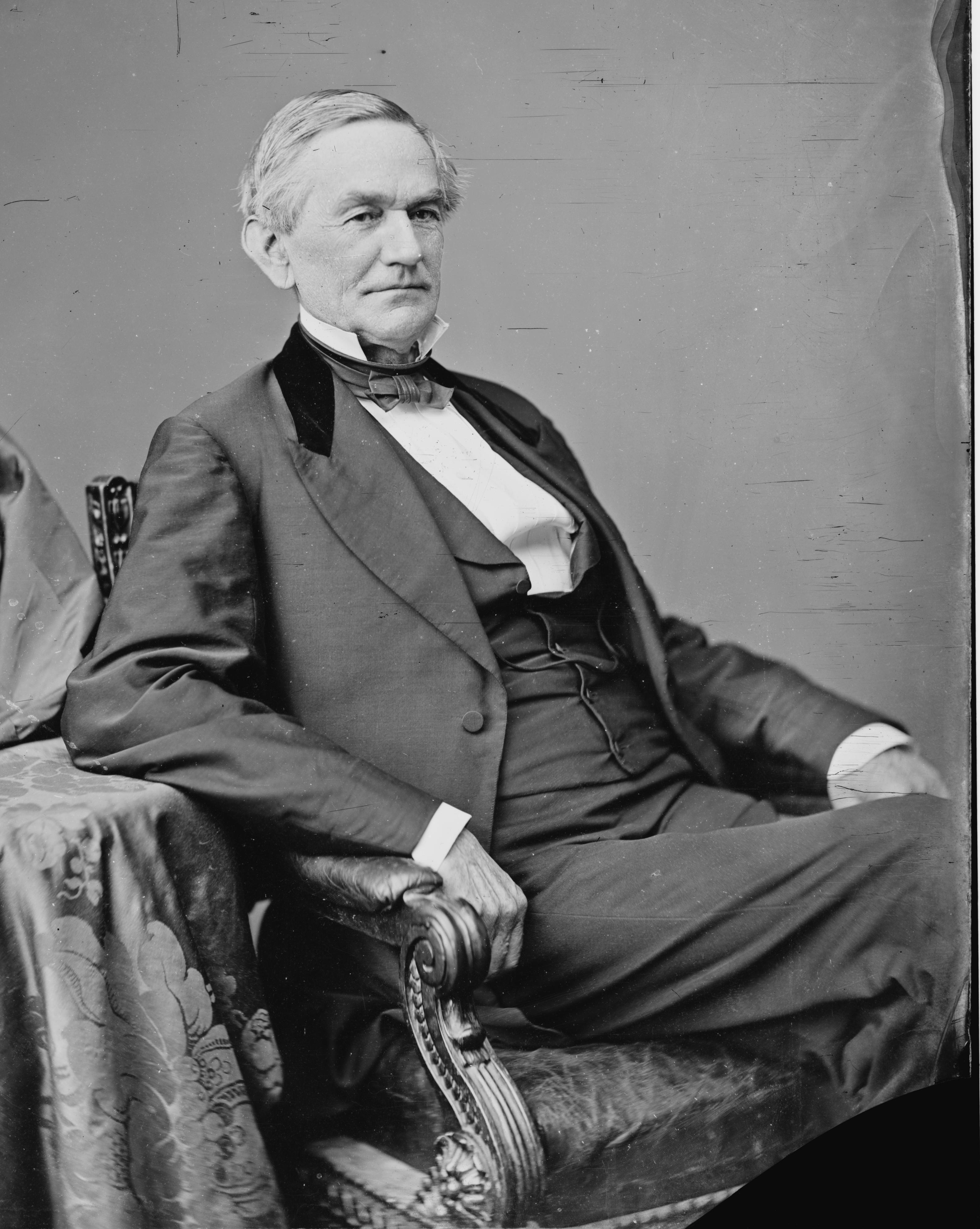

23rd Governor of Missouri
- In office January 8, 1877 – January 10, 1881
- Lieutenant: Henry C. Brockmeyer
- Preceded by: Charles Henry Hardin
- Succeeded by: Thomas T. Crittenden

Member of the U.S. House of Representatives from Missouri
- In office March 4, 1845 – March 3, 1863
- Preceded by: James Madison Hughes
- Succeeded by: Austin Augustus King
- Constituency: At-large (1845–1847); 5th district (1847–1853); 6th district (1853–1863)

Member of the Missouri House of Representatives
- In office 1840-1844

Personal details
- Born: December 22, 1814 Simsbury, Connecticut, U.S.
- Died: November 20, 1886 (aged 71) St. Louis, Missouri, U.S.
- Party: Democratic
- Spouse: Mary Whitney
- Profession: Attorney

John Smith Phelps (December 22, 1814 – November 20, 1886) was an American politician and Union soldier during the American Civil War, and the 23rd governor of Missouri.

== Early life and career ==
John Smith Phelps, the son of Elisha Phelps, was born in Simsbury, Connecticut. He attended common schools and then studied law at Trinity College in Hartford, Connecticut, graduating in 1832. He was admitted to the bar in 1835 and commenced practice in Simsbury. After his marriage to Mary Whitney on April 20, 1837, he moved to Springfield, Missouri, and quickly became one of the leading lawyers in southwest Missouri.

Phelps was elected to the Missouri House of Representatives in 1840. Four years later, on March 4, 1845, he was elected as a Democrat to the Twenty-Ninth Congress, and to eight succeeding Congresses (March 4, 1845 – March 3, 1863). During his 18-year term, he served as Chairman of the Committee on Ways and Means (Thirty-Fifth Congress) and came to be regarded as a champion of government bounties to soldiers, aid to railroads, and inexpensive postage.

Phelps was popular in Washington, D.C., and at home. In 1857, Missourians honored him by naming the newly created county of Phelps after him. He was not a candidate for renomination in 1862.

== Civil War ==
At the outbreak of the Civil War in 1861, Phelps returned to Springfield and enlisted as a private in Captain Coleman's Company of Missouri Infantry (Union). He was promoted to lieutenant colonel on October 2, 1861, and to colonel on December 19, 1861. Following the Union defeat at the Battle of Wilson's Creek, Mary Phelps cared for the body of General Nathaniel Lyon, killed during the battle, while her husband retreated with the Union army to Rolla. By special arrangement with President Abraham Lincoln, Phelps organized an infantry regiment which bore his name, Phelps’s Regiment, Missouri Volunteer Infantry. The regiment spent most of the winter of 1861—62 as the garrison of Fort Wyman at Rolla. In March 1862, Phelps led his regiment in the fierce fighting at the Battle of Pea Ridge in Arkansas. He was mustered out on May 13, 1862. In July 1862, he was appointed by President Lincoln as Military Governor of Arkansas, though the United States Senate did not confirm the appointment.

== Postbellum activities ==
Phelps returned to Springfield in 1864 to resume his law practice. He was an unsuccessful candidate for Governor of Missouri in 1868, but in 1876 was elected to the position as the only candidate who could successfully lead Northern and Southern factions in the state. During his tenure as governor, Phelps supported currency reform and increased support for public education. He retired in 1881.

John Smith Phelps died in St. Louis, Missouri. He rests in Hazelwood Cemetery in Springfield, Missouri.

== See also ==
- List of American Civil War generals (Union)

Party political offices
Preceded by Thomas Lawson Price	Democratic nominee for Governor of Missouri; 1868	Succeeded by Benjamin Gratz Brown
Preceded by Charles Henry Hardin	Democratic nominee for Governor of Missouri; 1876	Succeeded by Thomas Theodore Crittenden
U.S. House of Representatives
Preceded by James Madison Hughes	Member of the U.S. House of Representatives from Missouri's 5th congressional district 1845–1853	Succeeded by John Gaines Miller
Preceded by None	Member of the U.S. House of Representatives from Missouri's 6th congressional district 1853–1863	Succeeded by Austin Augustus King
Political offices
Preceded by Charles Henry Hardin	Governor of Missouri; 1877–1881	Succeeded by Thomas T. Crittenden
