= 1870 Missouri gubernatorial election =

- November 8, 1870
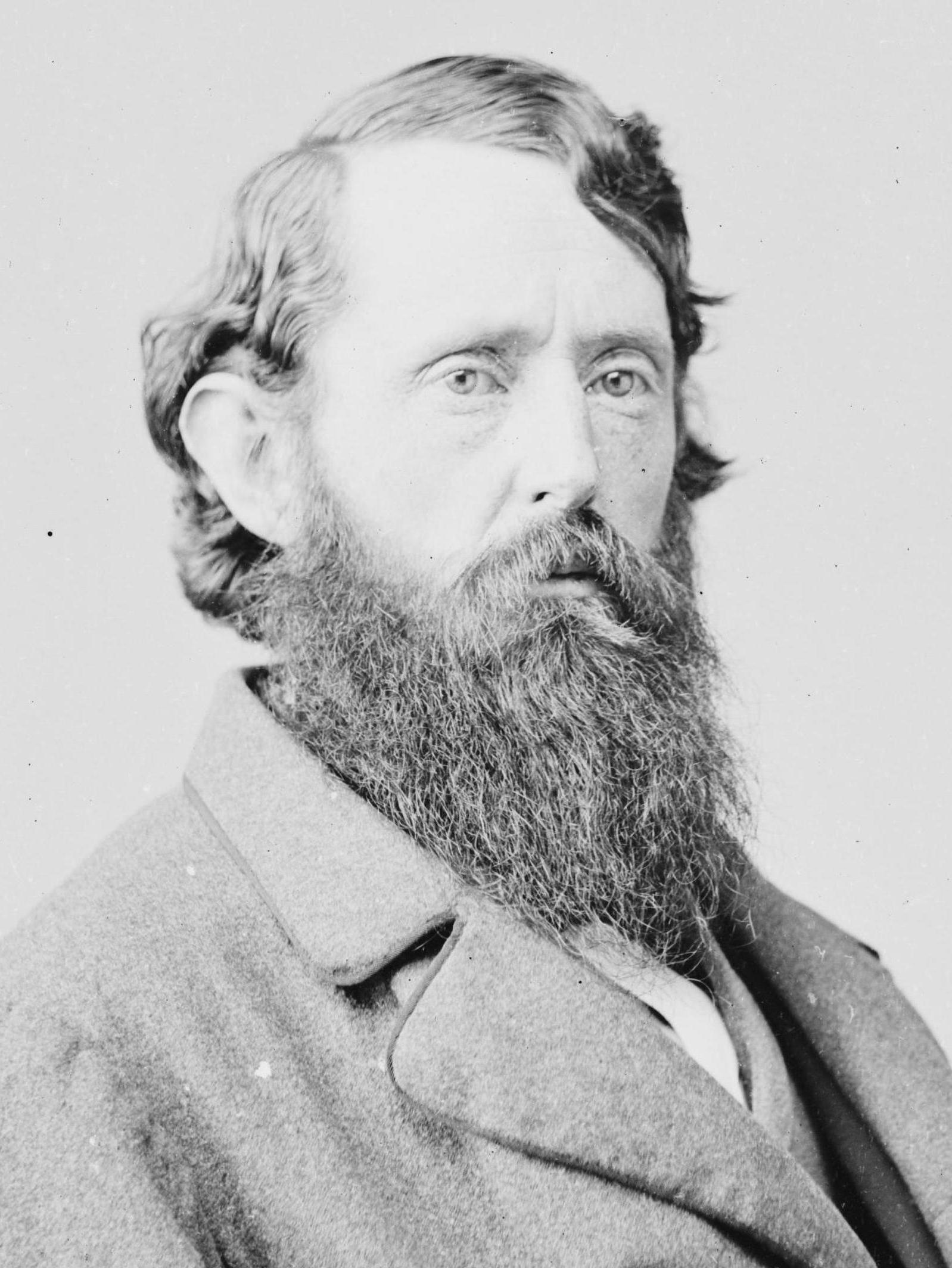

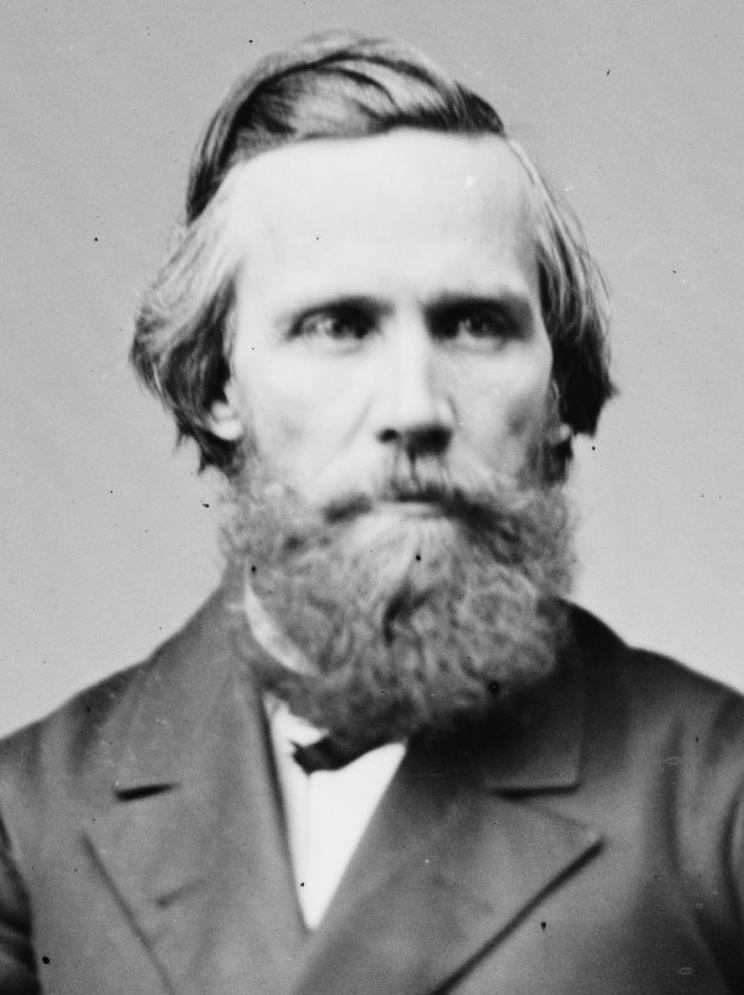
Nominee	Benjamin Gratz Brown	Joseph W. McClurg
Party	Liberal Republican	Republican
Alliance	Democratic
Popular vote	104,374	63,235
Percentage	62.27%	37.73%
- County results Brown: 50–60% 60–70% 70–80% 80–90% 90–100% McClurg: 50–60% 60–70% 70–80% 90–100%
Governor before election
Joseph W. McClurg
Republican
Elected Governor
Benjamin Gratz Brown
Liberal Republican

The 1870 Missouri gubernatorial election was held on November 8, 1870, and resulted in a victory for the Liberal Republican nominee, former Senator Benjamin Gratz Brown, over incumbent Republican governor Joseph W. McClurg.

The election centered on the restoration of political rights for Confederates and Confederate sympathizers, leading to a split in the state Republican Party. In addition to support for re-enfranchisement, Liberals supported tariff reform and were critical of President Ulysses S. Grant, particularly his federal appointments policy. The election grew to become a referendum on Grant's presidency, and Brown's landslide victory would lay the ground for the formation of the national Liberal Republican Party which challenged Grant in the 1872 presidential election.

== Background ==
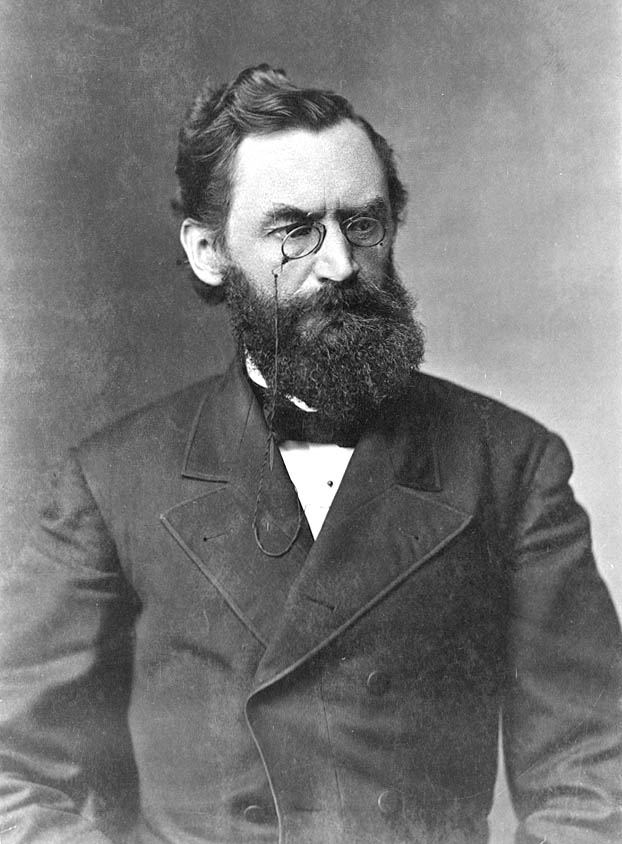
Senator Carl Schurz took a leading role in the Liberal faction, using the Missouri race as a platform to criticize allies of President Ulysses S. Grant and eventually, Grant himself.

During the American Civil War, Missouri had been one of the hotly contested border states, with many residents joining each side of the conflict. After the war ended in 1865, the restoration of voting rights for those who had joined the Confederate States Army was the focus of political debate throughout the country, but particularly in Missouri, a tightly divided state where so many residents would be affected.

In 1865, more radical elements of the National Union Party gained power and instituted a sweeping proscription of rights for those engaged in rebellion. Their new constitution for Missouri was referred to as the "Draconian Constitution" for its loyalty oath provisions, designed to keep all but the most ardent Unionists from participating in government. (Note: The loyalty oath provisions were eventually ruled unconstitutional by the United States Supreme Court in the 1867 case Cummings v. Missouri.)

At St. Louis in December 1866, conservative elements, concerned both with the principle of proscription and its effect on their political power, responded by calling for an equally radical policy of universal amnesty and enfranchisement. Because they were concerned with the political liberty of ex-Confederates, this faction was known as the "liberals," in contrast to the anti-enfranchisement "radicals." The liberals were led by Benjamin Gratz Brown, a former Democratic supporter of Thomas Hart Benton and anti-slavery Union Army veteran. Gratz was joined within the year by Carl Schurz, one of Lincoln's political generals and the leading figure in the German immigrant community and the American Forty-Eighters. Schurz had successfully supported enfranchisement at the 1864 national convention.

In 1869, Schurz won election to the United States Senate as the representative of the liberals, despite the efforts of senior Senator and radical political boss Charles D. Drake. In 1870, differences over enfranchisement had divided the state into distinct Radical and Liberal wings.

In addition to the debate over enfranchisement, federal patronage and tariff reform divided Missouri Republicans. William McKee, publisher of the Missouri Democrat, backed the Liberal movement after breaking with President Ulysses S. Grant over federal appointments in the state; Grant usually passed over McKee's own choices in favor of his own personal friends. Many Missourians also opposed the extension of the wartime tariff measures, which were taken to disproportionately restrict Western agriculture exports to the benefit of Eastern industry.

== Republican Party convention and split ==
The Missouri legislature proposed amendments to the state constitution to be ratified by referendum at the 1870 election which would remove remaining penalties for Confederates. Whether and to what extent to endorse these amendments was the dominant question at the state party convention in August 1870. Radicals presented a resolution declaring for enfranchisement "as soon as it can be done with safety to the State," while Liberals countered with a declaration "unequivocally in favor of the adoption of the Constitution Amendments."

A vote was taken, and the Radical resolution won by a majority of ninety-seven votes. Immediately after the vote, the 250 Liberal delegates withdrew and organized a separate convention. Some Liberals accused Radicals of stacking the convention by manipulating Black voters and holding "snap" caucuses to prevent Liberal participation. After the regular convention failed to resolve the differences between the planks via conference committee, the Liberals announced a ticket of their own, led by Gratz Brown for governor.

The Democratic Party, moribund in the state since the War and the implementation of the loyalty oaths, adopted a "passive policy" of support for Brown and a complete cessation of party activity. The leading Democratic newspaper, the Missouri Republican, eventually openly embraced Brown and the Liberal ticket.

== General election ==
=== Candidates ===
- Benjamin Gratz Brown, former U.S. senator (Liberal Republican-Democratic)
- Joseph W. McClurg, incumbent governor (Republican)

=== Campaign ===
The campaign quickly took on national overtones. The Liberals issued an address, authored by Schurz, which criticized the Radicals for illiberality and corruption and claimed the mantle of "true Republicans." Though Schurz initially tried to remain close to the Grant administration and avoid a national rupture, Grant viewed the split through a partisan lens, as an attempt to turn the state over the Democratic Party. Federal officeholders in the state were openly called to support Governor McClurg and Brown supporters were removed from their offices; Grant wrote to the Collector of the Port of St. Louis:

"I regard the movement headed by Carl Schurz, Brown, etc. as similar to the Tennessee and Virginia movements intended to carry a portion of the Republican party over to the Democracy, and thus give them control. ... I hope you will see your way clear to give the regular ticket your support."

Schurz thus broke entirely from the Grant administration, making disapproval of the President and his 1872 re-election a central theme of the campaign. He wrote to Senator Matthew H. Carpenter:

"...Grant has read me out of the Republican party and is vigorously chopping off the heads of those who are suspected of sympathizing with me. Under such circumstances I have to fight right here. Had not Grant given himself into [Senator] Drake's keeping and interfered in our affairs, we 'bolters' would have swept almost the whole Republican party with us. But the President fighting us (and fighting himself too), we have to work, for we not only want to carry the State, but to carry it heavily."

=== Results ===
Despite the federal policy of interference, Brown won a large majority and the suffrage amendments were adopted overwhelmingly. Two Liberals and four Democrats were elected to the United States House of Representatives, and a joint Democratic majority was returned in the Missouri legislature, with a Liberal-Democratic coalition easily controlling each chamber individually.

1870 gubernatorial election, Missouri
Party	Candidate	Votes	%	±%
Liberal Republican	Benjamin Gratz Brown	104,374	62.27	N/A
Republican	Joseph W. McClurg (incumbent)	63,235	37.73	▼18.94
Majority		41,139	24.54	+11.20
Turnout		167,609	9.74	
Liberal Republican gain from Republican		Swing		

== Aftermath ==
As a result of the Liberal-Democratic victory in the legislature, Francis P. Blair Jr. was elected to succeed Drake in the United States Senate.

Schurz delivered a speech in the United States Senate in December which presented an elaborate exposition and defense of the "Missouri movement," signaling a permanent break with the administration which would later lead to the establishment of the national Liberal Republican Party in opposition to Grant's re-election.
