= B. Gratz Brown =

American politician (1826–1885)

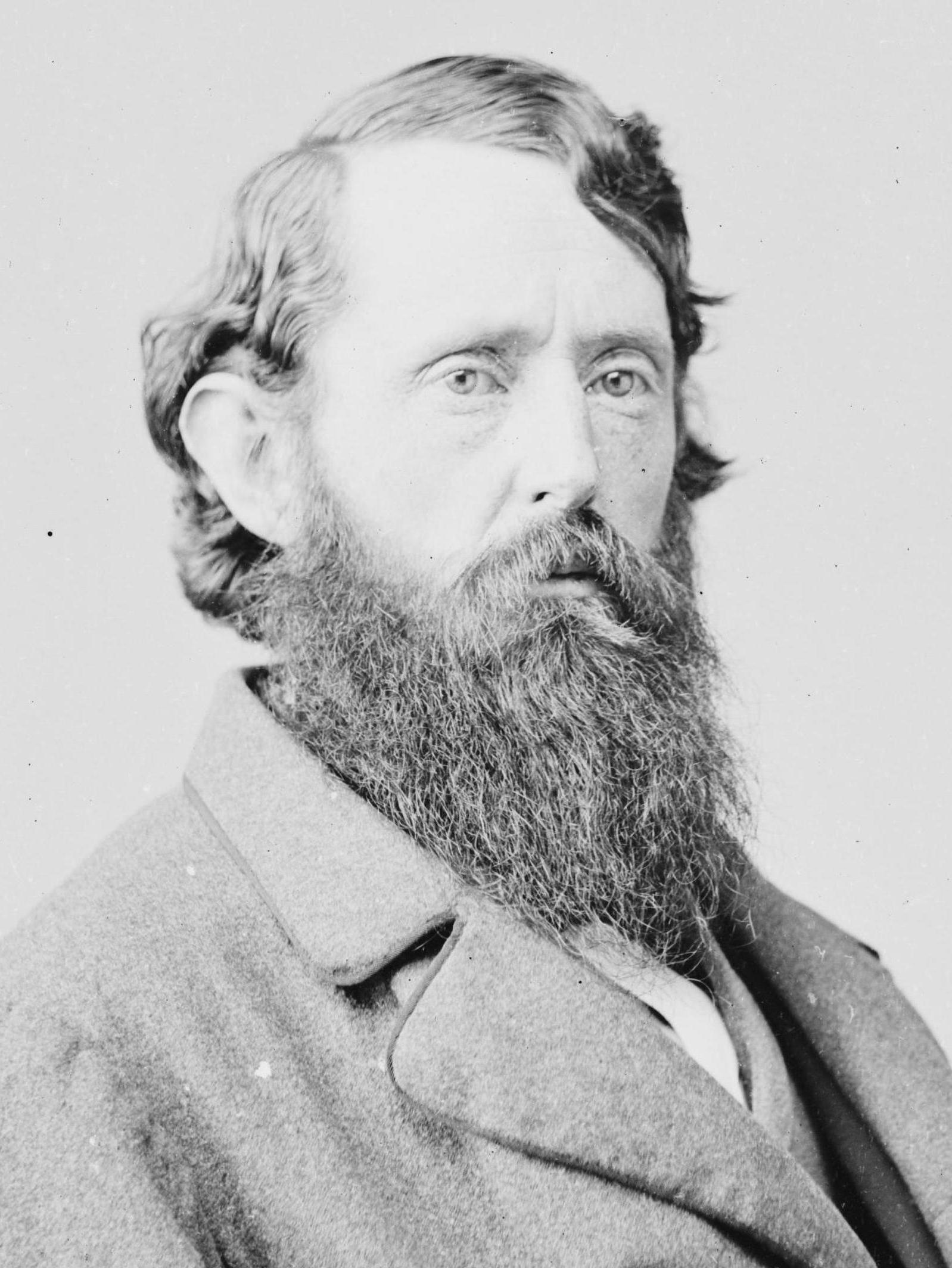

20th Governor of Missouri
- In office January 4, 1871 – January 3, 1873
- Lieutenant: Joseph J. Gravely
- Preceded by: Joseph W. McClurg
- Succeeded by: Silas Woodson

United States Senator from Missouri
- In office November 13, 1863 – March 3, 1867
- Preceded by: Robert Wilson
- Succeeded by: Charles D. Drake

Member of the Missouri House of Representatives from St. Louis
- In office 1852–1858

Personal details
- Born: Benjamin Gratz Brown; May 28, 1826 Frankfort, Kentucky, U.S.
- Died: December 13, 1885 (aged 59) Kirkwood, Missouri, U.S.
- Party: Democratic (before 1854, 1872–85); Republican (1854–62); Emancipation (1862–63); Radical Union (1863–70); Liberal Republican (1870–72)
- Spouse: Mary Gunn (m. 1858)
- Relatives: Mason Brown (father); Montgomery Blair (cousin); Margaret Wise Brown (granddaughter)
- Education: Transylvania University; Yale University (BA); University of Louisville (LLB)

Military service
- Allegiance: United States (Union)
- Branch/service: Union Army
- Years of service: 1861–1863
- Rank: Colonel
- Commands: 4th Regiment U.S. Reserve Corps
- Battles/wars: American Civil War

Benjamin Gratz Brown (May 28, 1826 – December 13, 1885) was an American politician. He was a U.S. senator, the 20th governor of Missouri, and the Liberal Republican and Democratic Party vice presidential candidate in the presidential election of 1872.

Born in Frankfort, Kentucky, Brown established a legal practice in St. Louis, Missouri. Both of his grandfathers, John Brown and Jesse Bledsoe, represented Kentucky in the Senate. After settling in St. Louis, Brown won election to the Missouri House of Representatives. He became an ally of Thomas Hart Benton and Francis Preston Blair Jr. in the struggle for control of the state Democratic Party against pro-slavery forces. As the 1850s progressed, Brown continued to speak against slavery, and he helped found the Missouri Republican Party.

During the Civil War, Brown worked to keep Missouri in the Union. He helped to organize the Emancipation Party that pressured the Missouri provisional government to support the abolition of slavery. In 1863, he was elected to the Senate as a member of the Radical Union Party. In the Senate, he aligned with the Radical Republicans and opposed many of President Abraham Lincoln's policies. He was part of a movement that unsuccessfully sought to replace Lincoln as the 1864 Republican nominee. After the war, Brown strongly opposed President Andrew Johnson's Reconstruction policies and supported the Freedmen's Bureau bills.

Brown resigned from the Senate in 1867 but helped found the Liberal Republican Party in 1870. The party chose Brown as its nominee for governor, and he defeated incumbent Republican Governor Joseph W. McClurg. Brown sought the new party's 1872 presidential nomination but was defeated by Horace Greeley. After the nomination of Greeley, the 1872 Liberal Republican convention chose Brown as the party's vice presidential nominee. Seeking to avoid splitting the vote of opponents to President Ulysses S. Grant's re-election, the 1872 Democratic National Convention subsequently nominated the Liberal Republican ticket. The Republican ticket nonetheless triumphed in the election, as Grant won 55.6% of the popular vote and a majority of the electoral vote. Greeley died after the election but before the electors officially cast their votes, and Brown received some of Greeley's electoral votes. After the election, Brown returned to his law practice and was affiliated with the Democratic Party.

== Early life ==
Brown was born in 1826 in Frankfort, Kentucky, the son of Judith Ann (Bledsoe) and Mason Brown. He was the grandson of Senators John Brown and Jesse Bledsoe of Kentucky. He graduated from Transylvania University in Lexington in 1845 where he was a member of Beta Theta Pi fraternity, and from Yale College in New Haven, Connecticut, in 1847.

He studied law, and later settled in St. Louis, Missouri. There he joined his cousin, Francis P. Blair Jr., and Senator Thomas Hart Benton in a struggle against the pro-slavery faction for control of Missouri's Democratic Party. He was a correspondent for the Missouri Republican at the Treaty of Fort Laramie (1851) and served as the secretary at the treaty negotiations. He married Mary Gunn (1842–1888) in 1858, and together they had six children.

== Political career ==
Speech of the Hon. B. Gratz Brown, of St. Louis, on the subject of gradual emancipation in Missouri - delivered in the House of Representatives (Missouri) Feb 12, 1857

Brown became a member of the Missouri House of Representatives and served there between 1852 and 1858. An able lawyer in St. Louis, Brown made a speech in 1857 against a joint resolution opposing emancipation. The speech marked the beginning of the Free Soil movement in Missouri. He was a leader of the movement. After that, he edited the Missouri Democrat between 1854 and 1859. He was an unsuccessful candidate for Governor of Missouri in 1857.

On August 26, 1856, he fought a duel on Bloody Island with Thomas C. Reynolds (then the St. Louis District Attorney) over the slavery issue. Reynolds was not hurt but Brown was shot in the leg and limped for the rest of his life.

Brown became a founding member of the Republican Party in Missouri. Throughout the 1860s, he and Blair contested control of the state's Republican party. He worked to prevent Missouri from seceding from the Union in 1861. After that, he served as an officer in the Union Army during the first half of the Civil War, raising a regiment (the 4th U.S. Reserves) and serving as its colonel. He recruited over 1,100 soldiers for his regiment, many of whom were St. Louis-area German-Americans, a key constituency that Brown courted for his political advantage.

Brown resigned from the Army after he was elected in late 1863 as a Radical Unionist to the U.S. Senate to fill the vacancy caused by the expulsion of Waldo P. Johnson. Brown opposed Abraham Lincoln's moderation and objected to the Emancipation Proclamation because it did not free slaves in Missouri and other loyal border states. He was a key figure in the move to replace Lincoln with John C. Frémont in the presidential election of 1864. In the Senate, Brown was chairman of the Public Buildings and Grounds committee and of the Committee to Audit and Control the Contingent Expense. Following Lincoln's assassination, Brown was vehemently opposed to new President Andrew Johnson's moderate plan of Reconstruction. He also supported the Radical-sponsored Civil Rights Bill and Freedmen's Bureau Bill. Brown left the Senate in 1867 because of ill health.

In 1870, dissatisfied with the Missouri Republicans, he joined the new Liberal Republican Party. The party nominated Brown for governor, and he defeated Republican incumbent Joseph W. McClurg. Brown served as the Governor between 1871 and 1873.

== Presidential election of 1872 ==
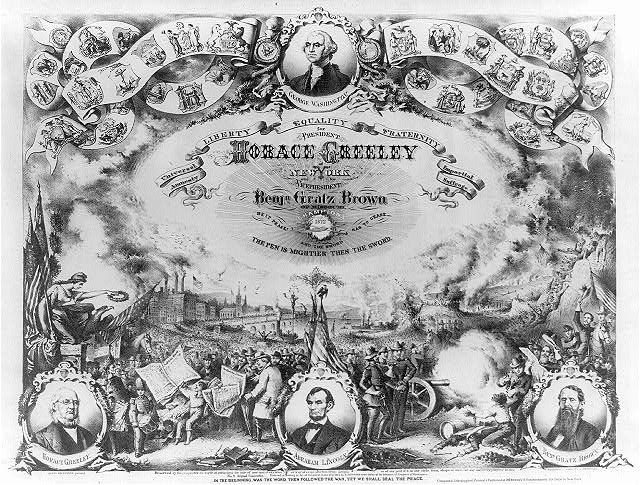
Greeley/Brown campaign poster

Brown was one of the contenders for the Liberal Republican presidential nomination, but lost to newspaper editor Horace Greeley. Brown was the vice presidential candidate under Greeley in the presidential election of 1872 for the Liberal Republican and Democratic parties. Greeley died on November 29 of illness, before the electoral college could vote, and the electoral votes (63 of 66) that were to have been for Greeley were split among four others, including Brown, who received eighteen of those electoral votes. The Republicans, incumbent president Ulysses S. Grant and the vice presidential candidate, U.S. Senator Henry Wilson of Massachusetts, won the election anyway.

Brown returned to his law practice, quit the Republican Party and resumed his ties to the Democrats. He died in Kirkwood, Missouri and is interred there at Oak Hill Cemetery.

U.S. Senate
Preceded by Robert Wilson	U.S. Senator (Class 3) from Missouri; 1863–1867; Served alongside: John B. Henderson	Succeeded by Charles D. Drake
Preceded by Solomon Foot	Chair of the Senate Public Grounds Committee; 1866–1867	Succeeded by William P. Fessenden
Party political offices
Preceded by John S. Phelps	Democratic nominee for Governor of Missouri; 1870	Succeeded by Silas Woodson
Preceded by None	Liberal Republican nominee for Governor of Missouri; 1870	Succeeded by None
Preceded by Francis Blair	Democratic nominee for Vice President of the United States; 1872	Succeeded by Thomas A. Hendricks
Preceded by None	Liberal Republican nominee for Vice President of the United States; 1872	Succeeded by None
Political offices
Preceded by Joseph W. McClurg	Governor of Missouri; 1871–1873	Succeeded by Silas Woodson
