= 1848 Missouri gubernatorial election =

- August 7, 1848
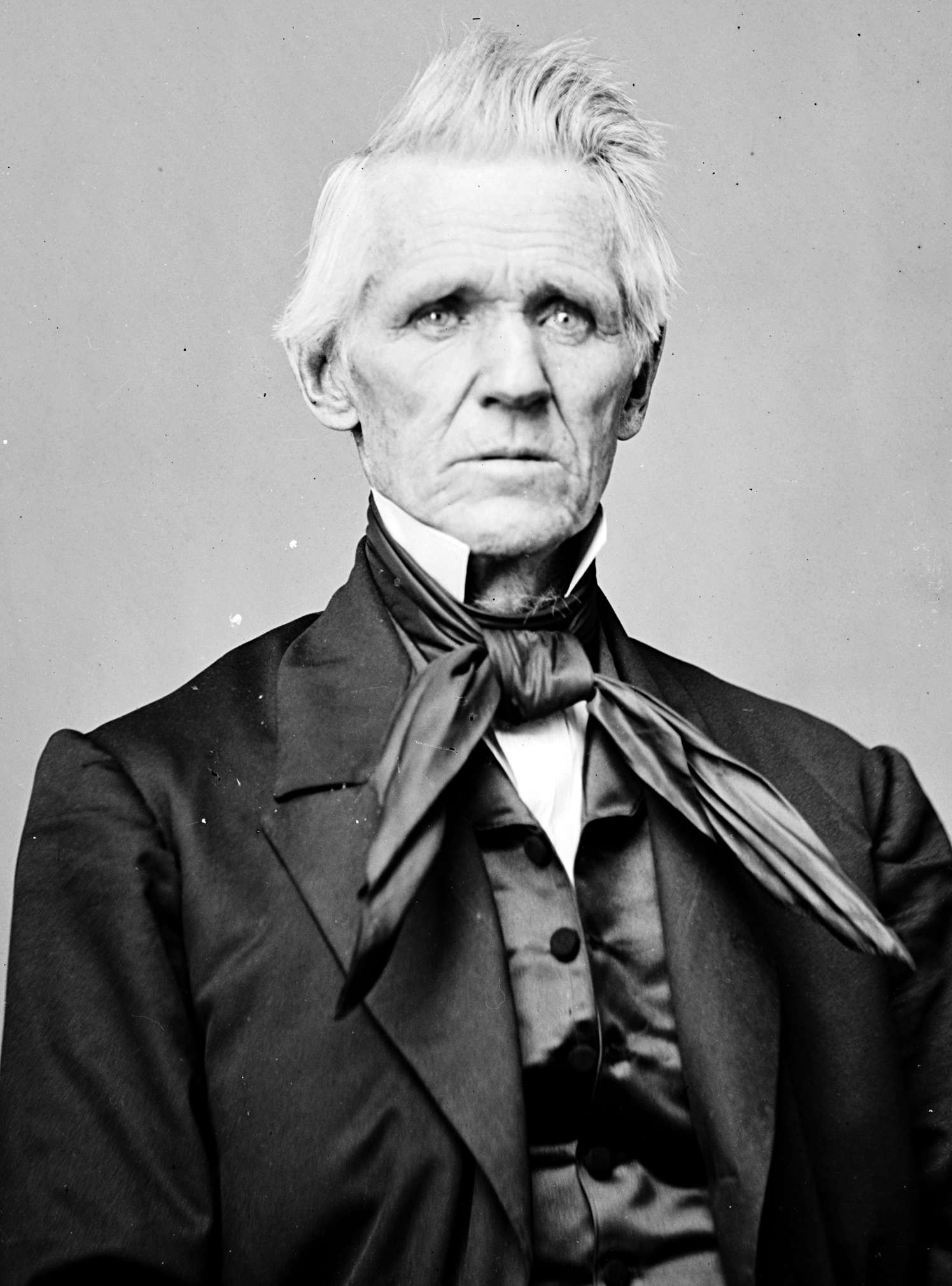

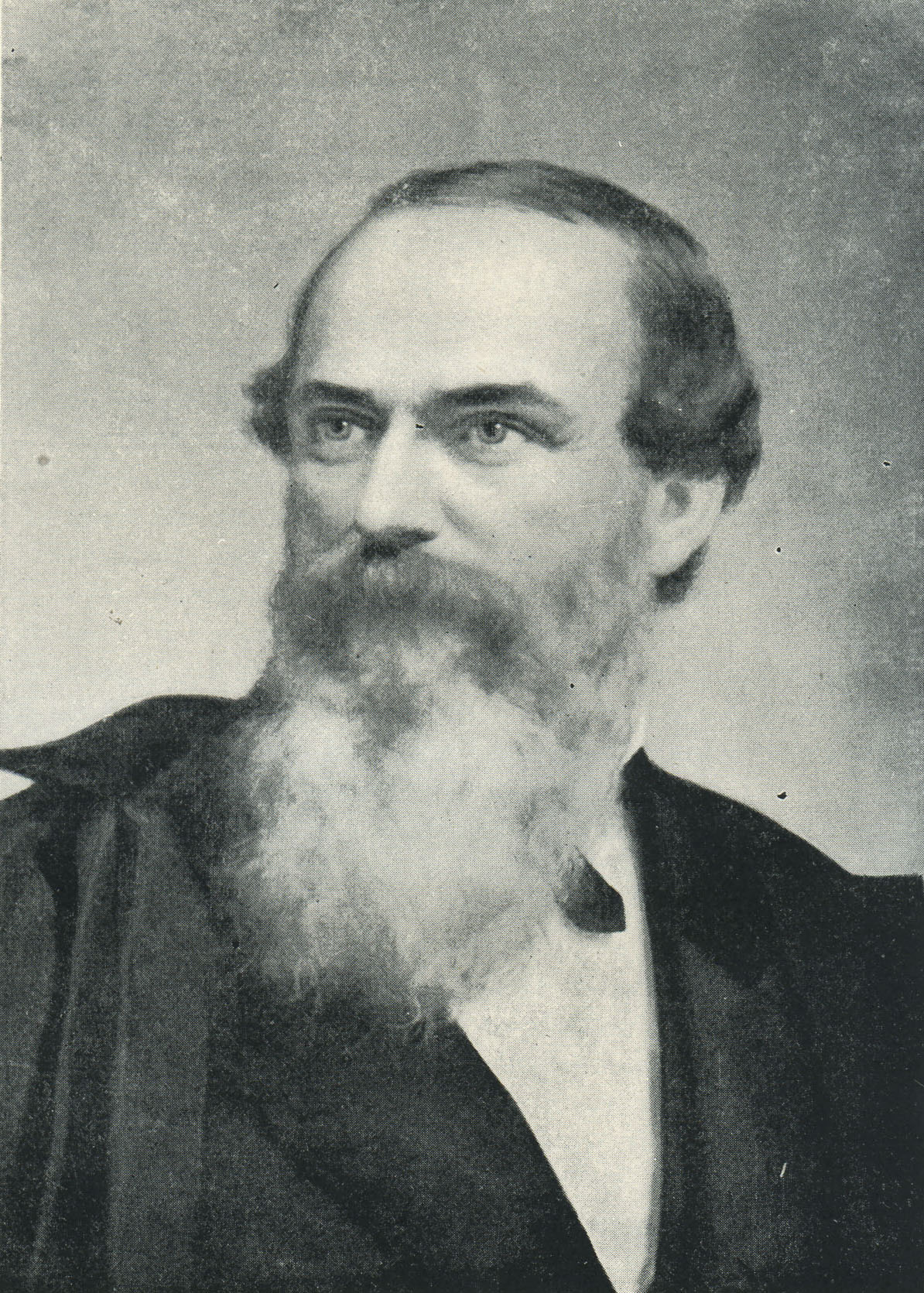
Nominee	Austin Augustus King	James S. Rollins
Party	Democratic	Whig
Popular vote	48,921	33,968
Percentage	59.02%	40.98%
- County results King: 50–60% 60–70% 70–80% 80–90% 90–100% Rollins: 50–60% 60–70% No Data/Vote
Governor before election
John Cummins Edwards
Democratic
Elected Governor
Austin Augustus King
Democratic

The 1848 Missouri gubernatorial election was held on August 7, 1848, the Democratic nominee, Austin Augustus King, defeated Whig candidate James S. Rollins.

== General election ==
=== Candidates ===
- Austin Augustus King, judge of the Missouri Fifth Circuit Court and former State Representative (Democratic)
- James S. Rollins, State Senator from Boone County (Whig)

=== Results ===
1848 gubernatorial election, Missouri
Party	Candidate	Votes	%	±%
Democratic	Austin Augustus King	48,921	59.02	+4.91
Whig	James S. Rollins	33,968	40.98	−4.91
Majority		14,953	18.04	+9.82
Turnout		82,889	21.60	
Democratic hold		Swing		
