= 1868 Missouri gubernatorial election =

- November 3, 1868
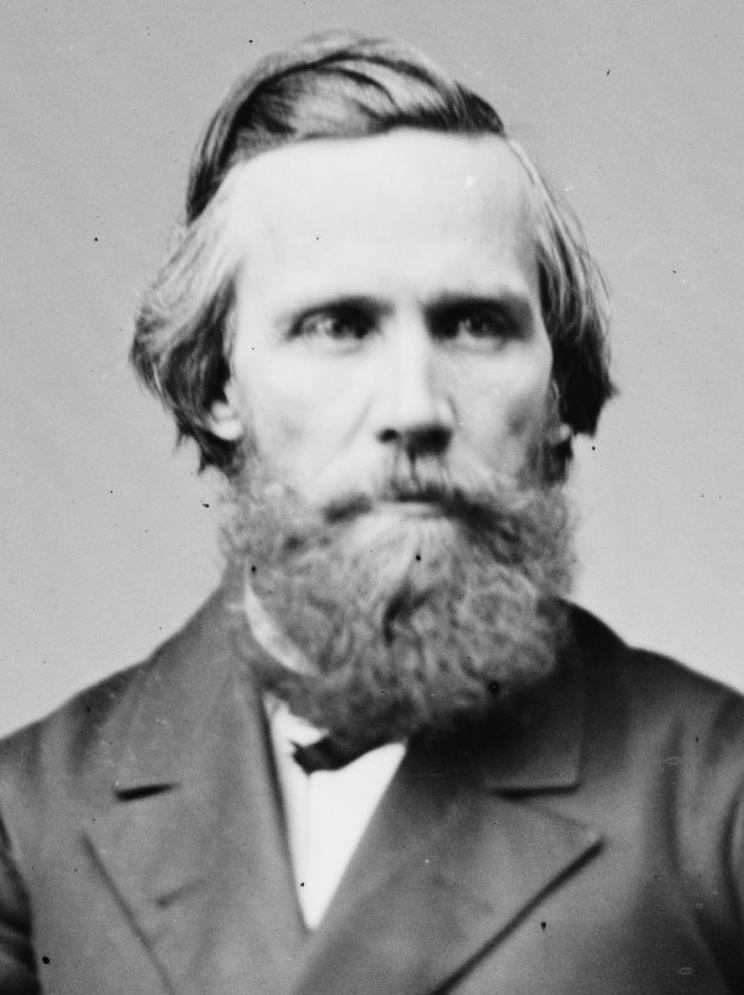

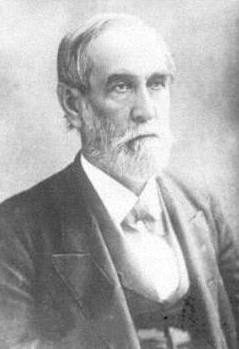
Nominee	Joseph W. McClurg	John S. Phelps
Party	Republican	Democratic
Popular vote	82,090	62,778
Percentage	56.67%	43.33%
- County results McClurg: 50–60% 60–70% 70–80% 80–90% 90–100% Phelps: 50–60% 60–70% 70–80% 80–90% 90–100% Tie: 50% No Data/Vote
Governor before election
Thomas Clement Fletcher
Republican
Elected Governor
Joseph W. McClurg
Republican

The 1868 Missouri gubernatorial election was held on November 3, 1868, and resulted in a victory for the Republican nominee, Congressman Joseph W. McClurg, over Democratic nominee former Congressman John S. Phelps.

This was the first election a governor was elected to a 2-year term, instead of 4 years. Missouri would return to electing its governors to 4-year terms in 1880.

== Results ==
1868 gubernatorial election, Missouri
Party	Candidate	Votes	%	±%
Republican	Joseph W. McClurg	82,090	56.67	−13.65
Democratic	John S. Phelps	62,778	43.33	+13.65
Majority		19,312	13.34	−27.30
Turnout		144,868	12.26	
Republican hold		Swing		
