= Thomas Clement Fletcher =

Governor of Missouri (1865–1869)

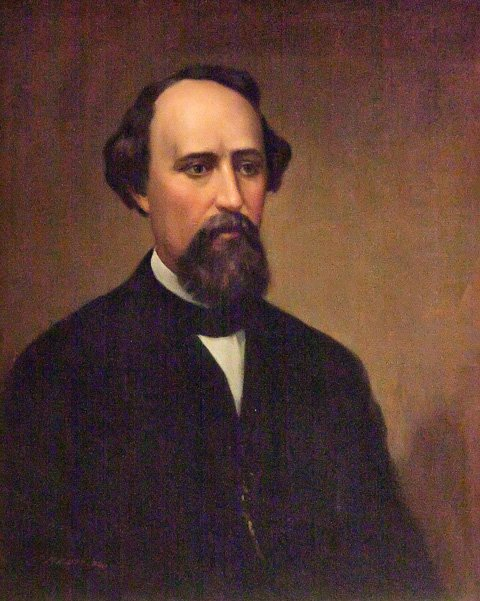

18th Governor of Missouri
- In office January 2, 1865 – January 12, 1869
- Lieutenant: George Smith
- Preceded by: Willard Preble Hall
- Succeeded by: Joseph W. McClurg

Personal details
- Born: Thomas Clement Fletcher; January 21, 1827 Herculaneum, Missouri, U.S.
- Died: March 25, 1899 (aged 72) Washington, D.C., U.S.
- Resting place: Bellefontaine Cemetery
- Party: Republican

Military service
- Allegiance: United States
- Branch/service: United States Army; Union Army
- Years of service: 1862–1864
- Rank: Colonel; Bvt. Brigadier General
- Commands: 31st Missouri Infantry; 47th Missouri Infantry; 50th Missouri infantry
- Battles/wars: American Civil War (POW): Battle of Chickasaw Bayou; Third Battle of Chattanooga; Battle of Fort Davidson

Thomas Clement Fletcher (January 21, 1827 – March 25, 1899) was the 18th governor of Missouri during the latter stages of the American Civil War and the early part of Reconstruction. He was the first Missouri governor to be born in the state. The Thomas C. Fletcher House was listed on the National Register of Historic Places in 1974.

== Early life and career ==
Fletcher was born in Herculaneum, Missouri. His parents had immigrated to Missouri from Maryland in 1818. He received a public school education and was elected circuit clerk in Jefferson County, Missouri, from 1849 until 1856. He was admitted to the bar in 1857.

Fletcher became a land agent for the southwest branch of the Pacific Railroad (which later became the St. Louis and San Francisco Railway) whereupon he moved to St. Louis. Although he had been raised as a Democrat in a slave-owning family, he had been an ardent abolitionist since his boyhood and became a Republican after 1856.

== Civil War ==
Fletcher was a delegate to the 1860 Republican National Convention in Chicago, where he supported the nomination of Abraham Lincoln. During the Civil War, he was Colonel of the 31st Missouri Volunteer Infantry in the Union army from 1862 until 1864, when he became Colonel of the 47th Missouri Volunteer Infantry. In 1862 he was captured at the Battle of Chickasaw Bayou and taken to Libby Prison, and then exchanged in May 1863. He was present at the fall of Vicksburg and the Battle of Chattanooga, and commanded a brigade in the Atlanta campaign.

Returning home because of illness in the spring of 1864, Fletcher recovered in time to organize the 47th and 50th Missouri infantry regiments and to command a regiment at the Battle of Pilot Knob, Missouri, where General Sterling Price's advance on St. Louis was stalled. For this service, he was brevetted brigadier general of volunteers.

After the war, he became a companion of the Missouri Commandery of the Military Order of the Loyal Legion of the United States.

== Political career ==
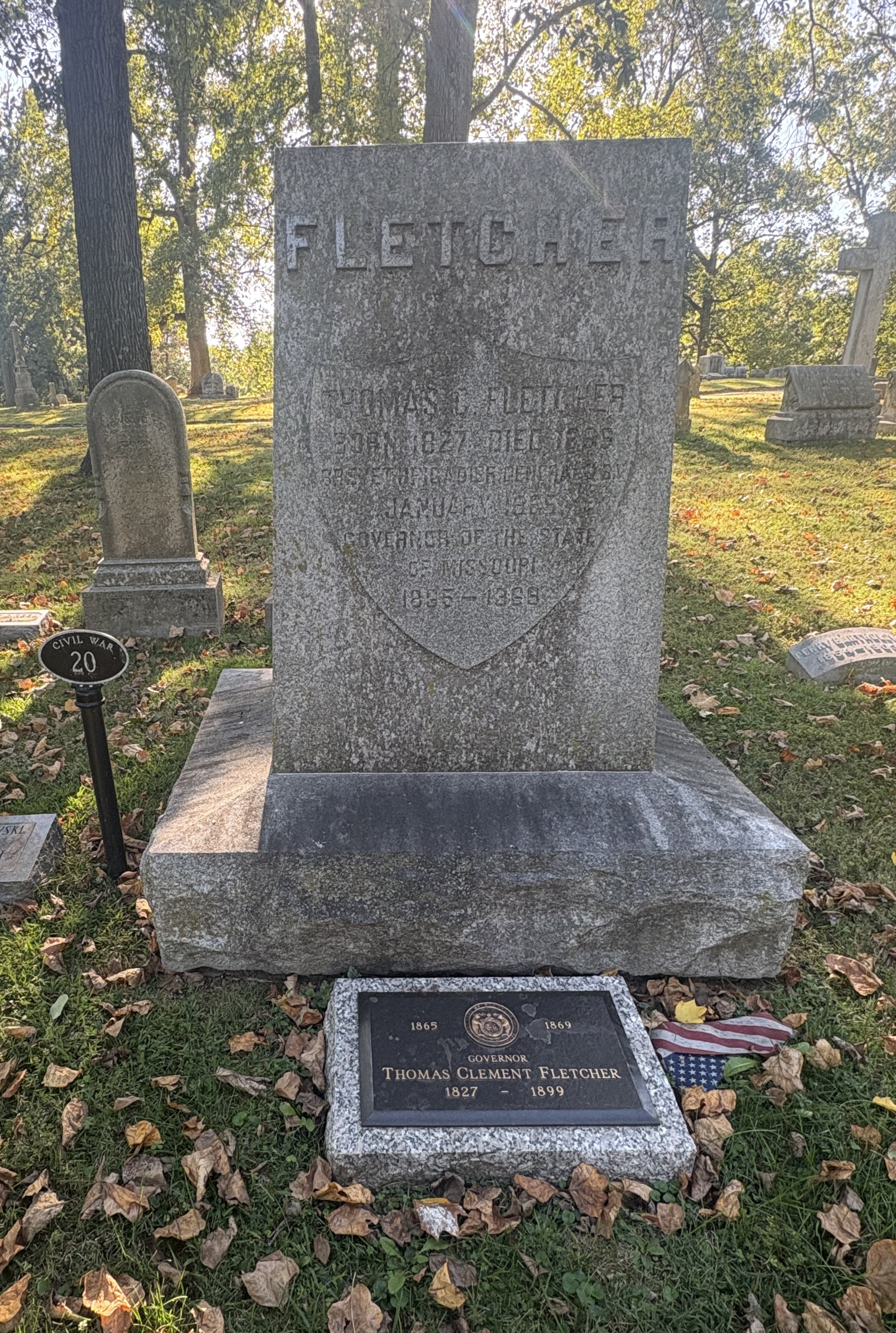
Fletcher's grave at Bellefontaine Cemetery

Fletcher was nominated for governor of Missouri by the National Union Party and elected in 1864. He served from 1865 to 1869, and on January 11, 1865, issued a "Proclamation of Freedom," adding his own imprimatur to the ordinance passed the same day by the state constitutional convention, abolishing slavery in Missouri. His administration was confronted with many problems, including amnesty for former Confederate soldiers, the disposition of the railroad property the state had acquired through default by the railroad companies failure to pay interest on bonds guaranteed by the state, and the reorganization of public education. The railroad property was sold under a guarantee of early completion and the state debt materially reduced. The public-school system was thoroughly reorganized and progress was made toward free education for all children.

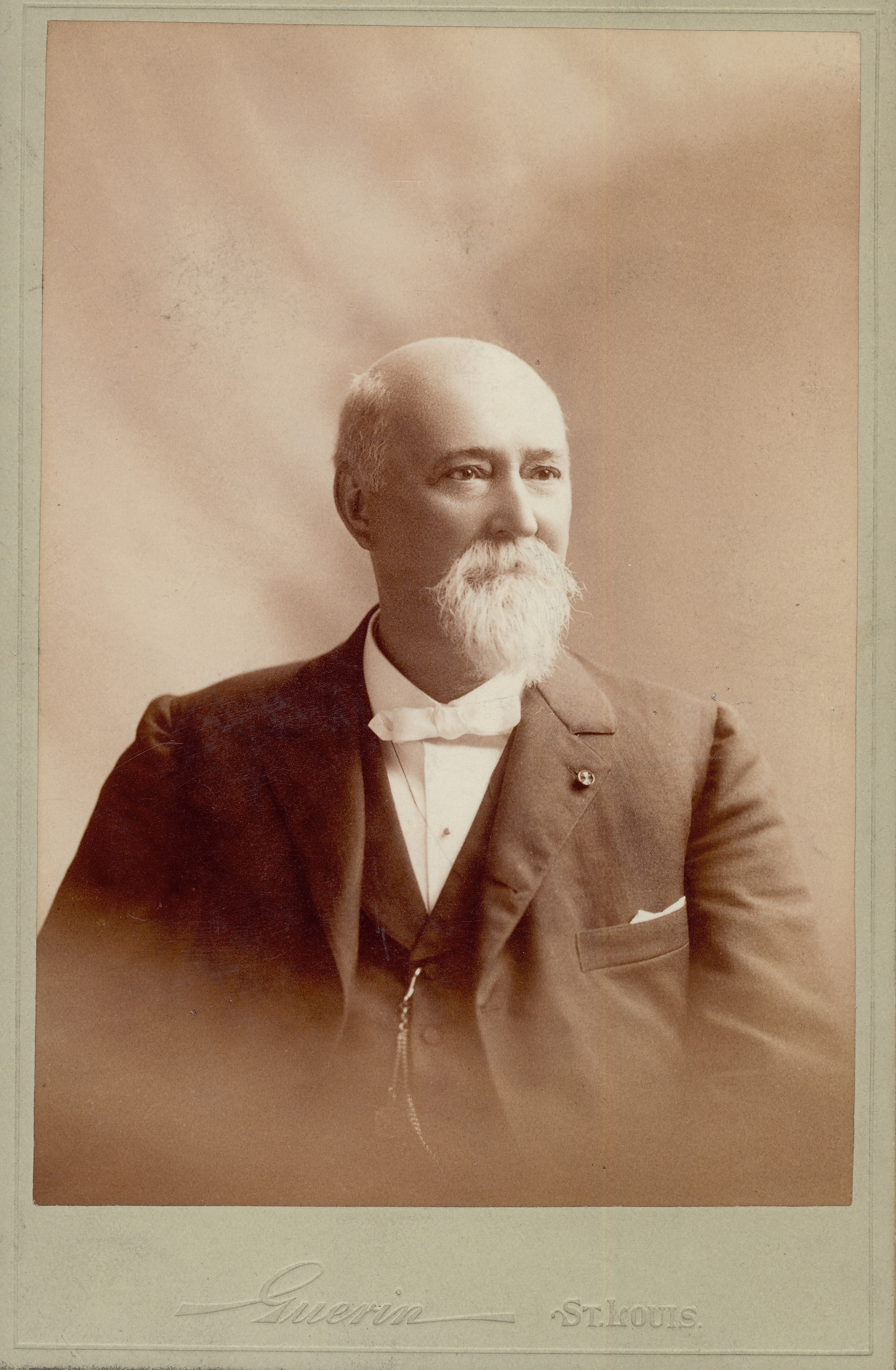
Fletcher in the 1890s

He was unsuccessful, however, in his repeated efforts to obtain a constitutional amendment abolishing the test oath as a qualification for voting and for engaging in the professions. He supported normal schools for training teachers, greater funding for the state university, and special attention to agricultural education.

After serving as governor, Fletcher returned to St. Louis and practiced law for a time. He then moved to Washington, D.C., where he continued to practice until his death. He wrote Life and Reminiscences of General Wm. T. Sherman (1891).

He died in Washington on March 25, 1899, was buried in Bellefontaine Cemetery in St. Louis.

Fletcher, Missouri, is named after him, as was the U.S. Army's Fort Fletcher in Kansas.

== See also ==
- History of slavery in Missouri

Party political offices
Preceded by James B. Gardenhire	Republican nominee for Governor of Missouri; 1864	Succeeded by Joseph W. McClurg
Political offices
Preceded by Willard Preble Hall	Governor of Missouri; January 2, 1865 – January 12, 1869	Succeeded by Joseph W. McClurg
