= Samuel H. Woodson (Kentucky politician) =

American politician and lawyer (1777–1827)

Member of the Kentucky House of Representatives
- In office 1825–1826

Member of the U.S. House of Representatives from Kentucky's 2nd district
- In office March 4, 1821 – March 3, 1823
- Preceded by: Henry Clay
- Succeeded by: Thomas Metcalfe

Clerk of the Jessamine County Circuit Court
- In office 1803–1819

Personal details
- Born: Samuel Hughes Woodson; September 15, 1777 near Charlottesville, Virginia, U.S.
- Died: July 28, 1827 (aged 49) Jessamine County, Kentucky, U.S.
- Resting place: Crocket Burying Ground
- Children: Samuel H. Woodson
- Profession: Politician, lawyer

Samuel Hughes Woodson (September 15, 1777 – July 28, 1827) was an American politician who served as a U.S. representative from Kentucky. He was the father of Samuel Hughes Woodson, who served as a U.S. representative from Missouri.

Born near Charlottesville, Virginia, Woodson completed preparatory studies. He studied law and was admitted to the bar in 1802 and commenced practice in Nicholasville, Kentucky. He served as clerk of Jessamine County Circuit Court 1803–1819.

Woodson was elected to the 17th Congress (March 4, 1821 – March 3, 1823). He was an unsuccessful candidate for reelection in 1822 to the 18th Congress. He resumed the practice of his profession in Nicholasville. He served as member of the State house of representatives in 1825 and 1826.

Woodson owned slaves.

He died at "Chaumiere," Jessamine County, Kentucky, July 28, 1827. He was interred in the Crocket Burying Ground.

U.S. House of Representatives
Preceded by Henry Clay	Member of the U.S. House of Representatives from Kentucky's 2nd congressional district 1821–1823	Succeeded by Thomas Metcalfe
