= 47th Missouri Infantry Regiment =

- Active: August 1864 to March 1865
- Country: United States of America
- Allegiance: Union Army
- Branch: Army
- Type: Infantry
- Engagements: Battle of Pilot Knob

Commanders
- Colonel of the Regiment: Thomas C. Fletcher

The 47th Missouri Infantry Regiment was an infantry regiment that served in the Union Army during the American Civil War.

== Service ==
The 47th Missouri Infantry Regiment was recruited in Missouri and organized in August and September 1864. It was attached to the District of St. Louis until December 1864. On September 19, 1864, a detachment of the regiment along with soldiers from the 3rd Missouri State Militia Cavalry Regiment (Union) under the command of First Lieutenant Erich Pape, captured the town of Doniphan, Missouri, and burned most of it, including the court house, to the ground. This was allegedly done in retaliation for pro-Confederate guerrilla activity in Ripley County. The Union horse soldiers then retreated, burning farm houses and barns as they went. Confederate cavalry under Gen. Joseph Shelby caught up with them the next morning at Ponder's Mill, in Butler County and killed four, wounded four and captured six. Shelby's men suffered two dead and five wounded.

Elements of the regiment participated in the Battle of Pilot Knob and in delaying maneuvers before St. Louis during Price's Missouri Raid. Other elements guarded important railroad locations and bridgeheads. In December 1864, the regiment was transferred to Nashville, Tennessee. The regiment also performed guard duty at Spring Hill, Columbia, and Pulaski, Tennessee through March 1865. The regiment was mustered out on March 28–30 of that same year.

During the course of its service, the regiment lost 10 men killed and mortally wounded, and 83 men by disease, for a total loss of 93.

== Sources ==
Dyer, Frederick H. (c.1908). A Compendium of the War of the Rebellion, V.III, p. 1338 (public domain).
