= James S. Rollins (20th-century politician) =

American politician (1887–1972)

James Sidney Rollins

Member of the Missouri Senate from the 10th district
- In office elected 1930 – ?

Personal details
- Born: James Sidney Rollins; May 4, 1887 Columbia, Missouri, US
- Died: April 1, 1972 (aged 84) Columbia, Missouri, US
- Party: Democratic
- Spouse: Sarah Vivion
- Relations: James S. Rollins, grandfather
- Children: James Sidney Rollins III
- Education: University of Missouri
- Occupation: Politician, assistant prosecuting attorney, businessman

James Sidney Rollins (May 4, 1887 – April 1, 1972) was an American politician from Columbia, Missouri who served in the Missouri Senate and the Missouri House of Representatives. He served in the military along the Mexican border and during World War I. Rollins was a member of the Missouri House of Representatives from 1921 until 1929 and was assistant prosecuting attorney for Boone County, Missouri, from 1912 until 1916. He was educated in public school and at the University of Missouri.

== Similarly named relations ==
His grandfather was also named James Sidney Rollins (1812–1888), a Civil War era congressman known for helping pass the Thirteenth Amendment abolishing slavery and for drafting the legislation establishing the University of Missouri, giving him the nickname "Father of the University of Missouri". Senator James Sidney Rollins (1887–1972) also had a son named James Sidney Rollins (1924–1994).
