= 1876 Missouri gubernatorial election =

- November 7, 1876
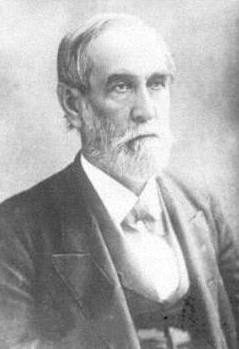

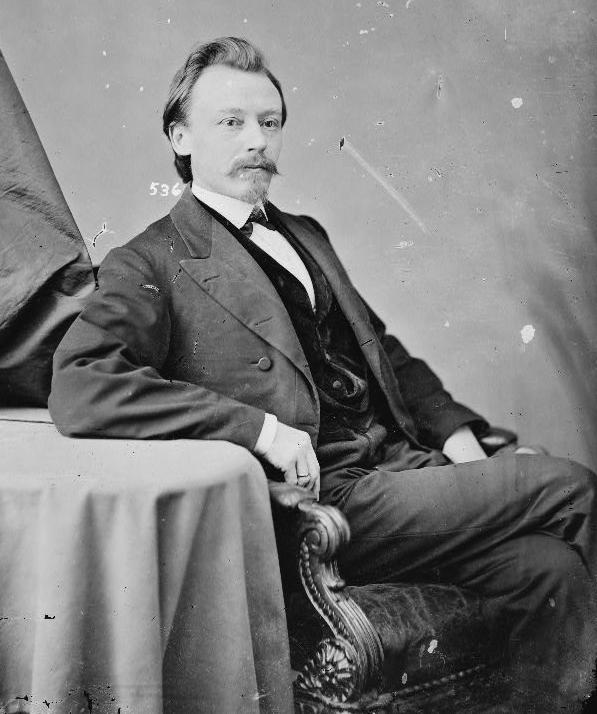
| Nominee | John S. Phelps | Gustavus A. Finkelnburg |
| Party | Democratic | Republican |
| Popular vote | 199,583 | 147,684 |
| Percentage | 56.99% | 42.17% |
- County results Phelps: 40–50% 50–60% 60–70% 70–80% 80–90% 90–100% Finkelnburg: 40–50% 50–60% 60–70% 70–80%
Governor before election
Charles Henry Hardin
Democratic
Elected Governor
John S. Phelps
Democratic

The 1876 Missouri gubernatorial election was held on November 7, 1876, and resulted in a victory for the Democratic nominee, former Congressman (and 1868 gubernatorial nominee) John S. Phelps, over the Republican candidate, former Congressman Gustavus A. Finkelnburg, and Greenback nominee J. P. Alexander.

== Results ==
1876 gubernatorial election, Missouri
| Party | Candidate | Votes | % | ±% |
|---|---|---|---|---|
| Democratic | John S. Phelps | 199,583 | 56.99 | −0.17 |
| Republican | Gustavus A. Finkelnburg | 147,684 | 42.17 | −0.67 |
| Greenback | J. P. Alexander | 2,962 | 0.85 | +0.85 |
| Majority | | 51,899 | 14.82 | +0.50 |
| Turnout | | 350,229 | 20.35 | |
| Democratic hold | | Swing | | |
