= Samuel H. Woodson (Missouri politician) =

American politician

Samuel Hughes Woodson
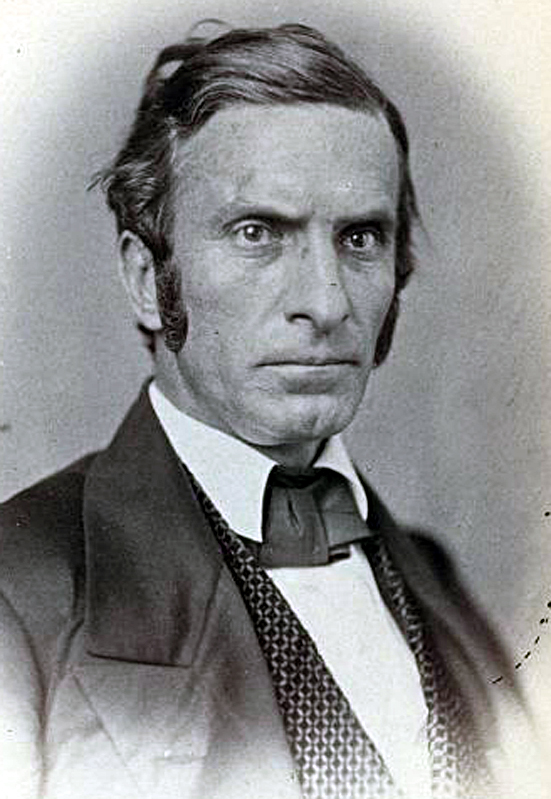

Member of the U.S. House of Representatives from Missouri's 5th district
- In office March 4, 1857 – March 3, 1861
- Preceded by: Thomas Peter Akers
- Succeeded by: John William Reid

Samuel Hughes Woodson (October 24, 1815 – June 23, 1881) was an American politician and slave owner who was a U.S. representative from Missouri.

Woodson was son of Samuel Hughes Woodson (1777–1827). He was born near Nicholasville, Kentucky and attended public schools. He graduated from Centre College, Danville, Kentucky, and the law department of Transylvania University, Lexington, Kentucky. He was admitted to the bar in 1838 and commenced the practice of law in Independence, Missouri, in 1840.

Woodson served as member of the Missouri House of Representatives in 1853 and 1854. He served as delegate to the State constitutional convention in 1855. He was elected on the American Party ticket to the Thirty-fifth and Thirty-sixth Congresses (March 4, 1857 – March 3, 1861).

He was not a candidate for renomination in 1860. He resumed the practice of his profession in Independence. He became affiliated with the Democratic Party. He was judge of the twenty-fourth judicial circuit of Missouri from March 1875 until his death in Independence, Missouri, June 23, 1881. He was interred in Woodlawn Cemetery.

U.S. House of Representatives
Preceded by Thomas P. Akers	Member of the U.S. House of Representatives from Missouri's 5th congressional district 1857-1861	Succeeded by John W. Reid
