= James S. Rollins =

American politician (1812–1888)

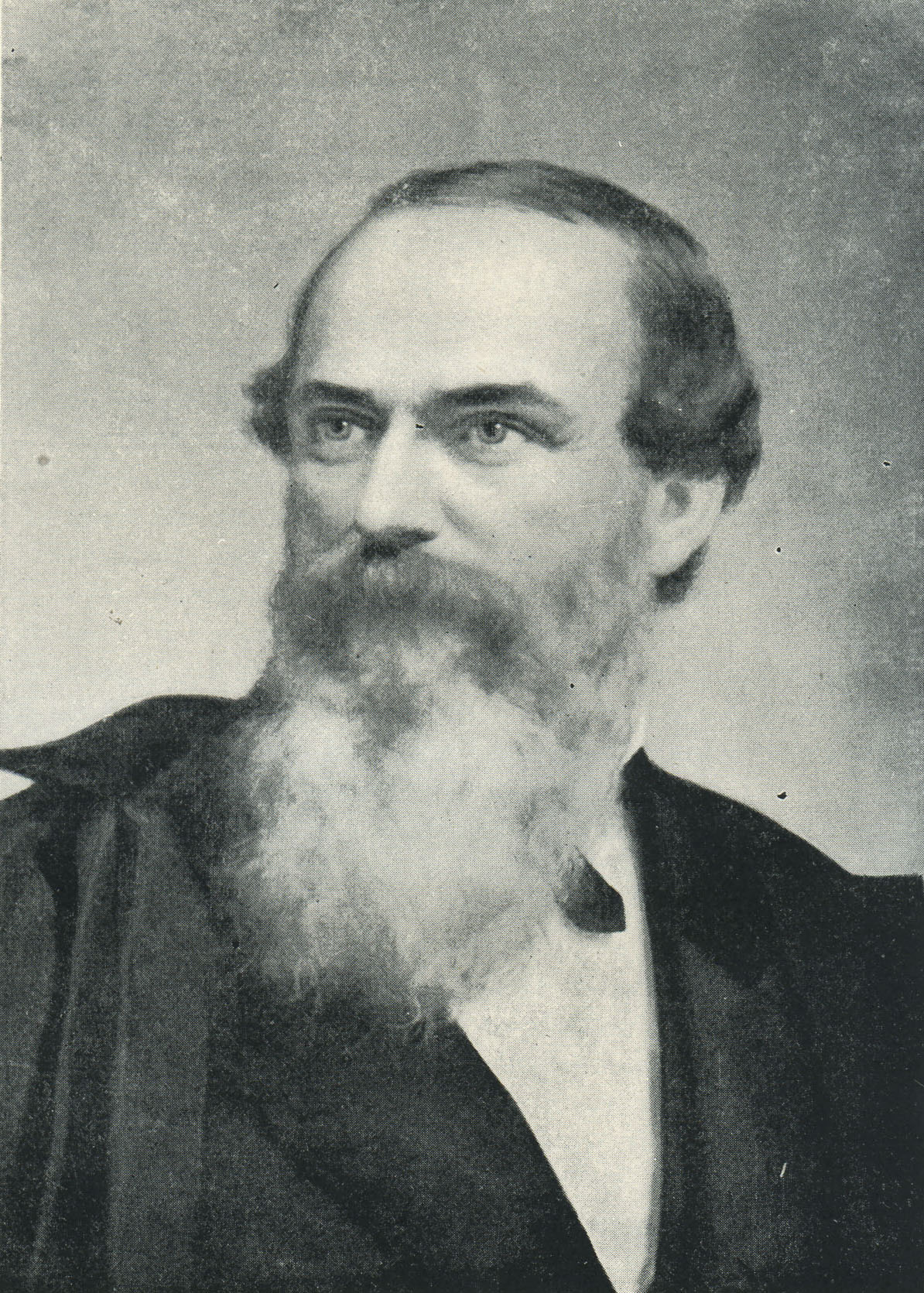

Member of the U.S. House of Representatives from Missouri
- In office March 4, 1861 – March 3, 1865
- Preceded by: Thomas L. Anderson
- Succeeded by: George W. Anderson
- Constituency: 2nd district (1861–63); 9th district (1863–65)

Member of the Missouri Legislature
- In office 1838; 1840; 1854

Personal details
- Born: April 19, 1812 Richmond, Kentucky
- Died: January 9, 1888 (aged 75) Columbia, Missouri
- Party: Whig (1836–1855); Know-Nothing 1855–1860; Constitutional Union (1860–1862); Conservative Union (1862–1864); Democratic (1864–1878); Republican (after 1878)
- Spouse: Mary Elizabeth Rollins

James Sidney Rollins (April 19, 1812 – January 9, 1888) was a 19th-century Missouri politician and lawyer. He helped establish the University of Missouri at Columbia, and led the successful effort to get it located in Boone County, and gained funding for the proposed state university with the passage of a series of legislative acts in the General Assembly of Missouri (state legislature) at the Missouri State Capitol in the state capital town of Jefferson City. For his efforts, he was named "Father of the University of Missouri".

As a border state United States Representative (Congressman), in the lower chamber of the United States House of Representatives, with member Rollins played a role in the Congress of the United States's passage and ratification of the Thirteenth Amendment to the Constitution of the United States, abolishing slavery in 1865. He changed his vote to support the proposed constitutional amendment, and spoke in favor of it on the floor of the House Chamber at the United States Capitol in Washington, D.C.. Representative Rollins was a member of the old Whig Party in the 1830s and 1840s for the first 20 years of his political career. When that divided political party broke up in the beginning of the 1850s, he began a political transition, changing parties and affiliations several times before eventually settling to becoming a Republican late in his life. Rollins' lifelong support of capitalism and business development was compatible with initial Republican economic policies, but his situation as a major slaveowner prevented him from joining the Republican Party until well after the American Civil War (1861–1865).

== Early years and family ==
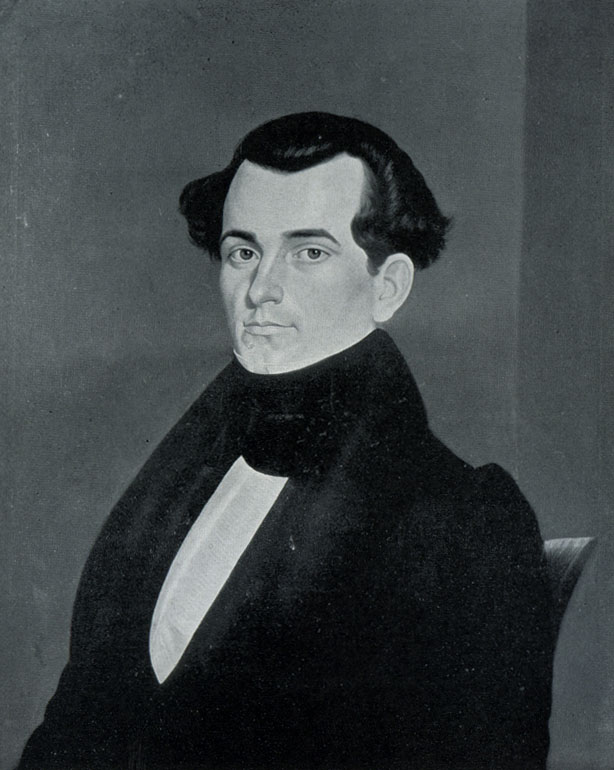
Portrait / painting of James S. Rollins (1812–1888), at age 22, three years before his marriage to Mary Elizabeth Hickman (1820–1907), c.1834, by noted Missouri artist George Caleb Bingham (1811–1879)

Rollins was born in Richmond, (Madison County) of Kentucky.

His father, Anthony Wayne Rollins, a physician, was born further east in Pennsylvania of Scotch-Irish immigrant parents, and named for the famous American Revolutionary War / Continental Army and later the new United States Army military officer, battle hero and General Anthony ("Mad Anthony") Wayne (1745–1796).

His mother, Sarah Harris Rodes Rollins, was born in Virginia and was of English descent.

Rollins studied at the Richmond Academy, in Richmond, Kentucky, attended the Washington College (now known as Washington and Jefferson College) in Washington, Pennsylvania, in the southwest corner of the Commonwealth, and later graduated from what is now the Indiana University Bloomington, further west in Bloomington, Indiana, in 1830. The Rollins family moved from Kentucky further west to Boone County, Missouri that same year. Rollins read law in the local Columbia law offices of Abiel Leonard (later appointed a Missouri state supreme court justice) for two years, while helping to manage his father's farm. During April–August 1832, Rollins enlisted in the short Black Hawk War on the frontier against the local remaining native / Indian tribes and was given the rank of Major in the volunteer militia. After that brief interlude of warfare, Rollins entered law school at the Transylvania University, (the first and oldest institution of higher education, west of the Appalachian Mountains chain), in Lexington, Kentucky. When he graduated from there in 1834, he was admitted to the Missouri bar, and began practicing in Columbia that same year.

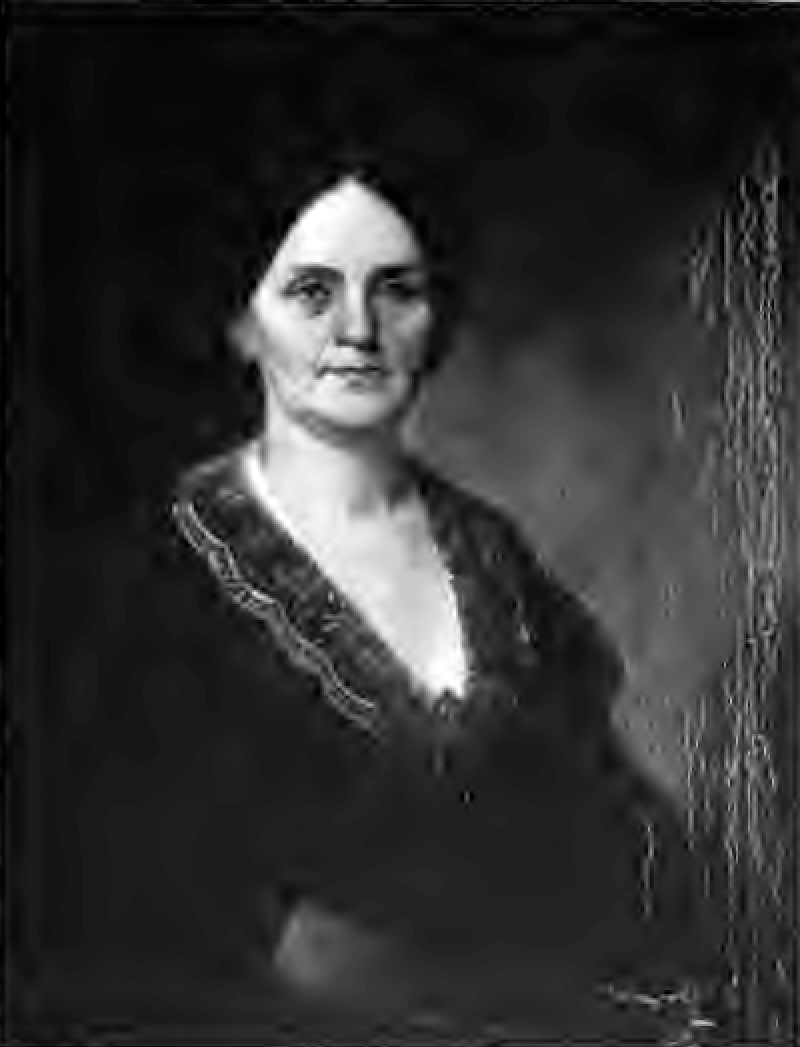
Mary Elizabeth Hickman Rollins (1820–1907), wife since 1837 of James S. Rollins (1812–1888)

In 1837, Rollins married Mary Elizabeth Hickman (1820–1907). She was the daughter of James Hickman, and was originally from Franklin, in nearby Howard County, of Missouri. They had 11 children, seven of whom survived to adulthood.

== Early political career ==
Rollins began his political career as a Whig. His politics reflected his interest in business and resource development. In 1836, he purchased a Whig newspaper, the Columbia Patriot, which he edited for several years. That same year, he attended a railroad convention in St. Louis, where he was chosen to petition Congress for Missouri railroad land grants.

=== Missouri state legislator ===
Rollins was elected to the General Assembly of Missouri (state legislature) in 1838, representing Boone County. He was elected to the bicameral Assembly's lower chamber of the Missouri House of Representatives serving as a state Representative in 1838, reelected in 1840, and for another term in 1854, and also as a state Senator in the upper chamber of the Missouri Senate in 1846. He was a delegate to the 1844 Whig National Convention in Baltimore to nominate a presidential candidate in the U.S. presidential / congressional elections that year. Four years later, he ran for the office of Governor of Missouri in state general elections of 1848 and again a decade later in 1857, but was defeated both times. Rollins was a Whig from 1836 to 1855, when the party dissolved and split in dissension over the recent Congressional legislation of the Kansas-Nebraska Act regarding the extension of slavery into the western federal territories and in creating new states. As a large slaveholder himself in Missouri, Rollins was not an abolitionist, but he opposed both the further westward extension of slavery and secession of states from the Federal Union, with its political doctrine of States' rights.

When the Whig Party ended, Rollins began a political transition. He ran as an independent in his 1857 second try for Missouri governor, supported by the extremist third party of the Know-Nothings, (a.k.a. the Native American Party or later, the American Party), Thomas Hart Benton (1782–1858), (Missouri's respected influential U.S. Senator), the Democrats, and remnants of the former Whigs. He lost again in his second contest for the governorship to Democrat Robert M. Stewart (1815–1871), by only 334 votes. When he was not serving in the Missouri General Assembly state legislature, Rollins developed his law practice at home in Columbia, despite ambivalence about the monotony of a legal career amid the swirling storms around him of an American political maelstrom, centered on the divided Border States like Missouri, Kentucky and further east in Maryland and Delaware, and a strong sense of an impending doom.

=== Establishment of the University of Missouri ===
The first bill that Rollins drafted as a State Representative was to locate the University of Missouri. The bill directed that the university be located in one of six counties in the central part of the state along the Missouri River: Boone Callaway, Cole, Cooper, Howard, and Saline Counties. Cole and Howard Counties legislators had hoped to secure the university campus for their jurisdictions by direct legislation, but Rollins' bill passed in the two chambers of the Assembly on February 8, 1839. Three days later, the Geyer Act, introduced by Henry S. Geyer (1790–1859), of St. Louis, also passed, officially incorporating the University of Missouri.

Rollins' act directed that the county that raised the most money would be awarded the university. Rollins himself made a significant donation, and put considerable effort into raising subscriptions from fellow Boone County residents. The competition was most intense among Boone, Callaway, and Howard Counties. When state commissioners visited Howard County, Rollins was there. After learning that Howard County had increased the appraised value of land donated in the competition, Rollins sold 222 acres (0.90 km^{2}) of his own land to Boone County for $25 an acre. Boone County in turn appraised the land at $75 an acre in its bid. The $117,921 raised by Boone County was the highest amount, and won the university.

Rollins' efforts to support the University of Missouri met with limited success before the Civil War. As Senator, he drafted a report in 1847 which proposed state funding for the school and a professorship for advanced studies in "Theory and Practice of Teaching". The Senate passed a version two years later, providing no funding and only a "Normal Professorship".

== U.S. Representative ==
Rollins was elected to the U.S.House of Representatives, the lower chamber of the Congress of the United States in the crucial pivotal 1860 general elections, as a member of the small minority party as a Constitutional Unionist. He defeated Independent Democrat John B. Henderson for the House seat. Rollins was reelected during the subsequent Civil War again in 1862, this time as a Conservative Unionist, defeating another minority splinter candidate of Emancipationist Arnold Krekel.

During the American Civil War (1861–1865), Representative Rollins remained a Unionist, and voted for most war measures introduced by the Lincoln presidential administration in Congress. But his stance on slavery and African-American / former slaves' rights were more conservative than those of the now dominant new Republican Party in the North. He opposed a measure allowing blacks and Indians to enlist in the Union Army and participate in the war and further the fight for their freedom, on his opinion that the basis to allow this change in war policy would offend Southerners and still loyal Border States citizens. He also stated that the Emancipation Proclamation of September 1862, enacted January 1863, was legally void, and only defensible as a military necessity.

In the Congress, Rollins joined with many others to introduce and support a bill to build and extend a transcontinental railroad, passed as the Pacific Railway Acts of 1862, and signed by President Lincoln. He also advocated the Morrill Act of 1862, providing additional federal funding for state agricultural colleges and universities.

Rollins' support of the Thirteenth Amendment to the Constitution, which abolished slavery, played a key part in its passage by both houses of Congress, sending the amendment to the individual states for ratification. The upper house of the United States Senate passed the bill easily on its first vote on April 8, 1864, but the lower House of Representatives defeated it twice in 1864 before finally passing it after additional new members were elected in the November 1864 presidential/congressional general elections, two months later on January 31, 1865. Congressman Rollins initially voted against the bill. Shortly before the third vote, 16th President Abraham Lincoln personally met with and asked Rollins to support the amendment, as necessary to preserve the Union and a better future. Rollins finally agreed to do so. On January 13, 1865, two days after the Missouri Constitutional Convention abolished slavery there, Rep. Rollins spoke for the first time for the amendment, in a lengthy and persuasive speech in the United States Capitol on the House floor aimed at members of both parties and houses of Congress. With formerly fence-sitter Rollins' support, the constitutional amendment passed with the required two-thirds majority with just two votes to spare.

Rollins witnessed the unfortunate tragic Centralia Massacre in Centralia, Missouri on September 27, 1864.

== Later political career ==
Rollins did not run for Congress in 1864, but returned to Columbia. In that year's presidential election, he endorsed the Democratic Party candidate, George B. McClellan. This signaled his preference for the party's conservative stance on slavery and African-American equality, and recognized its shift from secessionism. In 1866, he was elected as a Democrat to the Missouri House of Representatives, and in 1868 to the upper chamber of the State Senate. There, Senator Rollins supported President Andrew Johnson's mild Reconstruction policies, but did not strongly denounce Radical Republican efforts to develop more stringent policies, so as not to harm budget funding prospects for the University of Missouri.

Rollins' support of business aligned with most Republican policies, but his opposition to racial equality kept him from joining that party until after Reconstruction and Republicans stopped pushing for this. Now out of office, he now broke with the Democrats in 1878 over their continued support of the printing, issuing and circulating paper currency by the U.S. Treasury Department, (besides longtime minting gold and silver coins), which had been reintroduced into the wartime economy of the nicknamed federal greenbacks paper money of the 1860s. He finally became a Republican then and remained one for the rest of his life.

While a state legislator, Senator Rollins focused on his pet project of the University of Missouri. The state was not funding the institution at the level he thought proper. The Civil War left the now three-decades old state university in poor physical shape and with few students. The local fundraising in the original competition set a precedent for the Missouri General Assembly in Jefferson City to ignore later requests for money. As a result, the campus was small, rundown and shabby, the students came mainly from surrounding Boone County, and the place seemed more like a backwoods county public school than a thriving state university.

As a legislator after the war, Representative / Senator Rollins wrote, introduced, and helped pass several measures, through both chambers of the state General Assembly and signed by the Governor of Missouri, which together financially stabilized the University of Missouri for the first time in its three decades of history, and strengthened Columbia's hold on it:

- Appropriation of $10,000 for a new President's House, and additional $16,000 per year for general funding (1867).
- Establishment of a "Normal" school department (for teaching) – (to train public school teachers for lower grades of grammar / primary (elementary school) and upper middle school / high school faculty) (1867).
- Establishment of Agricultural and Mechanical College. Concessions to get the bill passed required Boone County to contribute money for the new college, and located the newly established Missouri School of Mines to Rolla, not in Columbia (1870).
- Investment of $122,000 from state sales of "seminary lands" for higher education, as authorized by the Federal Government (1870). This money was augmented with a similar act a decade later in 1883.
- Issue of $166,000 in bonds to build the new Missouri School of Mines at Rolla (later renamed the Missouri University of Science and Technology, as of a century and half later in 2008), liquidate University past debt, complete the Science Building (later renamed Switzler Hall, for journalist / publisher William Franklin Switzler, 1819–1906), as of 2008), and add to the university's permanent accumulated endowment (1872).
- Setting maximum university tuition at $10 per student per year, making college more easily affordable for most students (1872).

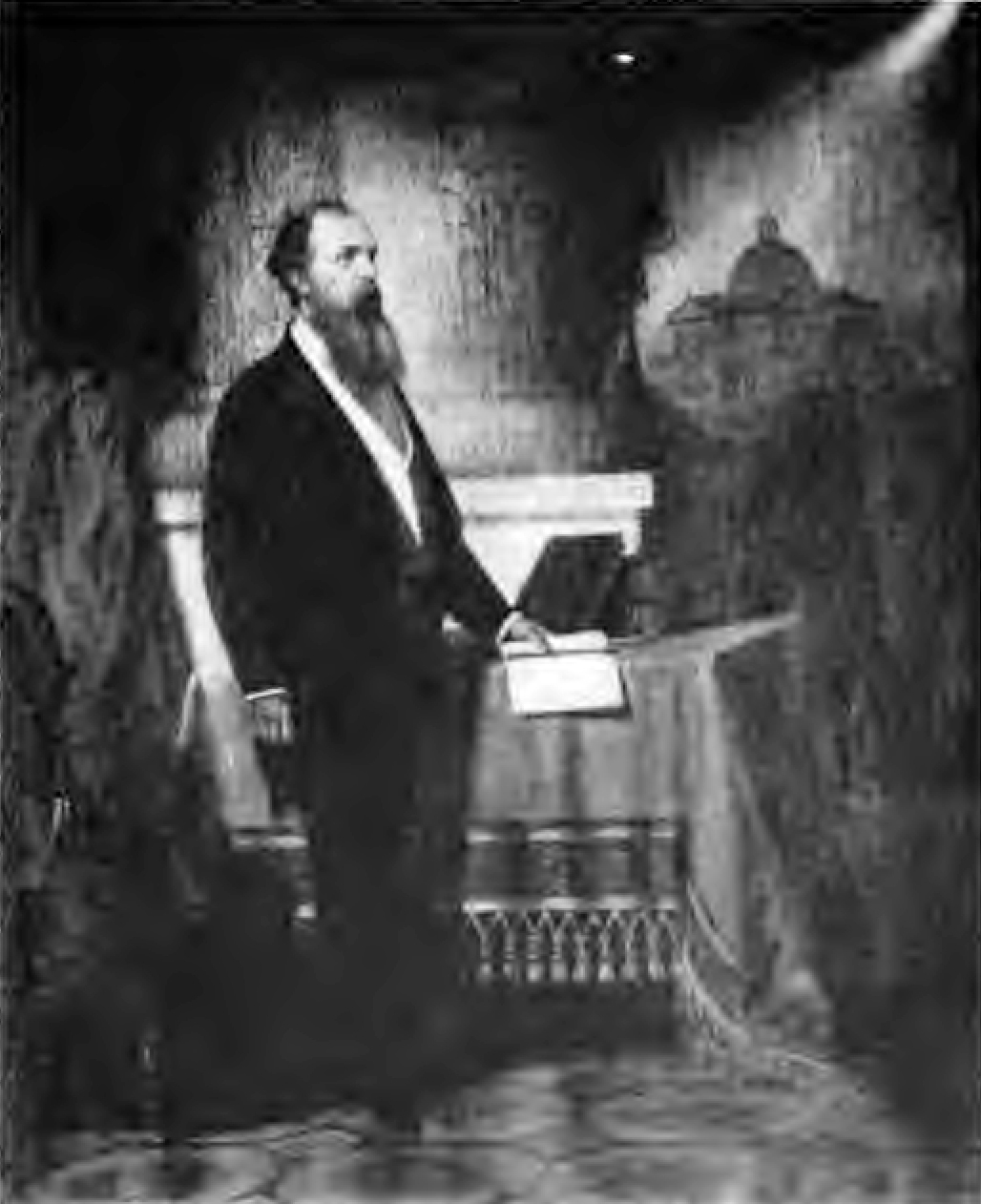
Mural painting of standing James S. Rollins (1812–1888), by Missouri artist George Caleb Bingham (1811–1879). The mural was originally located in the old Academic Hall, U.of M. main building (1843–1892, designed by architect Stephen Hills (1771–1844), who also did the old second Missouri State Capitol (1840–1911), in Jefferson City), on the University of Missouri at Columbia campus.

=== Father of the University of Missouri ===
When State Senator Rollins returned to Columbia after the 1872 legislative session at the Missouri State Capitol in Jefferson City, students assembled and adopted resolutions thanking him for his work on the university's behalf. The faculty issued a similar statement. The board of curators passed resolutions of similar affections, and on May 9, 1872, giving Rollins the honorary Latin title of "Pater Universitatis Missouriensis" ("Father of the University of Missouri").

== University of Missouri Board of Curators President ==
Rollins was first named to the University of Missouri Board of Curators, the university's governing body, in 1847. He held the position until 1848, when the State Legislature removed the entire board. He again joined the board in 1869, and was elected its President that same year. He held the position until ill health forced his resignation in 1886.

== Friendship with George Caleb Bingham ==
Among his many acquaintances, Rollins had a lifelong friendship with artist and politician George Caleb Bingham. Bingham painted numerous portraits of Rollins family members, including several of Rollins himself. Rollins gave Bingham a boost early in his career by getting several people in Columbia to have him paint their portraits. He later helped Bingham get a commission to do portraits of Thomas Jefferson and George Washington for the Missouri State Capitol, and he helped finance printings of Bingham's General Order No. 11. Late in Bingham's life, Rollins helped him get a position as the University of Missouri's first art professor.

Rollins and Bingham named sons after each other. Bingham frequently visited the Rollins home, sometimes staying for a month at a time. The two maintained a frequent correspondence for over forty-five years, until Bingham's death, in which they discussed a variety of personal, social, and political issues.

== Death ==
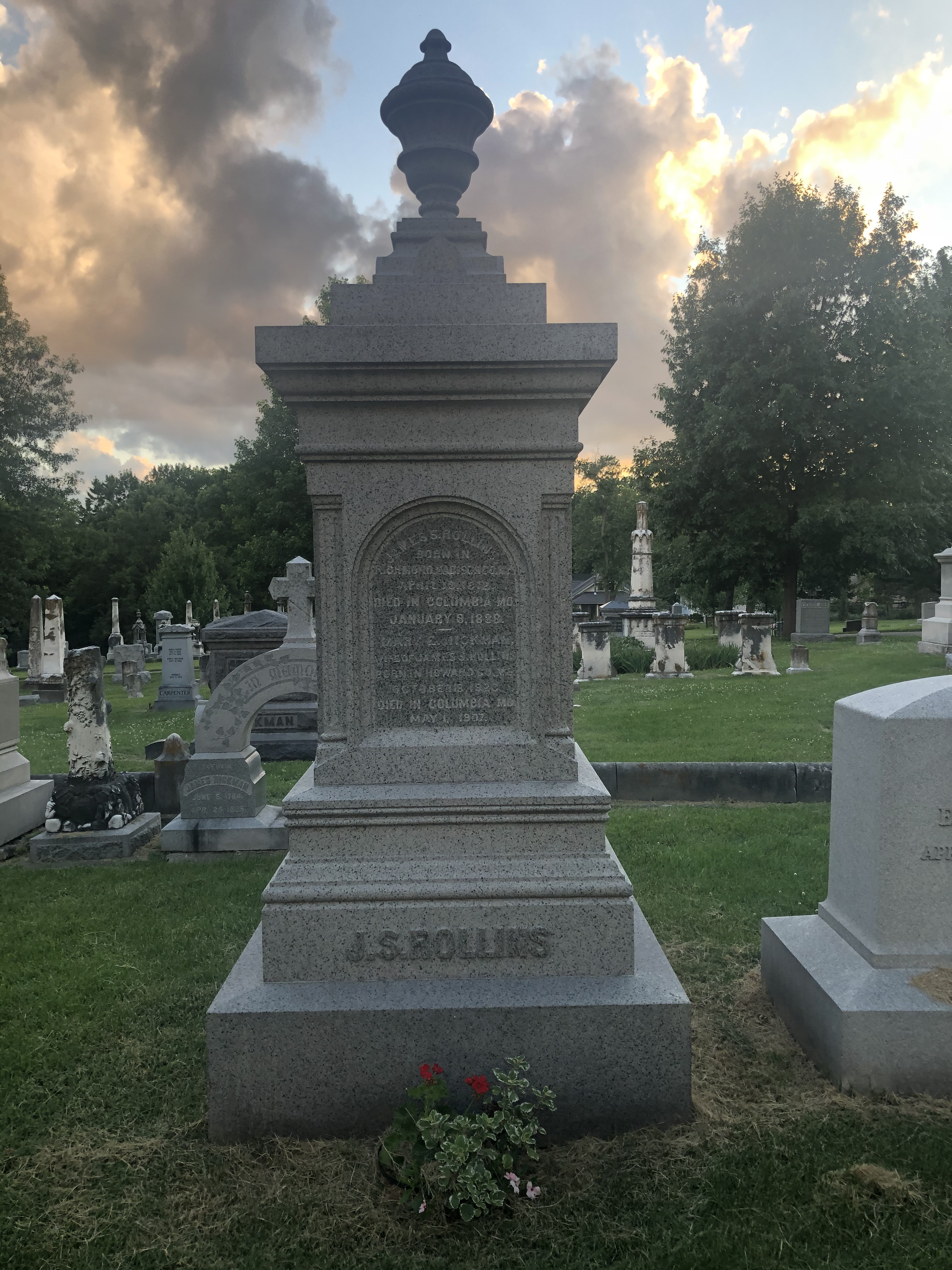
Gravesite of James Sydney Rollins (1812–1888), in the Rollins Family Plot, at Columbia Cemetery, in Columbia, (Boone County), Missouri, U.S.A.

In 1874, Rollins was injured in a train wreck while traveling eastbound to St. Louis. He was bedridden for several months, and although he recovered to live 14 more years, he never fully regained his strength. Rollins died at age 75 years of age, on January 9, 1888, at his home in Columbia, Missouri. He is buried there in the nearby Rollins Family Plot, at the Columbia Cemetery, in Columbia, (Boone County), Missouri, U.S.A. .

== See also ==
- James S. Rollins (20th-century politician)

== Notes ==
Party political offices
Preceded by Charles Allen	Whig nominee for Governor of Missouri; 1848	Succeeded by James Winston
Preceded by Robert Ewing	Know Nothing nominee for Governor of Missouri; 1857	Succeeded by None
U.S. House of Representatives
Preceded by Thomas L. Anderson	Member of the U.S. House of Representatives from Missouri's 2nd congressional district March 4, 1861 – March 3, 1863	Succeeded by Henry T. Blow
Preceded by (none)	Member of the U.S. House of Representatives from Missouri's 9th congressional district March 4, 1863 – March 3, 1865	Succeeded by George W. Anderson
