= Veiled Prophet Parade and Ball =

Annual parade and dance in St. Louis, Missouri

The Veiled Prophet Parade and Ball was a parade and debutante ball in St. Louis, Missouri presided over by a mythical figure called the Grand Oracle or Veiled Prophet. The first parade and ball were held in 1878, organized and funded by the Veiled Prophet Organization (VPO), an anonymous society founded in 1878 by all-white and male only civic leaders. Its Veiled Prophet ball became a nation-wide popular event. In 2022, after much attention to its racist origins, traditions and customs, VPO, now VP St. Louis, removed any mention of the Veiled Prophet in relation to the ball or itself.

== Introduction ==
With the United States' centennial celebrations in the rear view mirror, business owners continued to turn to carnivals and expositions as a way to boost growth and ensure their businesses' success in the latter part of the nineteenth century. The parade and ball were organized and funded by the Veiled Prophet Organization, an all-male, anonymous society founded in 1878 by prominent St. Louisans, a highly select group culled from the area's business, civic and governmental leaders. The organization chooses a member to be a Veiled Prophet who conducts meetings and oversees activities. Originally, the Veiled Prophet parade was a nighttime event.

St. Louis' Veiled Prophets had a short-lived competing krewe, the Mystic Order of Funny Fellows, which was replaced by the Earls of Electra.

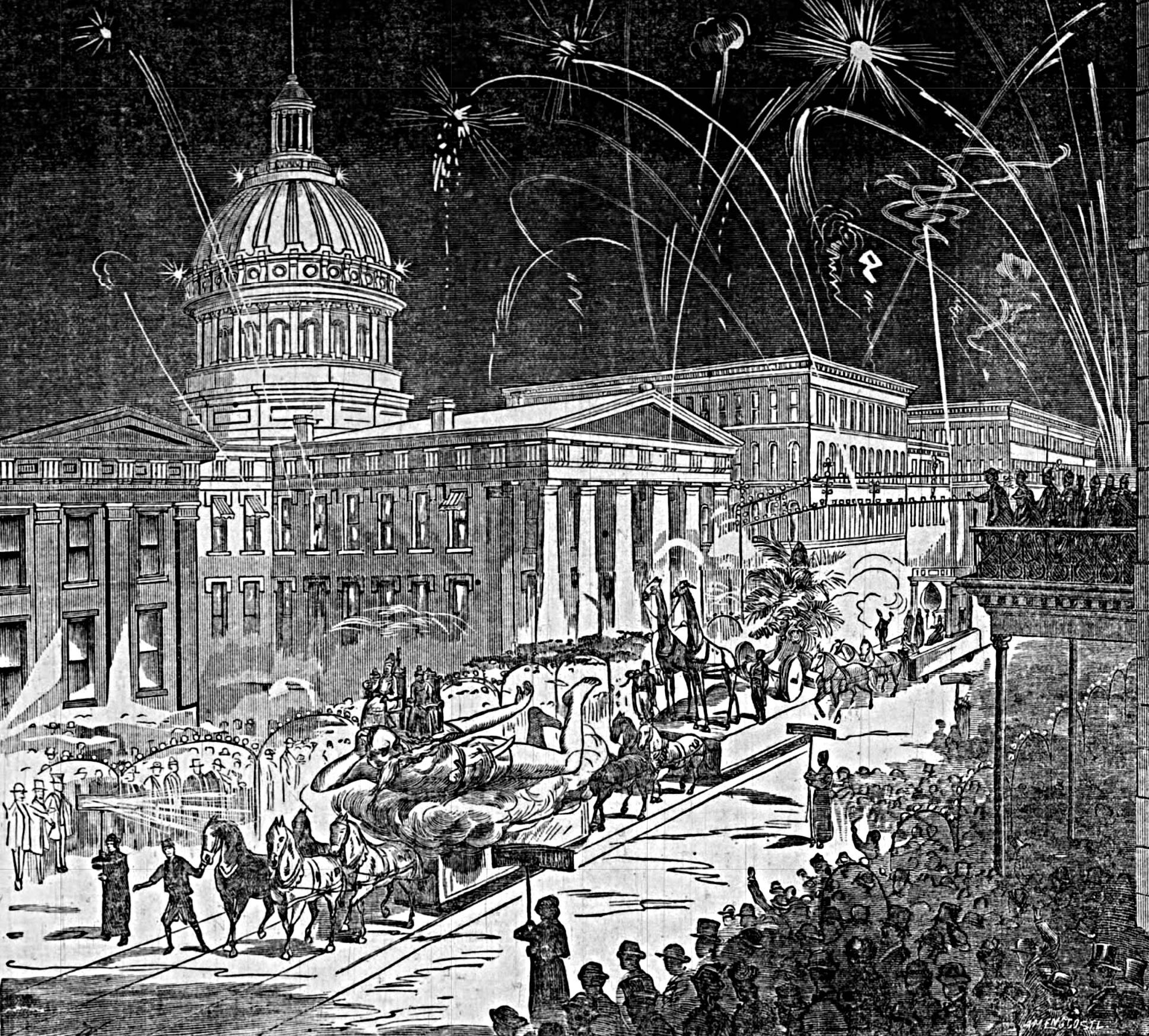
1885 Veiled Prophet Parade, with theme An Arabian Night The representation of the King of the Jinns, with an outstretched arm, first float, is bearing the Veiled Prophet and his attendants, beneath umbrellas. Second is "The Fairy of Poetry and Romance," with two giraffe representations, and, passing in front of the Old Courthouse (St. Louis) is a float with the theme "The Modern Story-Teller of the Orient". On the street, torchbearers carry lanterns.

Historian Thomas Spencer argues that the St. Louis elite founded the organization that would put on the parade for three reasons:

1. As a way for the elite to exert dominance and to "reclaim the streets of St. Louis from the working class" after the General Strike of 1877.
2. Boost St. Louis Agricultural and Mechanical Fair attendance and entice more farmers to sell their crops at said fair.
3. Create an exclusive organization to be utilized for business connections and to boost their influence.

The pomp and circumstance of the VP parade generally revealed rather than soothed class conflicts. However, the Veiled Prophet parade was not the only parade to occur during the fall fair. By 1886, the seven-week-long Grand Autumnal Festivities included nine separate parades. At times, it was referred to as "Veiled Prophet Week". Occasionally, unions would stage events intended to mock the pretensions of the VP Ball. The leading socialist and working-class newspaper, St. Louis Labor, "wrote negatively" about the VP event and its organizers between the early 1900s and 1930.

In 1878, the first ball was referred to as a bal masque but only the Veiled Prophets themselves could attend en masque. The Veiled Prophets would continue to attend the ball en masque for the first few years. Other venues hosted spin off balls for those that weren't invited to the actual VP ball. In 1894, after the St. Louis Autumnal Festival Association disbanded, they switched from having a Belle of the Ball to a Queen of Love and Beauty. At first, the parade and ball were held on the same night until 1924. From 1925 to 1949, the ball was held the night after the parade. In the ceremony, each Special Maid of Honor in the Queen's court is paired with a Veiled Prophet, in full veiled headdress. The Queen of Love and Beauty is paired with the Grand Oracle of the Veiled Prophets.

In 1967, the Queen and Special Maids were removed from the parade. The next year, the parade was moved from downtown to the Central West End. That was also the last year the Veiled Prophet parade occurred at night due to increasing animosity and protests. In 1969, the parade was shifted to daylight hours, also marking the first in which the Prophet did not appear in the parade.

In 1995, the name of the riverfront celebration was changed to Fair Saint Louis, though the street procession was still called Veiled Prophet Parade. The date was fixed for Independence Day. It continued to be funded by the Veiled Prophet Organization.

In 2003, the organization created a Community Service Initiative, through which members participate in a wide variety of projects in and around the city of St. Louis. In 2016, it secured a trademark for the name America's Birthday Parade.

More recently, the event was protested by Black Lives Matter supporters, as well as the St. Louis-based group Missourians Organizing for Reform and Empowerment, which linked St. Louis's wealthiest one percent to the VP organization.

In 2021, the "Veiled Prophet Parade" was replaced by the "American Birthday Parade". "

In early 2024, St. Louis Public Radio reported that the VP organization removed the Veiled Prophet figurehead in an effort to move away from its troubled history. At the December 2024 debutante ball, the main prophet figurehead was still there but referred to as the Grand Oracle. Instead of a veil, the GO had a golden mask and long beard. However, the main Veiled Prophet figure has been called the Grand Oracle within the organization since its inception.

Over the past nearly 150 years, it has been referred to as the Veiled Prophet(s), Order of the Veiled Prophets, the Veiled Prophet Order, Veiled Prophet organization, and more recently the Veiled Prophet Society, VP St. Louis etc. However, it should not be confused with the masonic Mystic Order of the Veiled Prophets of the Enchanted Realm. At times, it has been mistakenly considered the same organization.

== Founding of the Veiled Prophets ==
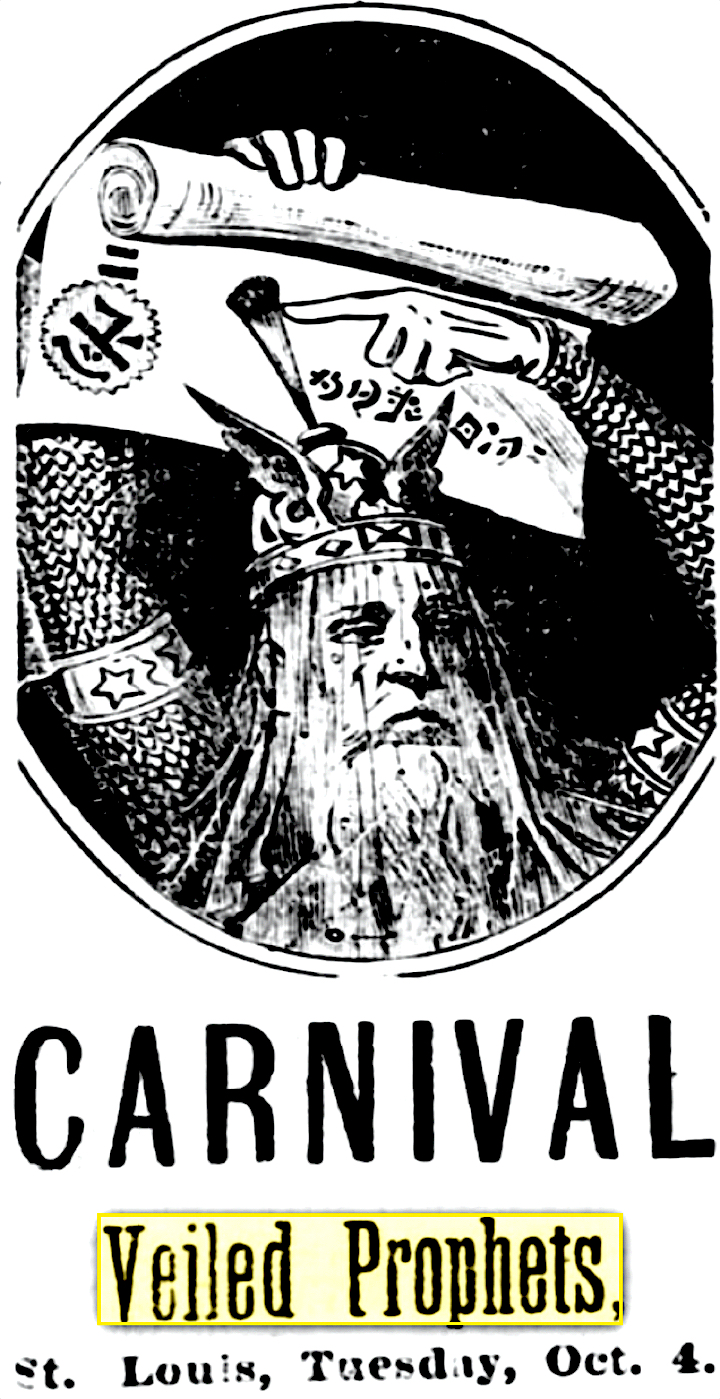
1881 advertisement

The organization had its roots in the St. Louis Agricultural and Mechanical Fair, an annual festival and exposition beginning in 1856. Featuring agricultural crops, mechanical innovations, arists, crafts, merchants, inventors and demonstrations, it grew to be an Exposition that was popular nation wide. Spencer wrote that city boosters devised the Veiled Prophet organization and parade in an attempt to reclaim the fading pre-eminence for St. Louis as a manufacturing center and agricultural shipping point from the rapidly growing city of Chicago. The first visit of the Prophet was thus in 1878, after the Great Panic of 1875, when business needed reviving and St. Louis needed development.

Similar Mardi Gras like organizations would continue to pop up in the decades after the Veiled Prophet's creation to boost their city's economical growth, however short lived they were. Some hosted balls as well. They include Omaha's Knights of Ak-Sar-Ben, Lincoln's Tartarrax Pageant, Kansas City's Priests of Pallas, Baltimore's Order of the Oriole, Des Moines' Seni Om Sed, Cincinnati's Order of Cincinnatus, and Louisville's Satellites of Mercury.

In a 1956 promotional book by Vincent H. Sanders and Theodore D. Drury Jr., the Prophet was a world traveler who chose to bless St. Louis; reporter Walter E. Orthwein of the Globe-Democrat wrote in 1958 that the VP was conceived as "a kind of Santa Claus for grownups."

=== Founding meeting ===
On March 20, 1878, Charles Slayback, a grain broker who had spent several years during Reconstruction in New Orleans and was a member of the Mystic Krewe of Comus, called a meeting of local business leaders at the Lindell Hotel. The letter was signed by John B. Maude, John A. Scudder, George Bain, John G. Priest, and David P. Rowland.

Dear sir:— You are cordially invited to attend a meeting of prominent gentlemen on the 20th inst. at 8 p. m., sharp, parlor 22, Lindell Hotel. The object is one that will promote the interests of St. Louis, and will be fully explained at the meeting. By presenting this invitation at the door it will admit you.

The first meeting's minutes were leaked to the press. Among those present besides the committee were Charles E. Slayback, George H. Morgan, Leigh O. Knapp, Henry Paschall, H. T. Kent, W. H. H. Russell, J. C. Normile, Dr. Preetorius, A. W. Slayback and others. George Bain said the purpose of the meeting was to decide what kind of event would kick off the Exposition that year. They thought a Mardi Gras like event may be better kick off to the Fair than the Trade Procession.

“Mr. Charles E. Slayback gave some interesting information as to how these affairs are conducted successfully in New Orleans, and said he had received offers from the Mystic Krewe of assistance, if desired, in the way of costumes and paraphernalia."

Charles Slayback, left,
and Alonzo Slayback, right

The first 14 members, later called The Originals, met a week later to establish rules and a hierarchy for their new organization. There was to be the Grand Oracle and two High Priests. The Originals were George Bain, Henry T. Kent, Leigh O. Knapp, John B. Maude, George Morgan, J.C. Normille, Henry Paschall, Emil Preetorius, John G. Priest, D. P. Roland, William H. H. Russel, John A. Scudder, Alonzo Slayback and Charles Slayback.

Alonzo Slayback and Col. J. C. Normile were on the committee in charge of naming the organization. The first mention of the Veiled Prophets appeared in newspapers in early July 1878. Charles used his Mystic Krewe connections to purchase twenty floats(which were worth approximately $20,000 then) for $8,000.

In the summer of 1878, about 200 members were initiated into the Veiled Prophet organization. Eligible members in part had to be a resident of St. Louis, at least 25 years old, of good character, and willing to assist with any project if asked. Spencer notes that out of the 73 identifiable founding members, six were foreign-born immigrants and one was Jewish.

In addition to the 14 originals, other founding members included Edward Adreon, Stephen Bemis, Rolla Billingsley, Shepard Barclay, Bill Belt, John Bonnet, Myron Buck, John Crangle, Gideon Chadbourne, Frank Capitan, John Carroll, George Capen, Daniel Catlin, Charles Chouteau, Pierre Chouteau, Jacob Ewald, John Davis, Wallace Delafield, Samuel Dodd, Charles Donaldson, John Finn, John Finney, E. T. Farish, Moses Fraley, Frank Gaiennie, Alexander Garesche, David Gould, Jacob Goldman, John Glikeson, John Grady, Edward Hoppe, William Hyer, Henry Haarstick, William Hargadine, John Homes, George A. Madil, David Nichelson, Acuter Jennings, John Kaiser, L. D. Kingsland, Leigh Knapp, Chester Krum, Shauncey F. Schultz, Henry Loudermann, Henry Paschall, Henry Overstolz, Gus Priest, Myer Rosenblatt, Frank Shapleigh, Edward Simmons, Arthur Soper, Alexander Smith, Robert Tansey, William H. Thompson, Charles Vogel, Julius Walsh, Ellis Wainright and Erastus Wells.

=== Mythology ===
The mythology was in large part created by Alonzo W. Slayback, a former confederate Colonel who served with a Missouri Cavalry Regiment. Inspired by Irish poet Thomas Moore's Lalla Rookh poem, he dubbed it The First Panorama of Progress of the Veiled Prophets. He wrote in his diary on October 5, 1878:

“Today I gave to the printer the descriptive manuscript whereby I have woven a classical story, and brought into order and coherency the ‘Floats’ for the Parade, or Illuminated nocturnal pageant of the secret society known as the ‘Veiled Prophets.’ I think it is the nearest thing to a ‘stroke of genius’ that I ever produced.” ... “a prose poem,” had “brought order, and identity out of some very gorgeous, but very meaningless representations.”

In Moore's poem, the Veiled Prophet was a disfigured man who considered himself a prophet with a "veil'd and awful face".

== Membership ==
Spencer notes that the Veiled Prophet published a "nearly complete" membership list in the newspapers up until 1899. Despite continued outside claims of absolute secrecy, they have typically provided some information. Newspaper stories in the 1980s and 1990s have noted that debutantes are daughters of members; wives of members are "ladies of honor". Membership may pass from father to son. Biographies and obituaries sometimes mention if a person was a member of the VP.

In the initial stages of the Veiled Prophet, multiple news articles suggested that the St. Louis branch of the Knights of St. Patrick, an organization dedicated to the Irish, their descendants and its culture, were the new Veiled Prophets. The VPs purchased the old Knights of St. Patrick space downtown to use as "The Den" for storing parade floats.

According to member B. C. Korshot in his 1997 book, the Veiled Prophet organization in the mid 1960s was a rather large organization and met monthly. He notes that members either had generational wealth or had made a name for themselves in their career and were successful. Korshot also states that the debutantes of the ball were daughters of members.

In 1979, after multiple protests, the Veiled Prophet organization admitted its first three Black members: Dr. William C. Banton II, Dr. Eugene Mitchell and Dr. R. Jermone Williams

=== Annual dues and members ===
- 1878 Founding: $25 initially, by December it was $100. 200 members
- 1899: Approximately 400 members
- 1910s: Approximately 1,000
- 1972: $250. Approximately 900 members
- 1978: $300. Approximately 1,000 members
- 1979: $320
- 1982: At least over 1,000 members
- 1996: 2,000

Spencer also notes that membership "mushroomed" in the 80s.

=== Jewish membership ===
In the first few decades, Veiled Prophet membership included a few prominent Jewish civic leaders and businessmen. Moses Fraley was a founding member in 1878. He would go on to be the president of the United Jewish Charities and the first Board President of the Jewish Federation of St. Louis. Louis P. Aloe, president of the St. Louis Board of Aldermen, was also a member. Charles Stix's daughter Winifred was a Veiled Prophet debutante in 1914. He owned a retail store called The Famous which was purchased by David May; May would merge later The Famous with the William Barr Dry Goods Co to create Famous-Barr. Dr. Hanau Loeb's daughter Irene was another debutante. He was a Dean of Medicine at St. Louis University. Newspapers such as The Jewish Voice noted when there were Jewish debutantes in the Veiled Prophet.

Due to the ball typically being held on the Tuesday of Fair Week, which started on the first Monday of October, multiple times the procession and ball fell on the eve of Yom Kippur.

=== Grand Oracle of the Veiled Prophets ===
According to Veiled Prophet member Walter B. Stevens' notes (available for viewing at the Missouri Historical Society) and historian Thomas Spencer's 2000 book, the following men served as the Grand Oracle of the Veiled Prophets:

- John G. Priest: 1878-1879, 1885-1886
- Charles E. Slayback: 1880
- John T. Davis: 1881
- Edward C. Simmons: 1882-1883
- George Bain: 1884
- Frank Gaiennie: 1887-1893
- Lawrence D. Kingsland: 1894-1902
- Walter B. Stevens: 1916

More recently:

- Tom K. Smith: 1972
- Andrew N. Baur: 1994
- Jack Biggs: 1996
- Rusty Hagar: 1999

By the 1990s, the Grand Oracle of the Veiled Prophets served two year terms. Other elected Veiled Prophets include Ed Schnuck, Edwin S. Jones, Robert R. Hermann, Clarance Barksdale, John Lashly, Edwin R. Culver III, Orrin Sage Wightman III, James McDonnell, Roland Richards, Bill Maritz, Bill Danforth, Ted Jones and Chuck Knight.

Curtis Wilson of the St. Louis Post Dispatch noted on membership issues in March 1972, approximately six months prior to Smith's unveiling:

Lately, something new has been happening in the VP order. Heads of some companies are dropping out. Even worse, members say, fathers of past Queens and special maids are dropping out.

== Protests and integration timeline ==
=== 1930s–1940s ===
Before World War II, the African-American community in St. Louis crowned its own "Veiled Prophet Queen," who included Ernestine Steele in 1939 and Blanche Vashon (later Sinkler), Georgia Williams, and Evelyn Hilliard. A 1940 newspaper column said that for years the official VP Parade had drawn

many persons, white and colored, to the city . . . [and that] Years ago there was a dance for the colored citizenry on that night, but that affair was long discontinued. Five years ago, Mrs. Zenobia Shoulders Johnson, one of the city's most active church and civic workers, conceived the idea of a style show which would culminate in the crowning of the "Veiled Prophet's Queen," someone representative of real St. Louis culture and society, much in the same manner of the original event. The idea caught fire, and from the first night, overflow crowds have witnessed the event at St. James [ A.M.E. ] Church. And, in addition, the idea became so popular that this year there are fully half a dozen similar projects as conceived by Mrs. Johnson being held this week by various other racial groups.

=== ACTION's protests ===
Action Council to Improve Opportunities for Negroes (ACTION), a non-violent and direct action protest organization, did not protest the VP so it could be integrated. It was seen as a symbol of institutionalized racism and the goal was to abolish it. When the VP organization admitted its first three Black members in 1979, the press asked ACTION for comment. As ACTION member Jacqueline Bell put it, "Hey, you guys have missed the point! We weren't trying to integrate the damned thing. You missed what we were trying to do."

In 1965, ACTION launched its "More and Better-Paying Jobs for Black Males, the family chief bread winner", targeting companies like Southwestern Bell, Laclede Gas, Union Electric, McDonnell Aircraft Corporation and McDonald Construction(the company that built the Gateway Arch). They wanted good paying jobs for Black men, including 4,080 jobs across said target companies. When those demands were not met, public demonstrations began. In 1967, they learned that the CEOs of the companies utilizing discriminatory hiring practices were also active members within the VP organization. As Percy Green describes it:

According to ACTION, this racist social connection was the glue that reinforced these CEOs' practices of not hiring African American males into decent-paying jobs. After ACTION began to expose their VP connections, the negative public association caused some of these CEOs to begin hiring black males in higher-paying jobs.

=== 1966 ===
On September 24, 1966, Russell Hayes was shot while in police custody for a suspected burglary. On the 26th, Percy Green, head of ACTION passed out leaflets urging that the annual VP parade be "stopped" in response to the killing, calling the Veiled Prophet "the personification of St. Louis racism and white supremacy."

A few days later, the St. Louis Post Dispatch published a letter from Walter W. Witte, rector of St. Stephen's Episcopal Church, the first widely circulated postwar opposition to the VP parade and ball. He wrote:

. . . I recall my fascination some 10 years ago when I was told that St. Louis had a Veiled Prophet Parade. I was new to the city then and I presumed that this gala event must be some climactic community celebration, perhaps historical in nature. Then to discover that this was the yearly feast of the rich, culminating in a "coming out" ball at the municipal auditorium . . . was indeed a disappointment. Since then disappointment has given place to disgust. The spectacle of the wealthy daring to parade through the neighborhoods or near neighborhoods of the poor is outrageous.

And the ritual. Is it merely "cute," or are we witnessing the honest to God cult of the affluent with its prophets, queens, attending angels, heavenly courts taken seriously and paid for dearly by the educated business and professional men of the community? . . . .

Could it be turned into a genuine community event? I have an idea. If the powers would contact me, I have several outstandingly beautiful candidates in my parish for the Queen of Love and Beauty. Mind you, these candidates are not Mary Institute graduates nor are they currently attending Wellesley, Smith, or Vassar, nor are they likely to be. But they would, indeed, add beauty. Then again they would probably be disqualified. They suffer from one serious limitation. They are black.

=== 1967 ===
ACTION scheduled a "City Dwellers Week" to coincide with Veiled Prophet activities. Its code name was Target 84, a reference to the Prophet's 84th visit. The aim was to force an end to the VP, which William L. Matheus said was "a symbol of racial and economic oppression."

On September 30, 1967, ACTION sponsored a "Black Veiled Prophet Ball" in parody of the VP Ball, the latter which was said to be fostering "racial discrimination and segregation." The group planned the selection of a Queen of Human Justice, who would be chosen according to the number of tickets sold on her behalf.

On October 1, 1967, a "small group of marchers," led by Patrick Dougherty, a St. Louis University professor, contended in the suburb of Clayton, Missouri, that the VP Ball and Parade were "offensive to the Negro community" and should be transformed into a children's event.

The next weekend, some fifty demonstrators were in a sidewalk protest across the street from the VP Ball in Kiel Auditorium. Leaders, who had no tickets, demanded entry to the hall, and on October 6 three of them were arrested on charges of disturbing the peace and failure to obey the commands of a police officer; they were released on bond. They were Precious Barnes, in regalia as the "Black Veiled Prophet," Esther Davis, who was the Queen of Human Justice, and Witte. Journalists said the news people were shoved and jostled by police and that some officers held hats and hands in front of cameras to prevent photos. Ron Gould, an 18-year-old seminary student, said he took a photo of a policeman beating a black woman, and another officer smashed his camera with a baton, then stepped on the exposed film. He later filed a complaint against the police department, which ruled he had no case. (Charges against Barnes, Davis, and Witte were dropped on January 23, 1968, because of insufficient evidence.)

The next day, Barbara Torrence, Ruth Poland, and Mary Ann Kerstetter were arrested for lying in the street in front of the Veiled Prophet Parade in protest of alleged racial discrimination. They were sentenced to thirty days in jail for resisting arrest but were placed on probation for a year.

==== St. Stephens Church resignations ====
In October 1967, Bishop George L. Cadigan asked Witte and William Matheus, St. Stephens Church curator, to resign their positions because of "misunderstandings about procedural matters and the seeming inability of Mr. Witte to relate to the program of the diocese." The activities of the two in demonstrations, particularly against the Veiled Prophet Ball, had "incurred the wrath of many Episcopal laymen," a newspaper report said.

Witte said he and Matheus regarded the annual VP ceremonies as symbols of social bigotry and economic discrimination. Cadigan responded that he "holds no brief for the Veiled Prophet Ball and Parade, and it may well be a serious affront to the non-affluent members of the St. Louis community," but, he said, the two clergymen "vastly overrated" the VP's significance, devoting "great energy, but little skill, in attacking it."

=== 1968 ===
In 1968, United Press International reported that "ACTION has staged demonstrations at the ball and parade in recent years to protest that the ball was for whites only and that the parade flaunted white wealth down a route that skirted Negro neighborhoods. The route of this year's parade has been shifted to avoid some of the poorer neighborhoods."

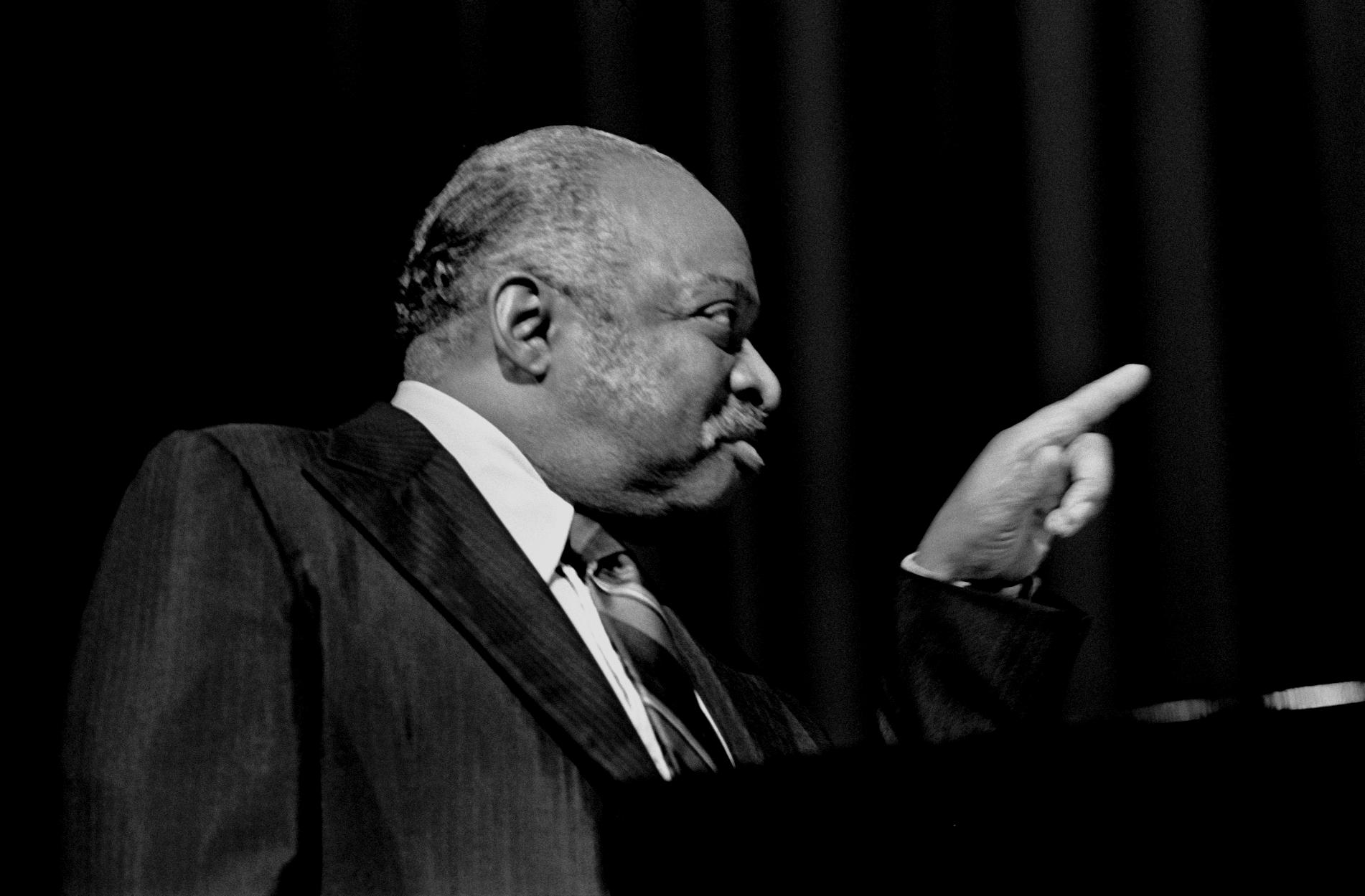
Count Basie in 1974

ACTION threatened to stage protests against musician Count Basie unless he canceled an agreement to play in the VP Parade, whose theme that year was "Music for Everyone." Basie agreed on September 25 to withdraw, "for personal reasons."

Percy Green, William Brown, and William Mitchell were arrested on September 27, 1968, when they were denied entry to the ball. They ignored orders to stop marching directly in front of Kiel Auditorium. Sarah Jones and Barbara Jean Saper were arrested and fined after they chained themselves to one of the floats.

=== 1969 ===
Carl Jackson (that year's Black Veiled Prophet), Madame Carol (the Black VP queen), Lois Greer (Queen of Human Justice) and George Johnson were arrested after Jackson and Carol presented a slip of blue paper at the Kiel Auditorium door which they said was an invitation and refused to leave.

A convention of the Episcopal Diocese of Missouri in October 1969 adopted a resolution stating that "Actions of the Veiled Prophet Society are such to be a source of constant irritation to the black communities" in the diocese.

=== 1970 and 1971 ===
Judge G. Johnson, Sharon Hall, and Rita Scott were arrested in 1970 when they tried to enter the VP Ball by presenting a written statement in lieu of tickets.

Percy Green, Melvin Carr, Florence Jarrett, Ralph Brown, and Gina Scott were arrested on December 22, 1971, on a charge of general peace disturbance when they attempted to enter Kiel Auditorium with no tickets.

=== 1972 - Unmasking the Prophet ===
ACTION decided it was possible to unveil the Veiled Prophet and settled on the parade in September. While the Veiled Prophet didn't ride in that parade, ACTION member Florence Jarrett got the idea to unveil him at the ball held in December.

They tapped two white woman members of ACTION in particular for the task: Gena Scott and Jane Sauer. ACTION had acquired four tickets, including two from a higher up member in the VP organization. On December 23, 1972, Gena Scott, Phyllis Knight, and Jane Sauer, dressed in their white formal evening gowns, walked together into Kiel Auditorium at the south entrance. Meanwhile, Charles Reed, that year's Black Veiled Prophet went to the entrance with Beverly Crosby and Florence Jarrett, presented the gatekeeper with three tickets and a statement demanding entrance. They were denied entry because they were not "dressed properly." Refusing to leave, they were arrested and taken to a police station.

Sauer and Scott took balcony seats on opposite sides of the house. They were able to secure front row balcony seats vital to their plan, surprised that the balcony was almost empty. Sauer noted:

"But of the people on the balcony, only a handful were black. I remember one black lady who was sitting near me with what looked like to be her grandchildren. She must have been a housemaid for one of the families downstairs. She didn't applaud at all until one of the debutantes was introduced, and then she really applauded. Her grandchildren didn't applaud until she gave them a little nudge. Then they all applauded too. After the deb was seated, the woman gathered her grandchildren and left."

They had studied the timing of the program carefully and picked a time when the focus was on the debutantes and Veiled Prophet. At Scott's signal, Sauer began dropping leaflets into the audience, then "threw the rest of the leaflets over the railing" as two men converged on her and began to pull her away.

Meanwhile, Scott climbed over the balcony and began sliding down a large, black cable before it broke away from its wall fastening. After falling to the ground, with the wind knoked out of her and three crushed ribs, she navigated her way through a few Veiled Prophet members, looking for a way to unveil him. Taking advantage of everyone's surprise, she walked straight up to the Veiled Prophet and yanked the veil down, out from under his helmet-like headdress. Once he had been unveiled, everyone finally reacted and she was tanked off stage and whisked into a side room.

The Post-Dispatch reported that "the Veiled Prophet, whom everybody could see was bald, and very angry, struggled gallantly to restore the veil and its 95-year-old tradition [of anonymity] to its proper place." The St. Louis Journalism Review was the only publication willing to print the ousted Veiled Prophet's name: Monsanto Vice President and Director of Commercial Products Tom K. Smith Jr.

Scott said: "The chairman of the VP committee, Alexander Cornwell Jr., had wanted to press charges, but when he was informed that the Veiled Prophet would have to appear in open court to do so, the whole matter was dropped." Scott's ribs were diagnosed as bruised and possibly broken.

ACTION explained in a printed statement:

"In October 1965, ACTION began the attack on the white Veiled Prophet Parade and Ball. ACTION charged that the white VP was a white racist affair...It was emphasized that the white VP excluded all blacks and most white St. Louisans, yet always used the Kiel Auditorium, which is a public building paid for by the St. Louis taxpayers. Remember, black St. Louisans pay taxes too!"

=== 1973 ===
In early 1973, Gena Scott was awakened when her car was bombed outside of her apartment. Her apartment was vandalized numerous times.

In November 1973, a class-action suit was filed on behalf of all black St. Louisans by Percy Green, George (Judge) Johnson and Melvin Carr, claiming the VP organization's rental agreement for Kiel was illegal and that blacks viewed the VP Committee as an "antiblack, semisecret organization made up of members of the economic, political and social white power structure" of St. Louis.

=== 1975 and 1976 ===
In 1975, ACTION member Patrick Dougherty unfurled a banner on stage reading "ACTION Protests Racist VP."

The demonstration for 1976's ball involved a "cry in" for racism. Two ACTION members climbed up on the stage and sprayed what Green called "commercial tear gas" at VP audience members along the stage.

=== Organization integration ===
In 1979 the Veiled Prophet Organization admitted its first three black members: Dr. William C. Banton II, Dr. Eugene Mitchell and Dr. R. Jerome Williams. As Dr. Williams told St. Louis Public Radio in 2011:

"I went along with it to pave the way for future generations," Williams recalled in an interview at his home in the Central West End. "But I paid lots of hell." Friends questioned why he would want to join an elitist organization. Williams said he believed in walking through doors when they opened.

And later on in the article: Dr. Williams, for his part, quit the VP after a couple of years. Once on the inside, he said he still found it "an elitist organization .... run by a small circle of millionaires dictating to people what the hell to do."

But today, he feels differently about the Veiled Prophet group. "They have really opened their doors to all people," Williams said. "The leadership isn't very open, but the organization is."

=== Post-1970s protests ===
In 1987, fair officials and St. Louis Metro Police Department were confronted with accusations of racism when they closed the Eads Bridge to pedestrian access, which reduced the ability of attendees from East St. Louis to reach the VP fair, where predominantly black residents were blamed for the crime that had been occurring there. Judge John F. Nangle ordered the bridge to reopen, saying that there was no proof that the crime was caused by East St. Louisans.

Some thirty people protesting police shootings in Ferguson, Missouri, and elsewhere in 2014 marched and chanted outside the Hyatt Hotel, St. Louis, where the ball was taking place.

== Secrecy ==
The VP organization has traditionally attempted to keep its membership rolls private. In his Centennial History of Missouri, Walter B. Stevens wrote: "Mystery as to preparations greatly enhances public interest" and means "that the membership must be moved by altruistic motives in giving their fellow Missourians this annual pageant; that no public limelight could be focused on the doers."

According to an anonymous member providing information to the St. Louis Post Dispatch in 1914:

“Nobody except the members is allowed to contribute to the fund. Every member is pledged not to reveal his or any fellow member’s connection with the pageant. The organization is a close corporation. Followers of the Veiled Prophet seldom resign. The membership is limited and usually descends from father to son. Candidates are passed upon with great care by a secret committee and the important qualifications are personal quality and business or professional standing. Many of the members are men of moderate means. The night of the pageant each member, as he is assigned to duty, loses his personality and becomes a number. As such he remains until the ceremonies are over, his name not once being spoken. Much attention is given to the preparation of the invitation list for each ball. Each member submits the names of a limited number of friends. No social set dictates to whom invitations shall be issued, and hence the guests are representative of the city in the best sense.”

As for the leadership, public records showed in 2021 that "the executive officers remain some of the region's most powerful businessmen and dynastic patricians[,] with surnames such as Schnucks (grocery stores), Desloge (lead mining), Maritz (employee incentives and corporate travel) and Kemper (banking)." The prophet crowned "a queen every year; their last names include Kemper, Busch, Danforth, Schnuck, Schlafly, Chouteau, Cabanne, Niedringhaus, Desloge and other historic St. Louis families. The identity of Maids of Honor, one of whom was tapped as Queen, was also kept secret until they were introduced at the Ball."

The first woman publicly connected to VP administration was Jane Lindemann in 1999 as Executive Director.

== Veiled Prophets and parades in other cities ==
In 1882, members of the Veiled Prophet were part of the Order of Orioles parade in Baltimore, MD with named Veiled Prophet members Charles Chambers and Henry Ames. Veiled Prophet member J. Allison Richards visited Houston's No-Tsu-Oh carnival in 1909 for pointers. The St. Louis Veiled Prophets gave advice to the Valley Hunt Club on ideas that would later turn into the Tournament of Roses, also known as the Rose Parade.

Multiple cities either discussed or attempted to create a Veiled Prophet like parade including Denver, Colorado in 1886; Hailey, Idaho in 1887; Dallas, Texas in 1899; Cincinnati, Ohio in 1899; Salt Lake City, Utah in 1908.

Veiled Prophet costumes were either loaned or sold to other cities including for a Springfield, Illinois ball in 1919 and Lincoln, Nebraska's Tartarrax Pageant. Floats were also either loaned or sold to other cities including Chicago for its Chicago Day in 1893 and Bloomington, Illinois in 1898.

=== Chicago Veiled Prophet Association ===
A "Veiled Prophet Association" requested permits to hang banners across streets in February 1895 and March 1898. (Chicago would not have a masonic Veiled Prophets of the Enchanted Realm organization until 1906.)

In 1897, as the Inter Ocean states, "the Cook County Democracy is to be 'known this year as the Veiled Prophets' Masque Carnival.'" It included a parade and ball. Chicago's Tammany Hall hosted Veiled Prophet masked carnival in 1900. The Cook County Republican Marching Club held a Veiled Prophet ball in 1901.

=== Veiled Prophet of the Great Smoky Mountains ===
Beginning in 1896, Knoxville opened their trade carnival with a "Veiled Prophet of the Great Smoky Mountains". (Knoxville would not have a masonic Veiled Prophets of the Enchanted Realm organization until 1915)

=== Milwaukee, Wisconsin ===
Albert C. Bird, a Freight Traffic Manager under Jay Gould's railroad empire, sought to create something similar to the Veiled Prophets in Milwaukee in 1889. However, two years prior in 1887, Milwaukee already had a Veiled Prophet like carnival in the works:

"The liege subjects of Rex Momus in Milwaukee number at present abotu seventy-five but the chater membership will comprise of about 150 of the leading business and professional men. Who they are will not be known. While the order is not a secret society with rirtual and kindred surroundings, it is a "mysterious" organization. It will exist, but the membership, place of meeting, etc., will be kept from the public. It will be conducted on the same general plan as the Veiled Prophets of St. Louis, and will give a Mardi Gras or carnivall annually."

The fourth annual Carnival of the Veiled Prophet of the Columbia Club was held in 1895. In 1899, the Milwaukee Sentenial Journal notes that the Milwaukee Pageant is being built by the same men who built the Veiled Prophet parade. By 1900, P. J. Toomey, a two decade veteran director of Veiled Prophet pageants, was overseeing their third electric pageant. Milwaukee had a Veiled Prophets' ball as part of their carnival celebrartions as late as 1914. (Milwaukee would not have a masonic Veiled Prophets of the Enchanted Realm organization until 1906.)

== First Parade and Ball ==
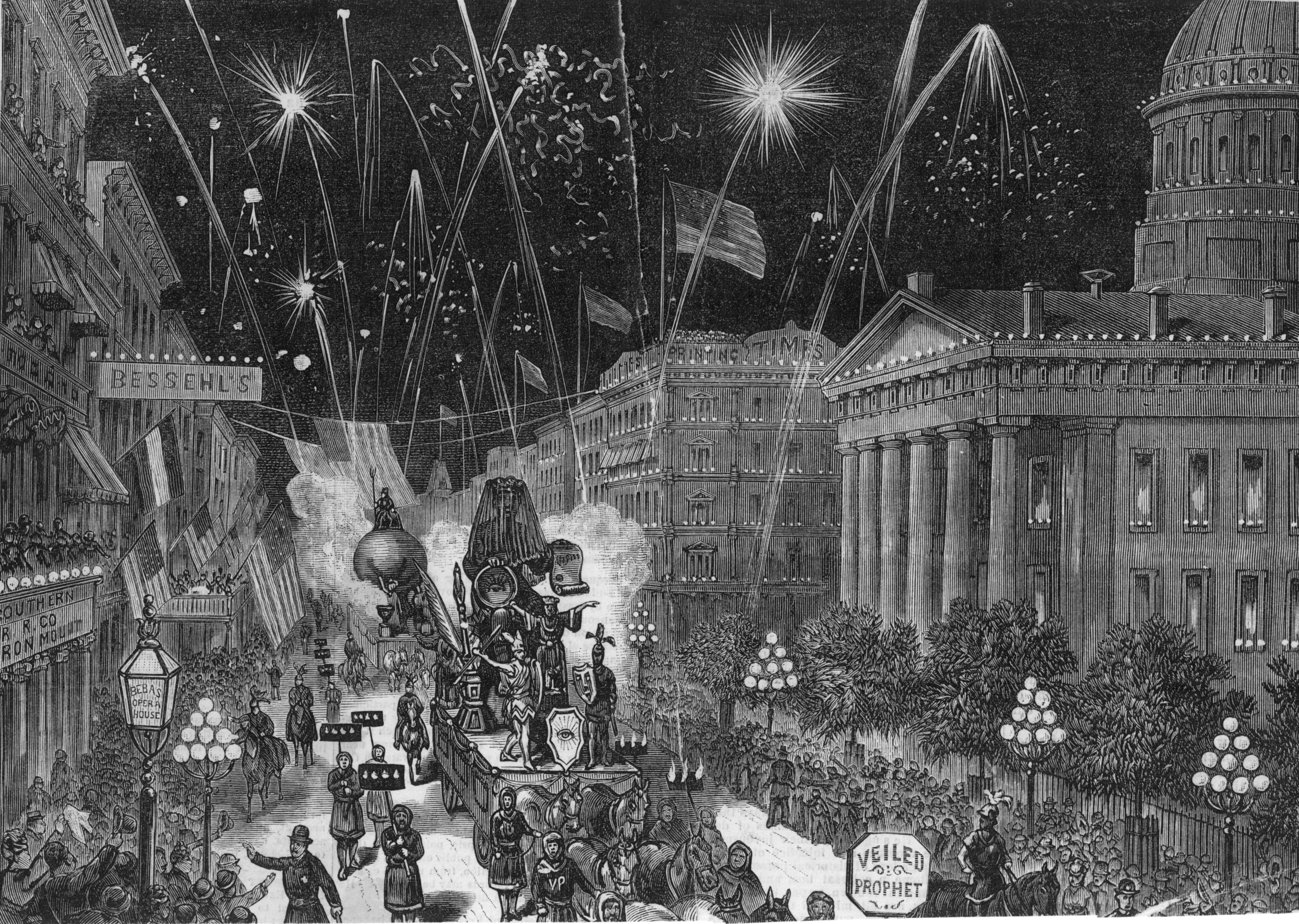
Initial Veiled Prophet Parade, 1878, with the Prophet as a giant figure on a horse-drawn float. Men walked on the side to cast light with portable burners. (Image by Edward Jump from Frank Leslie's Illustrated Newspaper, October 1878.)

The first parade and ball were held on Tuesday, October 8, 1878. The Prophet was selected secretly from among the members, who were made up of St. Louis's business and civic elite. The first Prophet was John G. Priest, a member of the city's Board of Police Commissioners and real estate operator.

=== 1878 Parade ===
The beginning of the procession was headed by a section of policemen, followed by a New Orleans band and hooded individuals holding flambeaux. After that came the first three Veiled Prophets en masque. The Grand Oracle of the Veiled Prophet was represented on the final float of the 1878 parade as:

a huge figure about twenty-five feet high, and looking like an overgrown cigar store sign, with a mosquito bar (mosquito netting) over its face. He was costumed in green and red, and was surrounded by members of his court. His scribe stood by with huge quill and a reservoir of ink at hand, ready to issue his mandates. Two high priests were behind his throne, and near by a villainous-looking executioner and a blood-curdling butcher's block. Fierce and warlike guards, with breastplates of brass and steel and helmets of the same metals, kept watchful eyes upon the sacred precincts of the Prophet.

In 1882 the Globe-Democrat described the same giant dummy as a "huge masked figure staring sphinx-like at the crowd." It had been used in previous parades until it was retired and replaced that year by a [human] "being with face masked and a long, white beard."

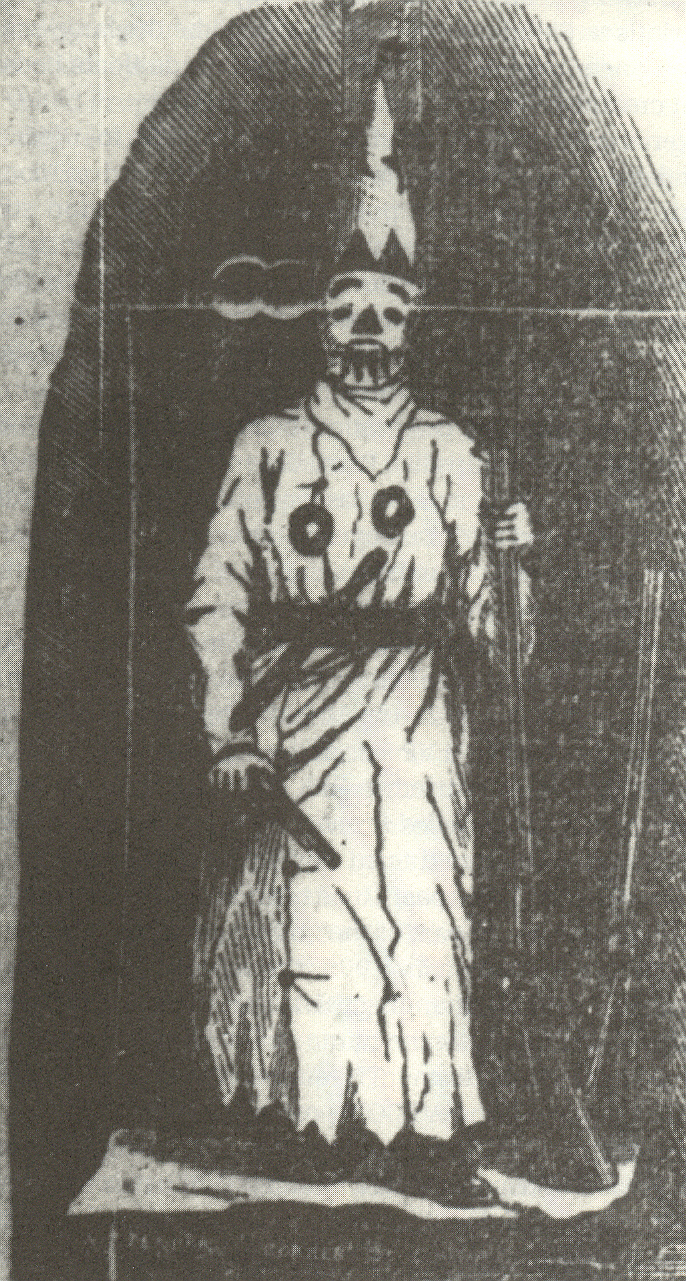
An 1875 image of a man wearing Ku Klux Klan garb, reprinted in the Missouri Republican on October 6, 1878, and misidentified as The Veiled Prophet

On Sunday, October 6, the Missouri Republican had captioned a woodcut of a masked, armed, and hooded man posing in Ku Klux Klan garb (previously used in the newspaper on August 23, 1875) as "the original Veiled Prophet himself," adding that "It will be readily observed from the accoutrements of the Prophet [a pistol, a shotgun, and a billy club] that the procession is not likely to be stopped by street cars or anything else." Historian Thomas M. Spencer interpreted the Republican's reference to "street cars" as related to the Great Railroad Strike of 1877. "Newspaper feature stories since the 1950s have described the 'first Veiled Prophet parade' as a way of healing the wounds of a bitter labor-management fight," the 1877 St. Louis general strike, he wrote. He added, however, that the first Veiled Prophet parade was "more a show of power than a gesture of healing."

=== 1878 Ball ===
The initial ball in 1878 was held in the festively decorated Grand Hall of the Merchants Exchange, beginning in the late evening after the completion of the Parade. Its official start was a quadrille of costumed men from the floats of the parade and the women who awaited them. After two dances, the first being J.S. Bach's Royal Quadrille, the men retired to replace their disguises with formal wear for the rest of the evening.

Suzanne (Susie) Slayback was chosen by the first Veiled Prophet, John G. Priest, to be the "belle" of the ball.

== Prophet's Arrival ==
Normally the Prophet was introduced to the public either as a real person or as a giant replication when his parade exited the "gloomy-visaged" Den, where the organization had its headquarters. But he also arrived via a different method, as follows:

=== Boat ===
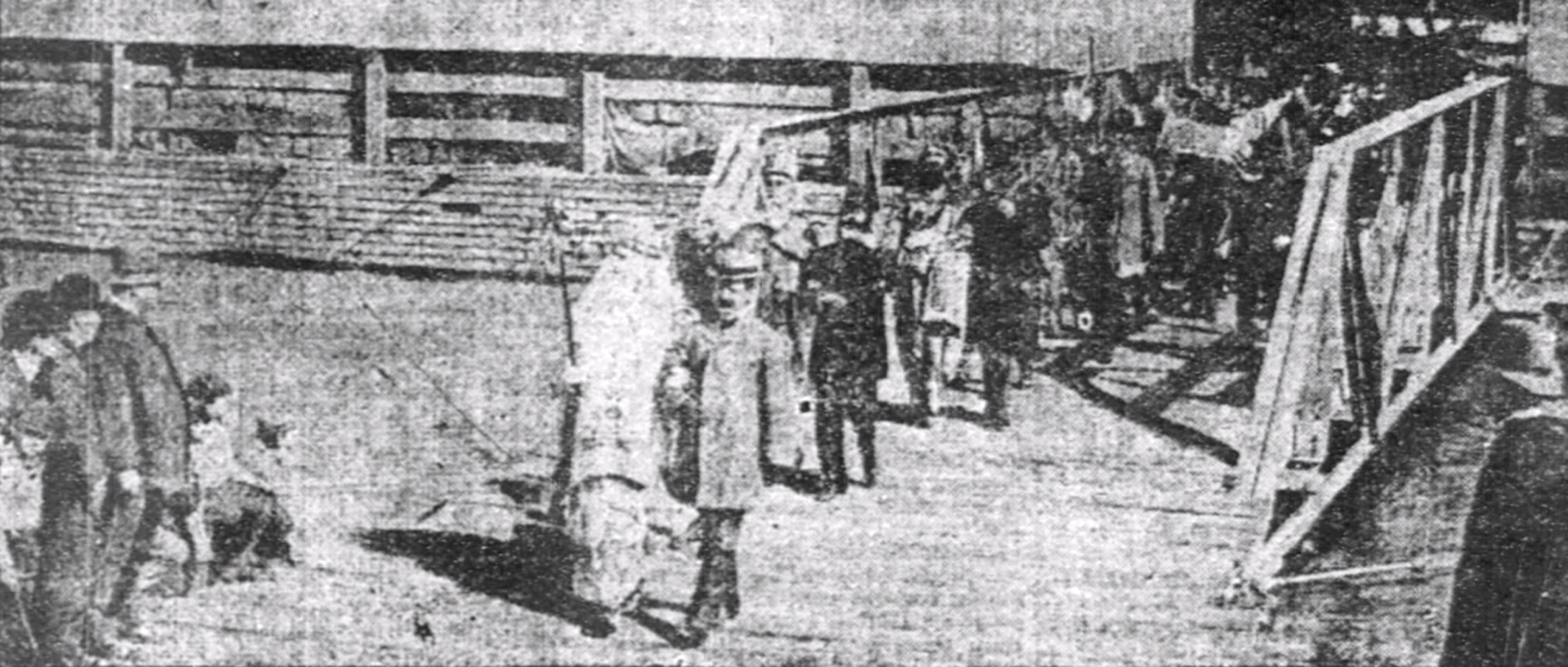
In 1902 Judge Selden P. Spencer led the Veiled Prophet from a riverboat to the dock at Jefferson Barracks.

For the first time, the Prophet came to St. Louis by boat on October 1, 1892, on the upriver steamer War Eagle. (See note.)' A group of civic leaders sailed to Jefferson Barracks via the Republic and the Paul Tulane to greet him. The First Regiment marched from St. Louis, and then everybody went back to St. Louis in fifty carriages or marched there in a special afternoon parade through crowded streets; a reception was held at the Exposition Building.

"A wagonette drawn by four horses went down to the staging," the Post-Dispatch reported, "and the Prophet took his seat on a raised cushion so that he might be seen by the curious and admiring multitude which he was to pass." At the St. Louis wharf, Samuel Kennard, an organizer of the Saint Louis Exposition, presented the Prophet with the keys to the city, and a band played "Hail to the Chief."

The VP arrived again via upriver boat Spread Eagle on October 1, 1900, at the foot of Vine Street, to be escorted to the Coliseum, where thousands had gathered.

=== Airplane ===
The Prophet arrived by airplane four times, from 1924 through 1927, followed by an informal parade to the Den.

== Parade Floats and The Den ==
The Den has been a building or complex of buildings where the floats and costumes have been prepared for the VP and America's Birthday Parade activities. Over time, the intricate floats, costumes, wigs and masks have been designed and created by skilled artists such as Andrew Fueger, Carl Gutherz, and Paul Berdanier.

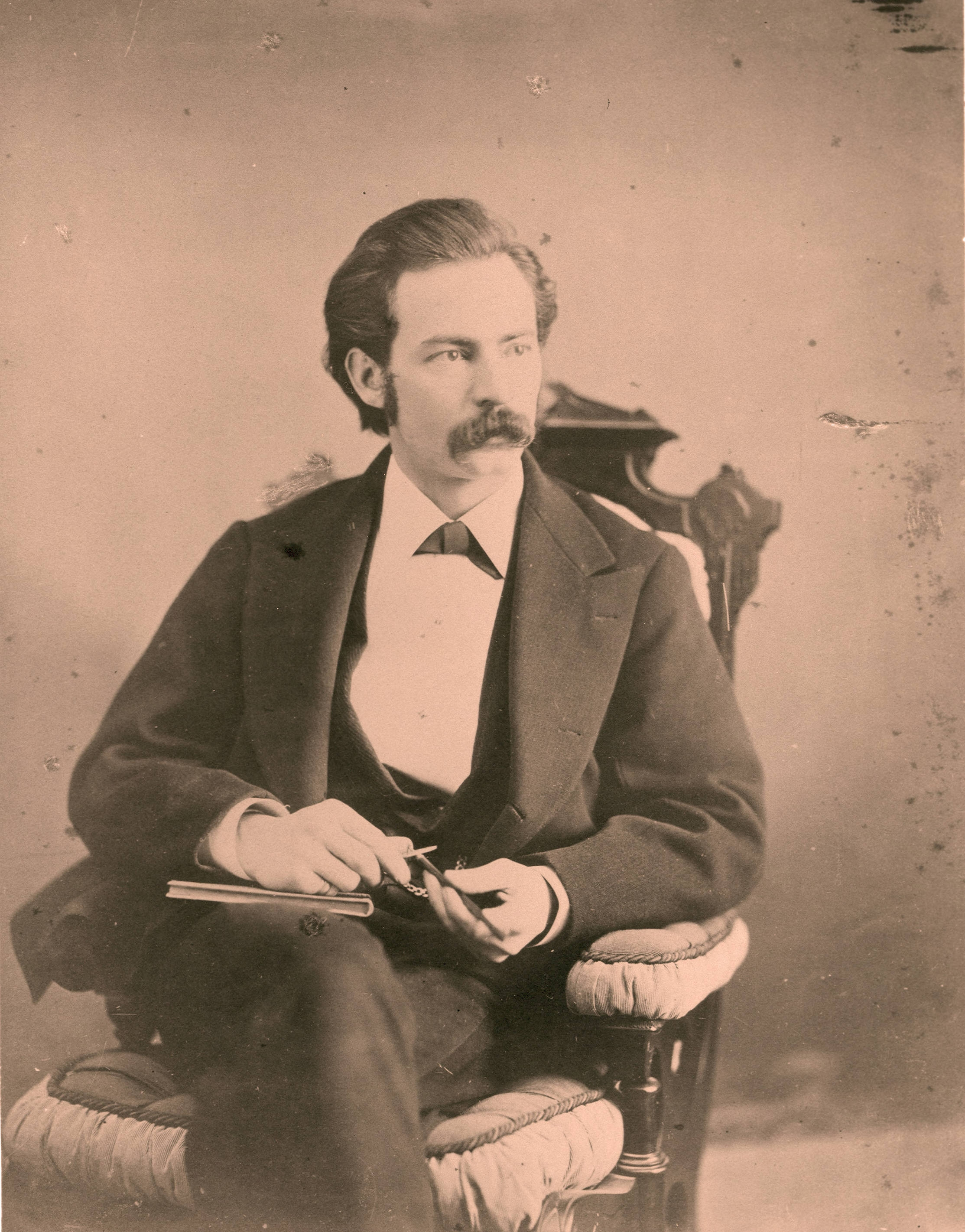
Artist Carl Gutherz was early in charge of float and costume design.

On parade night in 1879, the Den was described by a reporter as a "great black building running along the side of Twelfth Street, from Market to Chestnut. It stood dim and grim against the evening sky, with not a luminous line or brilliant knot-hole to be seen against its gloomy walls until 7 o'clock, when the yard gate to the east of the building suddenly opened and displayed to view an array of torch-bearers ready to march forward at a moment's notice."

In 1880, design of the floats was done by artist Carl Gutherz, and his drawings were sent to Paris, France, where the costumes were made. The next year, 1881, St. Louis artists Thomas C. Noxon and Richard Halley did the work.

The Den was at 12th and Chestnut in 1883. The Den land on the northeast corner of 12th and Market was sold in June 1884 by Charles L. Hunt to Thomas T. Turner, bundled with other property.

In 1890 through 1924, the floats were prepared in a "large building" between 21st and 22nd at Walnut street. In 1893, it was written that:

The squatty brick building was the den of the Veiled Prophet. . . . 2120 Walnut Street is the number. . . . It contains no window nearer the ground than 15 feet. . . . In each door, about 20 feet from the bottom,, are two windows, heavily grated and covered on the inside with curtains, . . . a wealth of skylight perforates the roof. Around this building as early as 6 o'clock people began to gather [on VP night]. Little lads in the mischievous years were as plentiful there as the proverbial leaves in Vallambrosa. They got down flat on their stomachs at the bottom of the corrugated iron doors and tried to get a look at his mysterious Majesty's splendors.

In 1911, the Industrial and Historical Pageant corporation of Chicago was contracted to supervise the pageant.

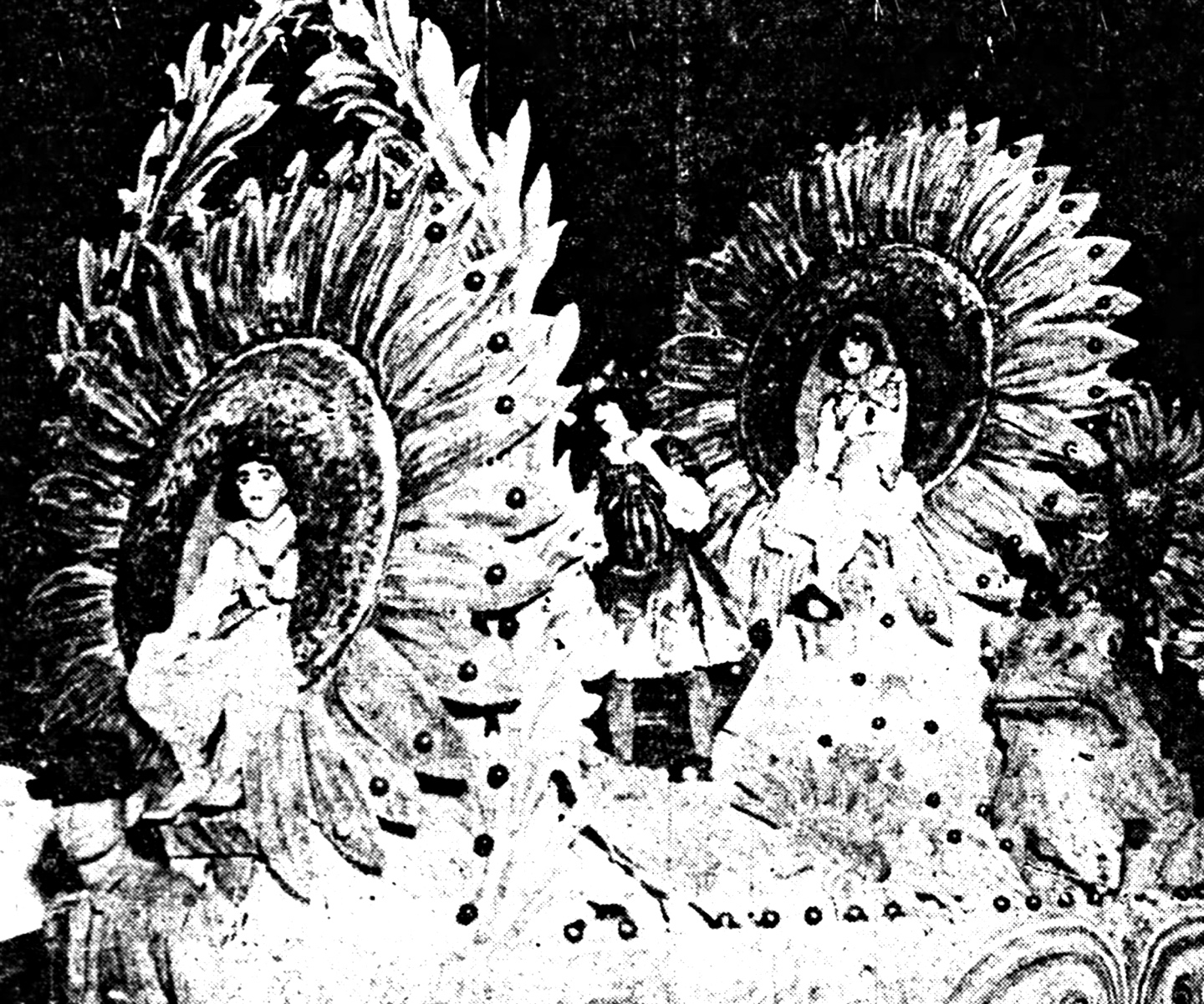
1920 float illustrating theme of "Flowers and Plants"

The Stroh Brothers purchased the Walnut Street property in 1924, to replace the Den with a large garage for "trucks and passenger cars."

Burglars entered the Den at 102 Rankin Avenue on January 26, 1931, hammered the combination off the safe and escaped with $2,700 worth of jewelry, $250 in cash and a .32-caliber automatic pistol.

In 1932, the Den was on "dingy Rankin Avenue," the Post-Dispatch reported, number 102 South at LaClede, where it remained until at least 1958, when a fire damaged five floats being prepared for the VP Parade. Five firemen were overcome by dense, acrid smoke. The victims received bouquets and notes from the Veiled Prophet which said, "With deep appreciation and gratitude."

In the year of the fire, the St. Louis Post-Democrat claimed that the Den "becomes an ordinary warehouse as soon as the parade is over. Having no visible abiding place, the order is not subject to influence in other social and business clubs, and this again constitutes an important fact in its longevity."

The South Rankin building was demolished in April 1960 for redevelopment of Mill Creek Valley, and the Den was resurrected in a warehouse on Prospect Avenue.

The Post-Dispatch in 1981 described the Den as "a complex of former Falstaff brewery warehouses at 301 Prospect Avenue that serve as a combination workshop, storage facility and archives for VP parades and balls." In February 1991 the Den was a large cinderblock building near Spring Avenue and Forest Park Boulevard. Brook Marion was the leading float painter of a six-man crew in the Den in 1999.

=== Ethnic floats ===
==== Nineteenth century ====
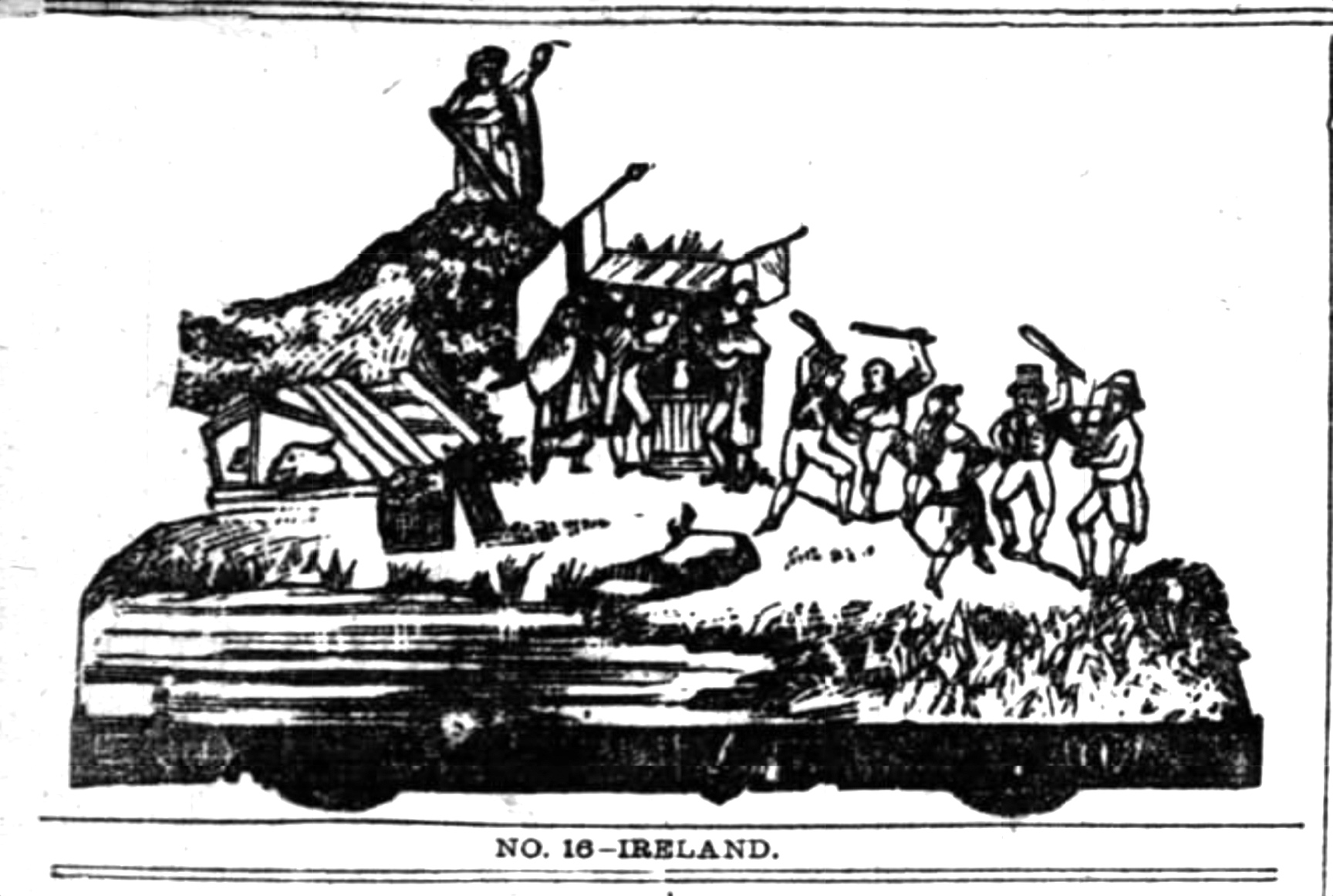
Drawing of the Irish float in the Globe-Democrat, October 4, 1882

In 1882, the parade theme took a new direction, which led to controversy over the inclusion of a float criticized for its portrayal of Irish people. The theme illustrated "the leading characteristics of the principal nations of Asia, Europe and Africa, and giving a special tableau of American scenes, representing the ballot box, the Indian on the plains, life on southern plantations and the western rivers. . . . The tableau came more directly within the comprehension of the average citizen than the mythological representations of previous years and was cheered to the echo."

Figures aboard the planned float included shillelagh-wielding men and a woman in "peasant costume" dancing to a fiddle. A "drinking booth with the Irish harp" is nearby. "A pig sty, with a couple of grunters anxiously peering over the side, stands to the left, a bushel basket of potatoes evidently tempting them."

But St. Louis members of the Irish Land League were incensed over one of the floats, and "it was universally agreed there that there would be a grand and frightful riot unless the Irish float was taken out of the procession." The Irishmen who drove the parade's teams and wagons said they would "withdraw their services" if the float was included, so the entry was removed.

Alonzo Slayback replied that the message of the "first procession" in 1878 had gone "over the heads of the spectators" and since then "we found that a float which aimed rather to convey a pleasant bit of fun pleased the people much better[,] and we have carried out this idea ever since. . . . Let them raise a finger against any part of the pageant, if they dare. I feel sure that there will be on hand a sufficiently large number of people . . . to prevent any attack. Yes, sir, just let them try it." The day this quotation appeared in the morning Post-Dispatch, Slayback stopped in the office of managing editor John A. Cockerill to request that the latter "suppress all mention of the action of certain citizens regarding the Irish float. . . . Our meeting was pleasant and he went away in good feeling," Cockerill said. The offending scene was eliminated, and other props were used on the refurbished float.

==== 20th century ====
In 1938, an Irish-descended group headed by Circuit Judge O'Neil Ryan protested the imagery on a float with the title of a popular song, "Has Anybody Here Seen Kelly?" The name of the float was soon changed to "The Sidewalks of New York." In addition, a statement from the Veiled Prophet organization said: "At the same time the Order announces that the float entitled 'Schnitzelbank' has been changed to 'Harvest Moon,'" which the Star-Times said was done "to forestall possible criticism arising out of the recent European developments."

=== Biblical theme ===
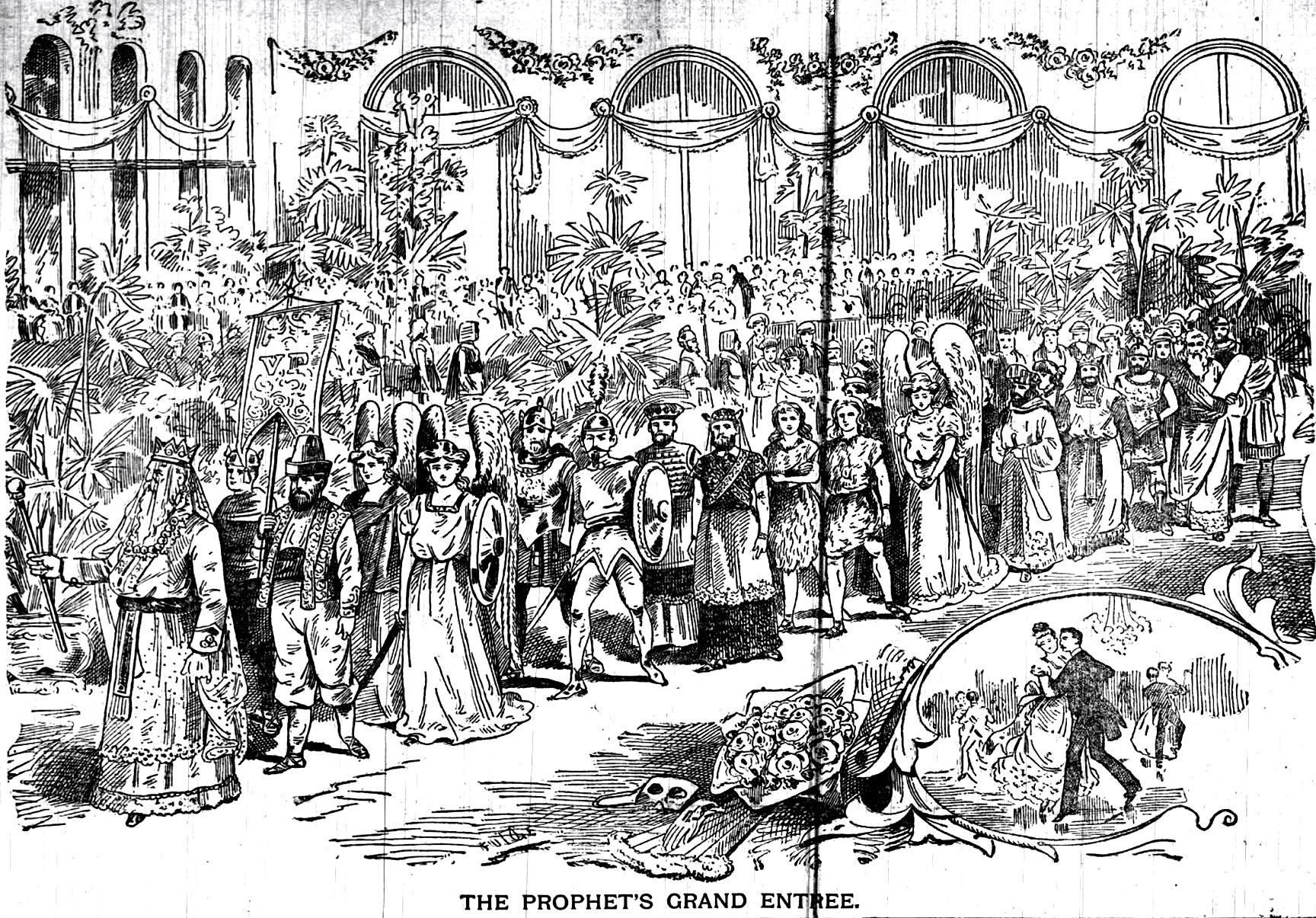
A Veiled Prophet leads the way in this grand entrance to the post-Parade 1887 VP Ball, followed by Biblical characters. The parade theme was the Old Testament of the Bible. At lower right, people dancing.

St. Louis Protestant minister S.J. Nichols castigated the Old Testament theme of the 1887 VP Parade. In a sermon on September 18, he made a "sweeping condemnation," particularly condemning the printed invitation to the ball, which included representations of the Ark of the Covenant and the Ten Commandments. He also denounced floats depicting Moses and Elijah.

Nichols said:

In this shocking prostitution of things sacred, there is a failure to make a distinction between sacred and profane, or common things, and it is calculated to foster the spirit of irreverence and bring God's Word into contempt. . . . All this is done in the name of a great city for gain. . . . [This] last great blunder is well calculated to bring St. Louis into disrepute with other cities . . . .

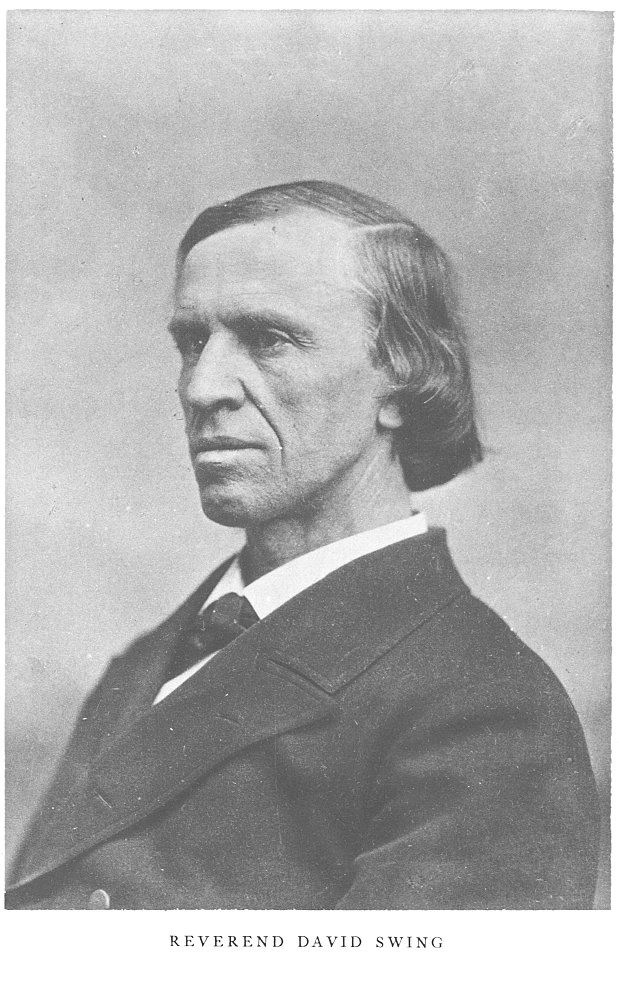
David Swing 'foolish old boys'

He was soon answered by David Swing, a widely known progressive minister from Chicago, who wrote:

The "Veiled Prophets" are a set of rather foolish old boys, who are not worthy of any special notice from the pulpit. Their parade once a year can not have much influence for or against the real cause of Christianity. . . . No one is hurt. . . . nearly all the episodes of the Old Testament have been repeatedly pictured in a humorous aspect . . . there are thousands of persons in St. Louis who will gain . . . their first lessons in sacred things . . . . They will learn by pictures of Bible scenes what they can never learn from the baseball grounds alone, nor from a life-long association with cigars and beer.

== Lighting ==
=== Torchbearers ===
As the first parade was held at night in 1878, it was lit by a thousand torchbearers, all dressed in brown habits with cowls walking beside the floats, carrying gasoline lanterns with three burners each,

the affairs looking not unlike sections of the footlights in a small theater in a town where the gas was uncertain as to brilliancy. Others held, with outstretched hands and averted face, long beacon lights, which burned alternately red and blue. The air was filled with the stifling, sulphurous fumes from the burning lights; the eyes of the throng were dazzled, and the air was filled with a unanimous cough.

Each man carried "a quadruple gasoline torch with a reflector behind the flame, [flanking it on either side] . . ., respectable but disagreeable flambeaux." The lamp bearers wore protectors to keep their wrists from burning.

In the second year, 1879, Daniel Carroll was in charge of the six hundred men hired to lead the horses and carry beacons and torches. He told his men

to be as mysterious as possible and to keep their cowls well drawn over their faces. . . . But the temperature and the weight of the torches began to tell . . . and . . . they threw back the cowls and . . . revealed in the ruddy light a perspiring congress of nations, for Carroll [in choosing his marchers had not been] hampered by any prejudices of race, color or previous condition of servitude.

Each float in 1879 was drawn by six horses, "covered with snow-white trappings, on which two cabalistic letters, 'V.P.,' were wrought in deep red color." Two mounted horsemen rode before and two behind, and "at each side were four bearers of reflector torches and an equal number of flambeaux carriers." In 1887, these torchbearers were "mostly colored men" dressed in red robes. In 1890, a newspaper said that they were "chiefly negroes of the steamboat type."

=== Other illuminations ===
In at least two locations in 1878 locomotive headlights lit up the streets. "The Court-house was the center of the grandest illumination along the entire route," being lit "and covered with Chinese lanterns," the St. Louis Evening Post said. "'Red fire' was made and placed behind the fountains and caused the water to take the appearance of being sparkling blood." An electric light in front of Tony Faust's building at Fifth and Elm made the block "as bright as day."

The Daily Commonwealth of Topeka, Kansas, said the 1878 procession, under the

light of various colors thrown upon it, and the glare of illuminated buildings along the route, presented one of the most gorgeous sights imaginable, and elicited almost deafening and continuous applause from the greatest crowd of people ever seen in St. Louis . . . on Bridge Square the most brilliant and beautiful ever seen in the city took place, the air being densely filled with stars of nearly all colors for a height of three hundred feet."

=== Natural gas and calcium light ===
Some business owners "expended large sums of money" in 1878 to furnish lighting in front of their properties by natural gas, using it "as extravagantly as though it were to be found on the streets for nothing," but they found that their attempts were "so eclipsed" by the "gorgeous dazzle" of the VP Parade "that they became disgusted" and vowed not to do it again the next year. Nevertheless, in 1879, "Fifth street was light as day with its many pyramids of gas jets that had taken the place of the every-day lamp-post illuminations. . . . At each end of the Washington avenue corners of Samuel C. Davis & Co.'s dry goods building, a calcium light shone down upon the multitude."

In 1881, a line of gas pipe was run down Fourth Street, "broken only at the cross streets, from which myriads of jets surrounded by white globes poured forth their effulgence. . . . Swung high in the air at [a] distance of about every thirty feet[,] tall branch lights had been placed, which when fully ablaze resembled . . . a row of beautiful trees hung with brilliant lanterns. The effect was magical." Gusts of wind from the river, however, blew out the lights, which were relit by workers with oakum torches. "Taken as a whole, the effect was very brilliant and will long be remembered by the thousands who witnessed it." After the main gas pipe was opened in the early evening, merchants and businessmen along the route were responsible for lighting the gas jets themselves with torches provided by the gas company.

The 1883 parade was held in conjunction with the 23rd St. Louis Fair. Twenty-five thousand globes, nineteen arches, and "miles of gas jets" were newly installed, and "many of the business houses will be brilliantly lighted up by gas and electric lights."

In March 1885, Charles H. Lewis and his wife received $283 from the city for the injuries they had received from the falling of a gas pipe at Broadway and Washington Avenue during the VP Parade.

=== Electricity ===
In 1881, lighting the line of the parade with electric lights suspended from the telegraph poles was discussed but abandoned because, a newspaper report said, "the intense white flames of the electric lamps would interfere with the colored lights." Still, a string of electric lamps were "stretched from the St. Louis Club-house down along Washington avenue to Samuel C. Davis' store on Fifth street." As well, other establishments promised to provide enough electric lights in their vicinities "to turn night into day." And, torch-bearers were "three times as numerous" as they were in previous processions.

In 1894, illuminations were considerably reduced, the rural visitor perhaps being unhappy with the lack of "even the usual number of gas jets and incandescent globes," the Globe-Democrat said, but the floats "and their attendant illuminators had no glare and glitter from street lamps to dim their luster," and the "innovation proved to be a decided success."

The 1903 parade was the first in which the floats, with more than forty thousand mounted electric lights, moved along the streetcar tracks with everything powered by the overhead electric trolley wires. "The pageant will be more clearly seen," The Republic predicted in an advance story. "There will be no dull patches in it. . . . The floats will move much more easily on the streetcar tracks" than they had done before on the asphalt or granite streets. Each float was to be supplied with "300 to 400 incandescent bulbs . . . to produce every effect of lighting that can devised, . . . vivid and full of color." Horses, however, still pulled the floats, "it having been deemed inartistic and impractical to supplant the gallant steeds with buzzing motors," the Post-Dispatch said.

The St. Louis Daily Globe-Democrat noted in 1906 that "The nightly street illumination will remind all who witness its strange and brilliant combination of the wonderful recent advance in lighting the avenues and in rendering the darkness eloquent with various devices. This is one of the triumphs of the new century."

In 1919, a United Railways employee walked behind each wagon, carrying the "trolley rope." The trolley on the Prophet's float was accidentally torn off at 7th and Olive, so it had to be lighted by torches the rest of the way.

== Publications and programs ==
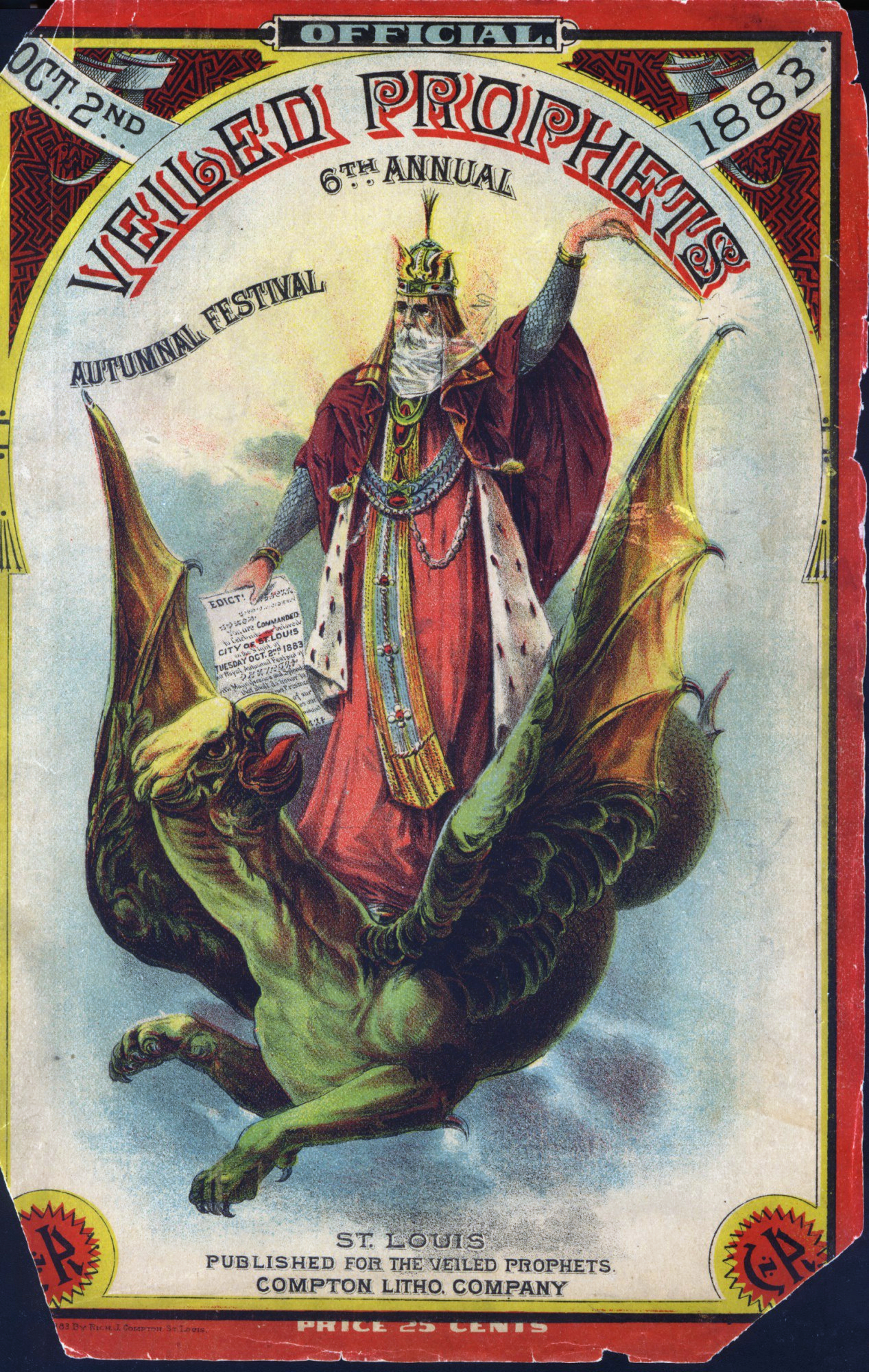
Program cover, 1883

A printed description for the first parade in 1878 was done by Alonzo Slayback, who wrote in his diary that it was "the nearest thing to a stroke of genius that I ever produced." His story, he said, was a "prose poem" which had "brought order and identity out of some very gorgeous but very meaningless representations," the floats in the parade. "For next year, and the year after, and so on for a hundred years . . . the strangers who visit our October fairs can be entertained . . . ."[106]

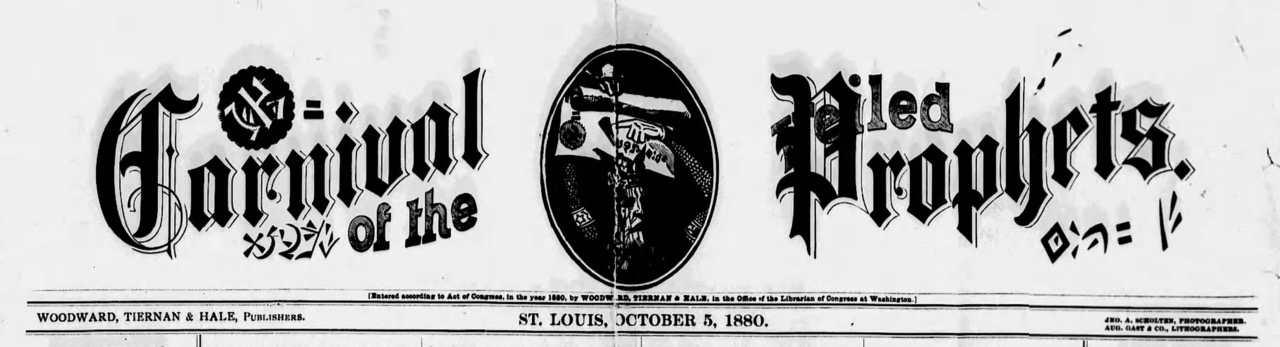
Veiled Prophet's Newspaper - 1880

They published a short newspaper in October for three years(1880-1882). In 1881 and 1882, it was called The Veiled Prophets Sublime Autumnal Festival and was printed by the Compton Lithographic Works, St. Louis. In the "principal illustration," representing the "hall of the Veiled Prophets, . . . Three or four fire-glowing planets wandering in and out among gleaming pillars send a shower of gold down upon the radiant raiment of the assembled Prophets and light up the picture in a manner that makes a circus poster look like a postage stamp."

A lady's program for each ball listed individual dances for the evening, with spaces for the names of men with whom she would dance. In 1890, for example, it was designed in the form of a shield, with a heavy black cord and hook to attach to a coat or a dress, with a miniature pencil.

== Belles, Queens, Debutantes and Matrons of Honor ==
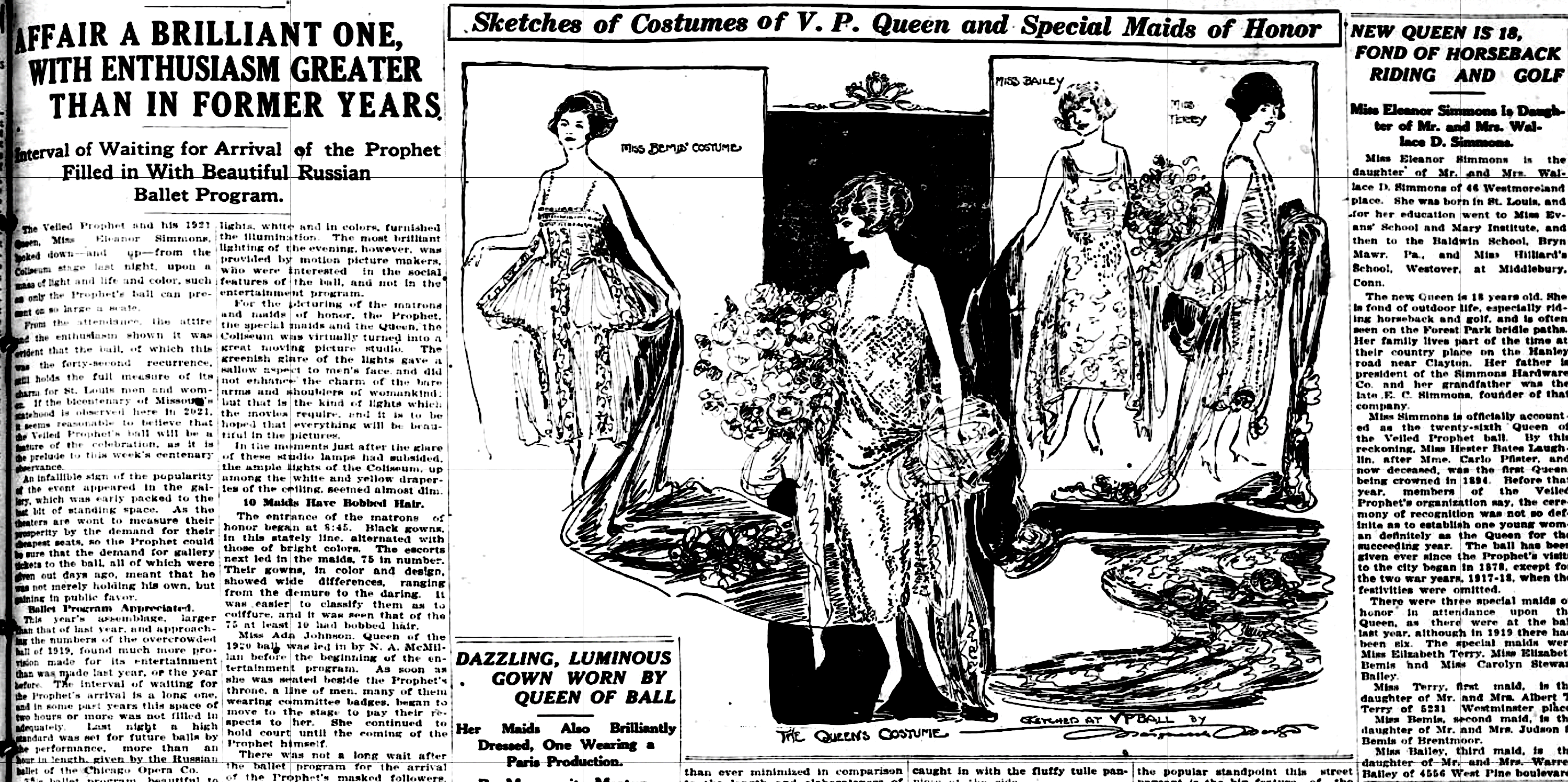
This 1921 clipping, with story and drawings by Marguerite Martyn, represents the saturation newspaper coverage given to fashionable society women at the Veiled Prophet Ball.

=== Belles and the Queens of Love and Beauty ===
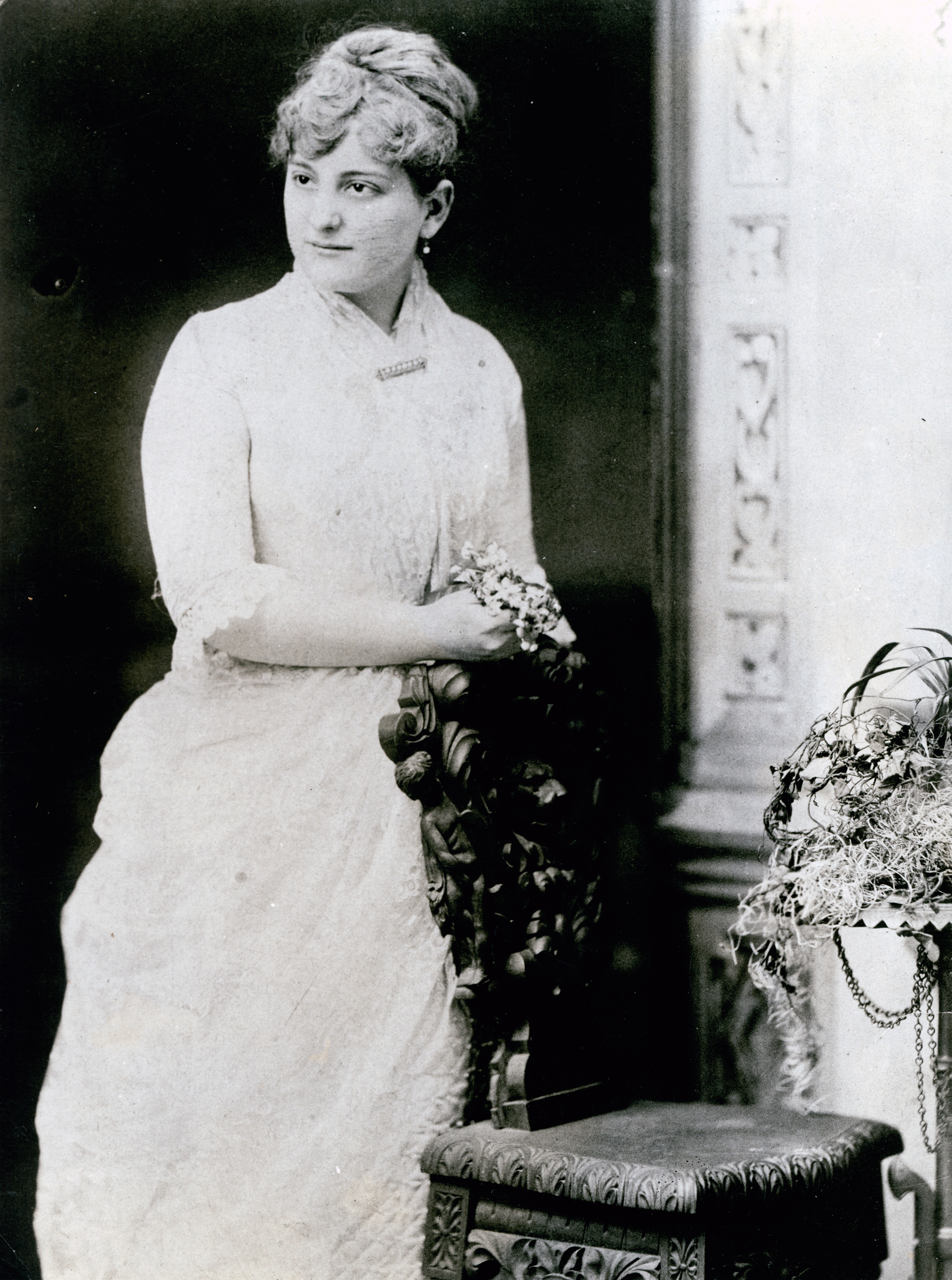
Suzanne Slayback in 1878

The custom of singling out a young woman for special attention began with the first Veiled Prophet Ball in 1878, when Suzanne (Susie) Slayback was chosen by the first Veiled Prophet, John G. Priest, to be the "belle" of the ball at the age of 16. According to a 1958 article in the St. Louis Globe-Democrat, in those earlier times it was "the custom of the Prophet to select a girl for his partner in the first dance at the ball."

In 1894 the title of this honoree was changed to Queen of Love and Beauty. She was to "act as regent" between the Prophet's yearly visits and to "be in charge of the social life of the city."

==== Criticism of former VP Queens ====
In 2021, some Twitter users called actress Ellie Kemper a "KKK princess" because in December 1999, she had been Queen of Love and Beauty at the VP Ball. She responded in a five-slide Instagram apology, beginning:

Hi guys – when I was 19 years old, I decided to participate in a debutante ball in my hometown. The century-old organization that hosted the debutante ball had an unquestionably racist, sexist and elitist past. I was not aware of this history at the time, but ignorance is no excuse. I was old enough to have educated myself before getting involved.

In 2022, Trudy Busch Valentine, a Democratic candidate for the U.S. Senate, apologized in early 2022 for having been the VP Queen in December 1977. She wrote:

"I should have known better, and I deeply regret that my actions hurt others."

=== Maids and Ladies of Honor ===
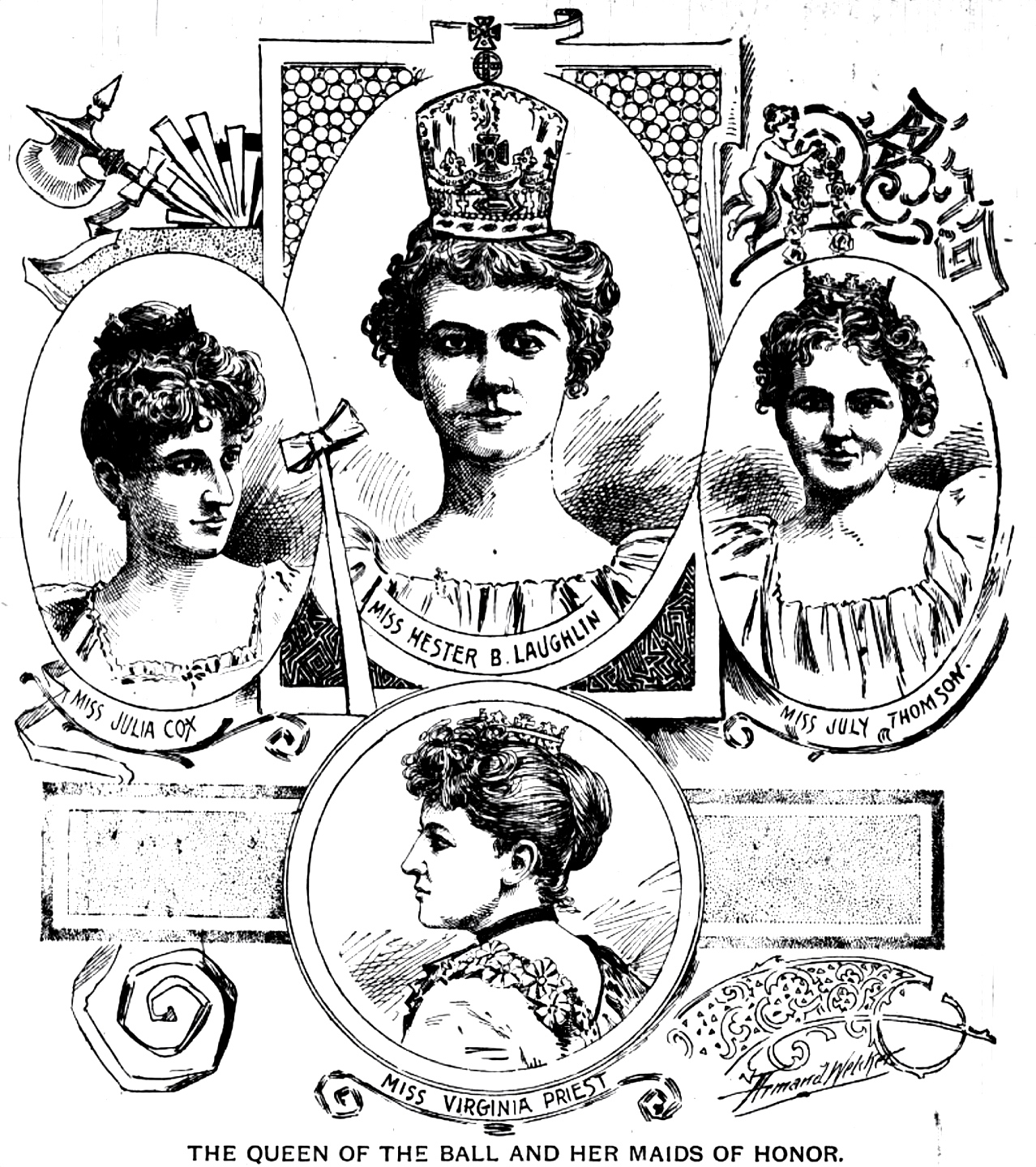
1894 Queen and Court

The Veiled Prophet selected the Queen from among the young women who had been invited as candidates. Beginning in 1894, those not selected were retained as Maids of Honor. A number of married women were known as Ladies of Honor, to act as chaperones. In that year, residents of the wealthy West End, St. Louis, were treated to the appearance of

an unusually elegant carriage, with coachmen and footmen in handsome livery, . . . driving through the prominent thoroughfares and delivering on a silver salver a highly illuminated and gorgeous invitation signed by the Grand Oracle of the Veiled Prophet, . . . appointments of the ladies as Maids of Honor. . . . These invitations have been delivered only to members of the inner circle of the St. Louis One Hundred and are regarded as the most unique and beautiful specimens of engraving and embossing ever seen in the city.

The custom by 1940 was that:

Escorted by members of the Prophet's secret order, the maids promenade the length of the Salle de Bal, pausing to curtsy before the box of the former queens as their names are announced, and then proceed to the royal dais, where, for the duration of the ceremony, they occupy gold and white seats on either side of the Prophet's throne. After the coronation they make their obeisance to their new queen and later join in the general dancing . . . .

=== Married Queen ===
In 1928, Mary Ambrose Smith, who was selected as Queen, was found to have secretly married Dr. Thomas Birdsall days earlier, violating the rule that the Queen of Love and Beauty must be a "maiden." The Post-Dispatch quoted a man "high in the councils of the Veiled Prophet organization," who said: "We have no precedent to guide us. The disclosure is most extraordinary, astounding, to be exact."

In a 1979 interview with the St. Louis Times, Smith recalled how the Veiled Prophet:

gave her traveling money and told her to "begone, don't register at any large hotels, and don't use your real name."... Smith was "made to feel she disgraced her family. None of her friends stuck by her (she was told she could not visit their houses), she was never invited to another VP ball, her picture was removed from the collection of queens' portraits at the Missouri Historical Society, and her name was deleted from the Social Register.

== Invitations ==
The Post-Dispatch wrote in September 1887 that the "Grand Oracle of the Veiled Prophets began the distribution of his favors yesterday, and to-day the mails are burdened with big yellow packages. By 6 o'clock to-morrow evening several thousand people who have been waiting in anxious expectation . . . will have their suspense relieved[, while others] will suffer a grievous disappointment at seeing the postman trot by their door without stopping."

The "handsome and artistic" invitations, matching a different theme for each year, looked like this:

1880 - The Four Seasons. On one side of the engraved bid was a picnic scene, surrounded by representations of spring, summer, autumn, and winter. On the other side were the initials V.P. and four additional scenes — summer in Germany, spring in England, autumn in France, and winter in Russia. To insure that the "strictly personal" invitations would not be transferred at the ball:

Four masked detectives will be present, . . . furnished with a list of all the invitations issued. At the door the admit cards will not be taken up, but a corner will be torn off, and at any time during the ball, if the detectives see any one that they suspicion does not belong there, the party will be required to give his or her name, and show their admit card.

As there was a "mash" [overcrowding] last year, only half the number of invitations will be issued to the coming ball. Of course, everybody wants an invitation, and the number of disappointed ones will be large. The committee, however affable and kind-hearted, cannot include everybody, and those who have had a finger in such matters will readily understand that the position is by no means an easy or enviable one.

1881 - A Day-Dream in the Woodland or Insect Life

Fifteen hundred tickets were printed in Paris, France, with "friends of the order" each able to reserve ten of them, and "a lady counts for as much as a gentleman in the list of names." The tickets were inside a coarse, outside enclosure, an imitation-leather second envelope and, finally, a peagreen envelope, the edge bordered in gold and the center bearing the face of the Veiled Prophet and the initials "V.P." Within it was yet another envelope, with a highly polished gold or silver paten, containing a pink or pale blue card, the former "for ladies" and the latter "for gentlemen." With them were dance cards for the women, "a huge butterfly which is placed in harp-shaped envelopes of transparent linen covered with figures of gold."

1885 - An Arabian Night The invitations for 1885 were in "what seems to be a strong metal box," which, when opened, revealed a satin bag bound with silk, which contained "the coveted bidding." Five scenes from the Arabian Nights were "successfully disclosed by the turning aside of a leaf hinged on a pivot, or the opening of a leaf[,] book fashion. . . . Accompanying . . . were beautifully engraved admission cards to the ball, and the dancing programme."

1888 - Child Lore

The six thousand invitations, again printed in Paris, included "a spectacular view of Mother Goose, on a blue ray-lit sky . . . . The goose is very white and the old woman on its back is very red. She carries a broom in her left hand and in right holds the reins of her feathered steed. There is a friendly grin on the old lady's face . . . ."

Each invitation was inside a separate envelope, "even more gorgeous than its inclosure. Its . . . principal pictorial feature is a regulation fairy queen of the modern stage in a decollete bodice, transparent skirts and ravishing pink tights. A diadem adorns her flowing yellow hair[,] and two rows of pearls shine upon her splendid throat. . . . She is seated on the backs of a pair of flame-tongued, red-tailed dragons, and the sky in the immediate vicinity is blazing with glory."

An enclosed ticket for the dance consisted, according to the same story, "of a "rabbit's foot growing out of a rabbit's head" [see accompanying image].

1902 - From the Discovery of the Mississippi to the World's Fair

The invitation included "a map of the Louisiana Purchase, supported by the palm branch, with intertwined shields of the United States and the Republic of France, [see note] with the Veiled Prophet's seal," along with, "in colors," scenes and incidents in the Louisiana Purchase.

1904 - Art and Architecture

Recipients had to open three boxes, one inside another, to reach the souvenir,

a tray of the new kaiserzin [ pewter ] ware, so popular of late as a material in which . . . may be wrought all the artistic effects possible in silver. . . . It is useful and beautiful either upon my lady's toilet table or upon a gentleman's office desk, for the holding of trinkets or trifles. It is in the shape of a large sea shell, and it rests upon the table on four spherical knobs.

1920

There were two thousand fewer invitations sent out that year, to avoid "the crowding that had so often in the past made balls uncomfortable," the Globe-Democrat reported, but that fact "did not make it any less democratic, for the invitations included all sorts and conditions of worthy St. Louisans."

== Dress requirements and customs ==
=== 19th century ===
The first year of the ball, 1879, "A great many ladies were in full evening dress, while others were attired in calling or reception toilets, and a few, seated, wearing their street suits and bonnets."

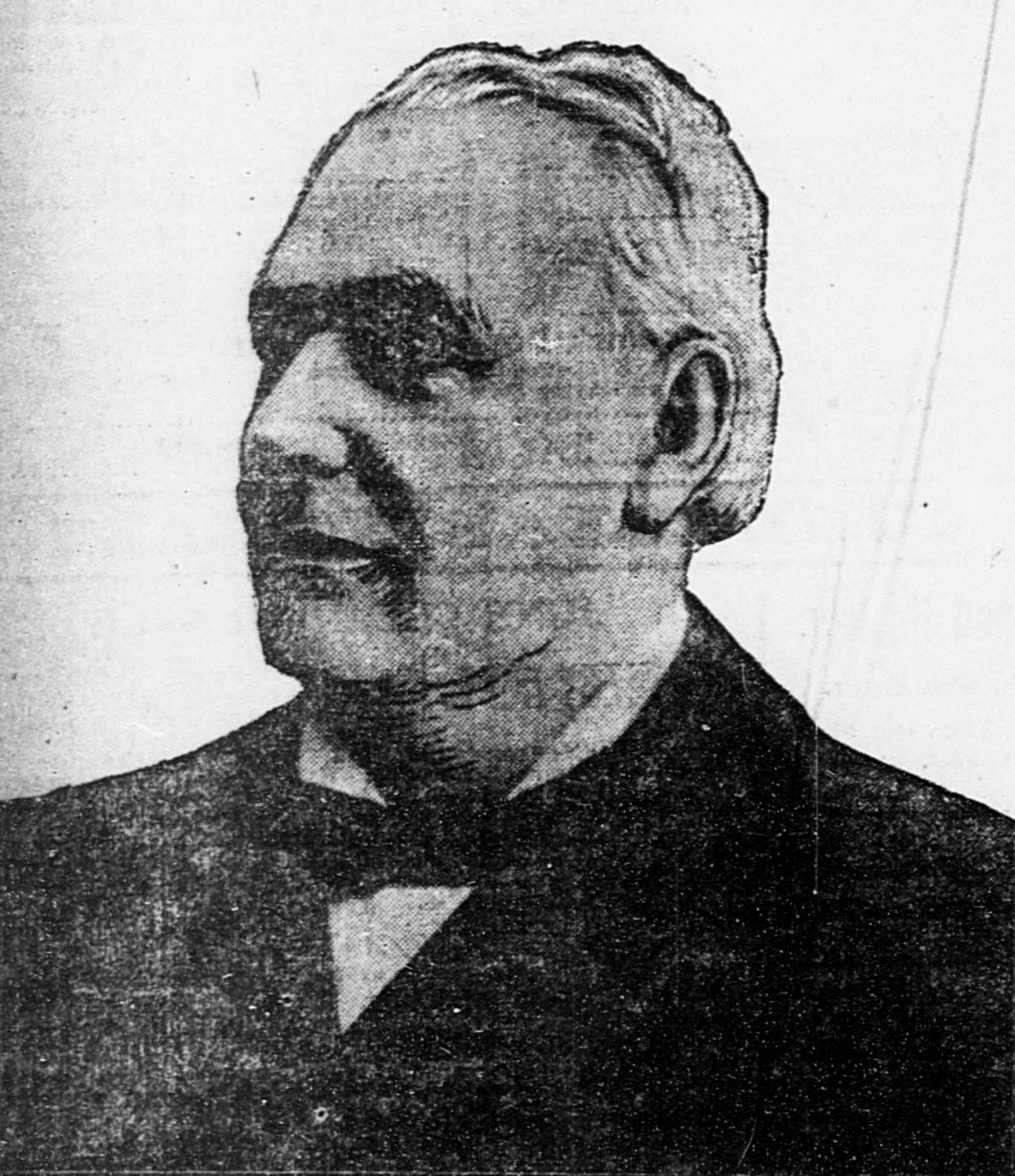
Mayor Ziegenhein in 1902

The rules required "full evening dress" for attendees, which for women meant that "low neck and short sleeves" would not be "insisted upon, but the wearing of hats or bonnets will not be countenanced... it is expected that ladies will appear in an elaborate coiffure." The "orders" that year were that women in hats or bonnets "will be required to go into the gallery [and] . . . will not be permitted to dance."

For men, the rule was swallow-tailed, black broadcloth, or Prince Albert coats, but not "light-colored, bob-tailed or business suits." Military uniforms were okay.

"A peculiar thing" about the ball in 1881, a Kansas City Times reporter averred, is that "the committee lays down a law that no lady in bonnet or gentleman not in full dress shall be admitted." Full dress for men was defined as "Black swallow-tail coat, black low-cut vest, black pants, white cravat and light gloves." Nevertheless, the reporter wrote, "Despite this... ladies were seen on the floor with bonnets. Gentlemen were there in light coats, the tails of which were pinned back, thus making an improvised swallow tail."

St. Louis Mayor Henry Ziegenhein refused to wear a dress suit when he was invited to attend the Veiled Prophet Ball and "welcome" the Veiled Prophet to his city in 1898. He said he had never worn one and never would, preferring a Prince Albert coat (frock coat), which he wore on all state occasions.

In the 1870s and 1880s, a carpet of linen was laid upon the floor for dancing, "to protect ladies' dresses."

=== 20th Century ===
==== 1901–1919 ====
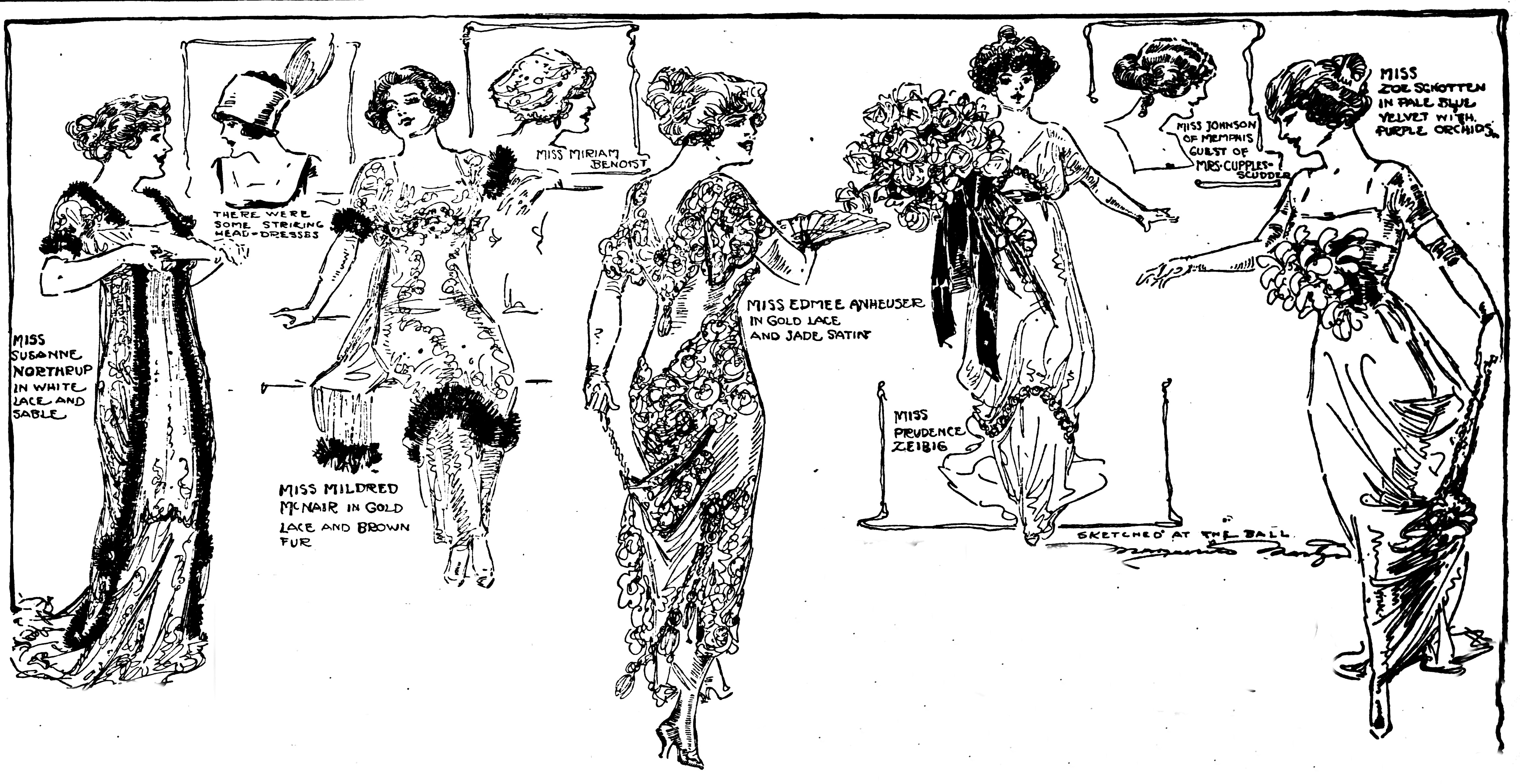

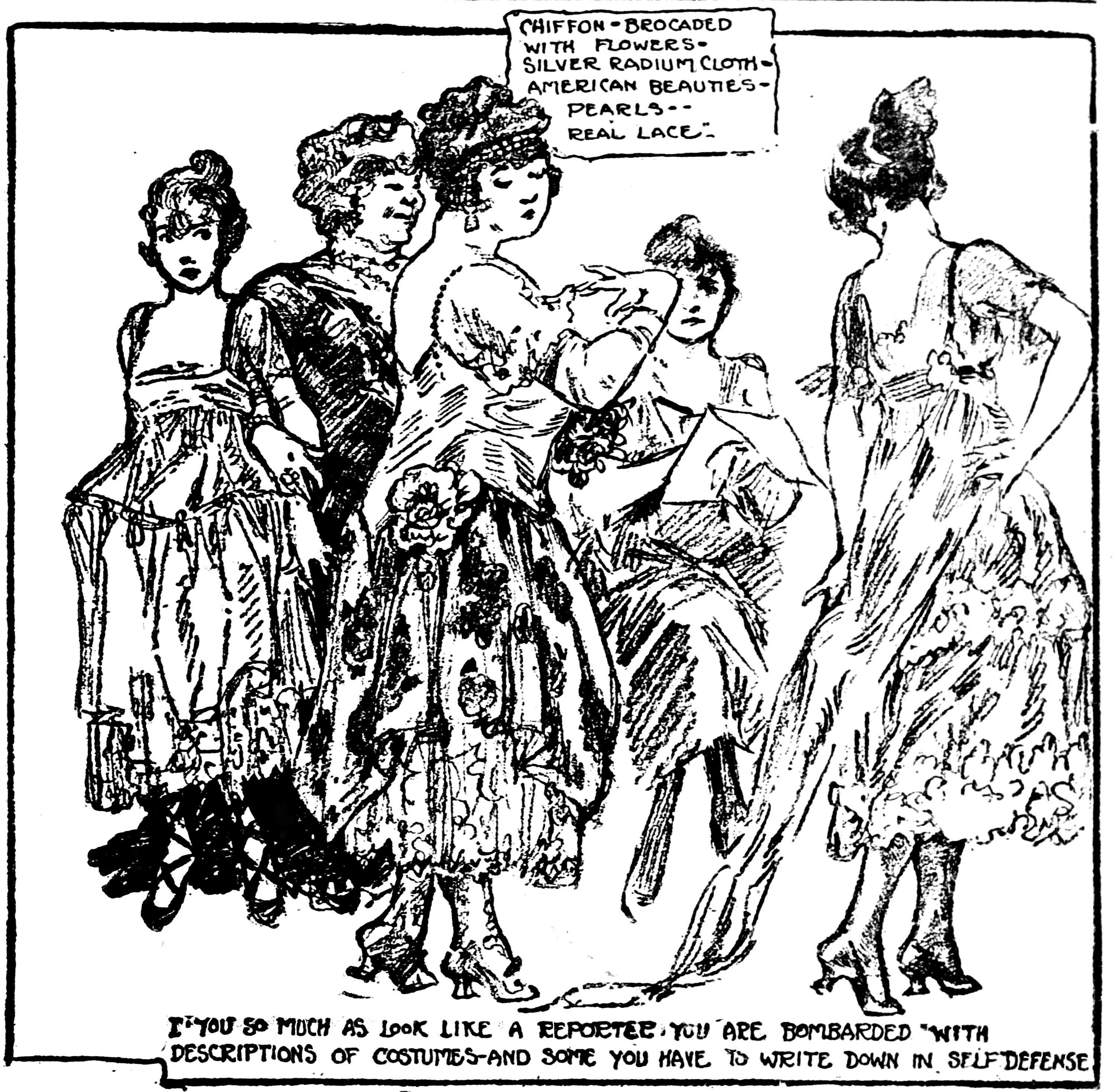
Journalist Marguerite Martyn sketched these Ball attendees in 1911 and in 1916.
Martyn drew herself seated in the right panel.

==== 1920–1934 ====
A Globe-Democrat reporter noted in 1920 that "short gowns and no gloves were the order of the day" for women at the VP Ball that year. "It was like a big reception at which all were friends, and they went about visiting with one another and nodding gayly." In 1921, ten of the seventy-five Maids of Honor wore their hair in a bobbed fashion. Strict dress rules were still in effect in 1930.

==== 1935 and after ====
By 1935, men and women in the "floor seating and standing spaces, the boxes and balcony," were to be in "full evening dress," but gallery viewers were expected only to be "neatly dressed."

In summer 1986, Jennifer Knight, that year's Queen of Love and Beauty, headed a group of her court members in a fund-raising fashion show at Buder Park. The dress code was "sporty Sunday clothes, fun skirts — certainly not blue jeans," spokeswoman Ginny Orthwein said. A Post-Dispatch fashion writer advised in 1992 that for the Veiled Prophet, Fleur de Lis and St. Louis Charitable Foundation balls "white tie" for women can mean "a genuine ball gown, more opulent than most [other] formal attire worn" in St. Louis.

== Ball details ==
=== Ball location and duration ===
The first VP Ball in 1878 was in the "beautiful precincts of the Chamber of Commerce," also known as the Merchants Exchange, the largest hall in the city, with some 1,400 seats. But much of the space was taken up by a rostrum, a fountain, telegraph desks and tiers of seats around the sides.

The ball began after the parade was over and the participants had returned to the dance venue. "The festivities lasted to the early dawn."

In 1889 and 1890 the venue was switched to the Grand Exposition Music Hall, with a gallery of 1,100 seats and a dress circle of 1,400. There, "the Prophets will be able to give a tableau on the stage before the ball, as is done in New Orleans."

In the first part of the 20th century, the ball was held at the St. Louis Coliseum. Beginning in 1936 it took place at the Municipal Auditorium (which had been renamed the Kiel Auditorium) until a lawsuit was brought against the Veiled Prophet organization for shutting down the public auditorium for weeks at a time, arguing that the common taxpayers did not have access to the event. In the 1950s, the Chase Park Plaza Hotel constructed the opulent Khorassan Ballroom specifically to host the annual debutante ball, and the event was formally moved there in December 1975.

=== Bengal Lancers ===
In 1880, "armed attendants" accompanied the presentation of the Veiled Prophet in a ceremonial procession before the Ball. An honor guard for the VP continued around 1922 with uniforms modeled after those of a British first life guard; then, over time, a West Point cadet and, next, a cavalier. In 1935 the men were fitted with a new look: that of a Bengal lancer of India, with a royal blue turban, a scarlet tunic, white breeches, white gauntlets and black jackboots with silver spurs. The Globe Democrat reported that year:

The turban is striped with yellows and reds with a green center stripe; each color representing a religion of these fighting men. The green signifies Mohammedanism, while the other colors stand for the various other Eastern faiths.

In 1930, the team had been costumed "in uniforms of the period of the Restoration in England," with "quaint arms in keeping with the costumes."

Each year, the guard performed an exhibition drill before the introduction of the Prophet to the assemblage. As time passed, their movements drew laughter:

(1937) The Prophet's Guard, still garbed as Bengal lancers, began squads-righting and forming perfect fronts. The laughter which greeted them . . . must have been caused either by their [fake] black beards or their bamboo lances, which, when held defensively before them, caused some of the spectators to ask whether the fishing was good.

(1949) Another highlight was offered by the pompously correct Bengal Lancers, who won applause and some deliberately provoked titter when their military maneuvers . . . went awkwardly awry. They seemed to enjoy the few bobbers perhaps more than their 10,000 spectators.

In 1960, the Lancers rode horseback during the Parade, just ahead of the Prophet's float.

By 1986, laughter was expected, with Patricia Rice of the Post-Dispatch observing that the Lancers'

antics begin and end every Veiled Prophet Ball, setting its tone, and last night . . . the bearded, turbaned lancers once again kept the 1,500 guests laughing. Such fun is just one of the ways in which the guests are reminded that the ball is primarily a party, and that nothing must be taken too seriously.

=== Grand March and Quadrille ===
The first ball, in 1878, began with a quadrille of costumed men from the parade and the women who awaited them. After two dances, the first being J. S. Bach's Royal Quadrille, the men retired to replace their disguises with formal wear for the rest of the evening. The next year, 1879, the Veiled Prophet and retinue entered the room and proceeded to execute a grand march, followed by a quadrille with "fair ones of the earth as partners." In 1890 the music was the Coronation March by Giacomo Meyerbeer. The Royal Quadrille was on the program as late as 1921.

=== After coronation ===
Before 1915, the newly crowned Queen was taken by family and friends to a fashionable hotel for a "light cotillion," or light refreshments, and then escorted home. In that year, the supper was supplanted by an elaborate party, first at the St. Louis Country Club, then over time at the Chase Hotel and next the Jefferson Hotel (for 27 years).

Gus O. Nations, chief prohibition agent in St. Louis, announced in 1922 that his agents would patrol hotels "where guests at the Veiled Prophet Ball will congregate" after their departure from the dance. If liquor comes "within the gaze of a prohibition enforcement agent," the bearer could be arrested under the Volstead Act, he warned.

In 1926, as in "past years" and after "a ceremony of allegiance to the new Queen," the custom for her and some others was to leave the venue "and spend the rest of the evening in hotel ballrooms or dining rooms." In 1940, twenty-two young men were invited to attend such a supper dance at the Hotel Jefferson (St. Louis, Missouri); with a blue carnation in their lapels, they would "have the privilege of dancing with any of the ladies present whether or not they have been formally introduced."

=== Memorabilia ===
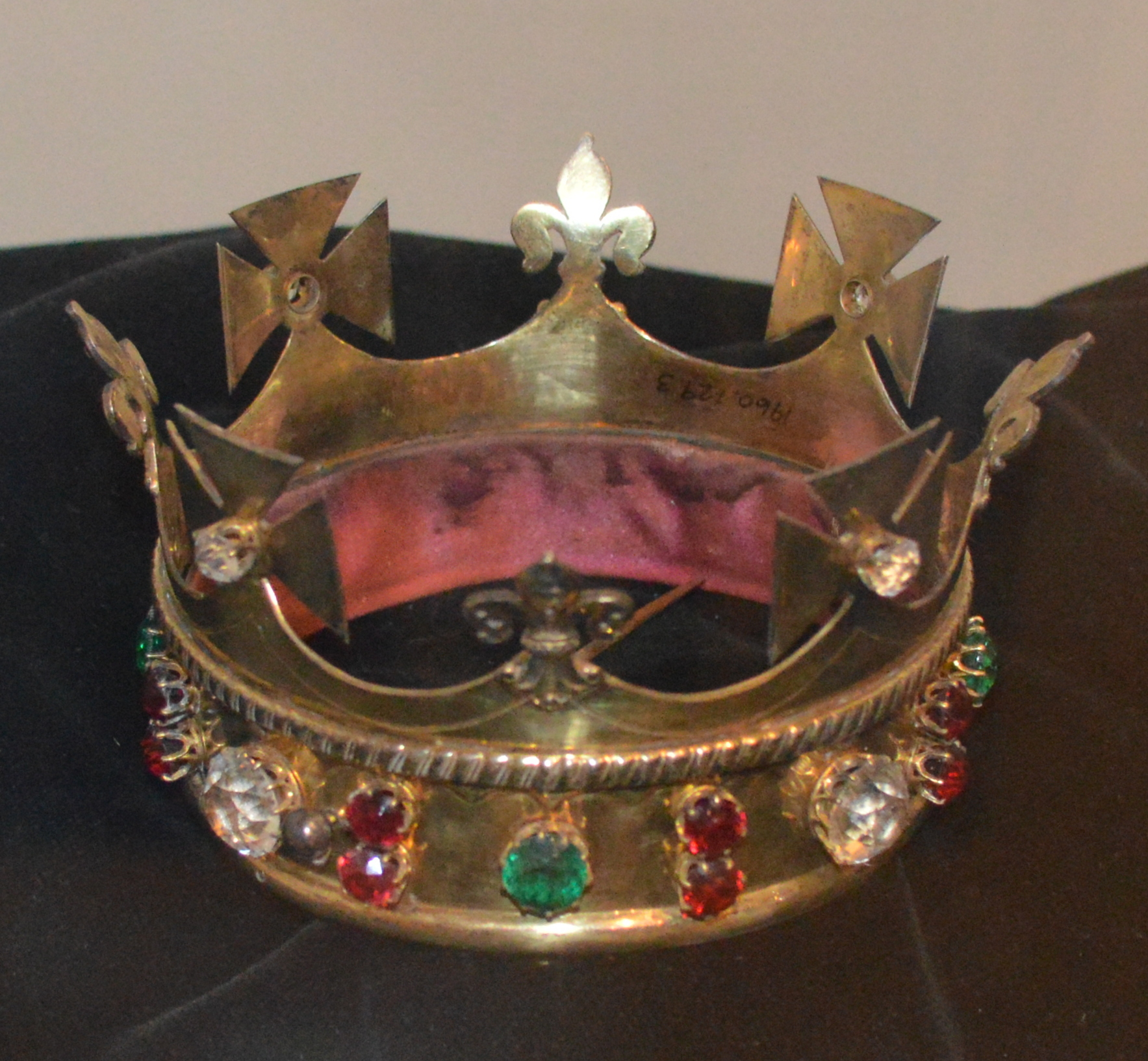
1894: Silver-and-washed-gold special maid's crown, with green-and-red inset jewels, adorned with 14 four-pointed crosses separated by fleur-de-lis, made by Mermod, Jaccard & Co.

The Matrons of Honor in 1920 received as gifts black moiré bags lined with white, with clasps and trimmings of gold. The Maids of Honor received gold bar pins embellished with designs in filagree.

The Queen in 1930 was given a diadem set with 71 diamonds, two pearls and two sapphires, with the crown designed so it might be removed from the platinum bandeau and worn as a brooch or pendant. An 8-inch plume was of spun silver. The Maids got coronets, "small-scale duplicates" of the one worn by the Queen, with only 51 diamonds.

In 2018, two "jewel-encrusted" gold and silver Veiled Prophet tiaras, worn by a Special Maid in 1894 and the Queen of Love and Beauty in 1896, were stolen from the Missouri History Museum. They were never recovered.

=== Children and teen events ===
"Miniature" Veiled Prophet balls were scheduled with children, an early one in May 1936 at the Independent Evangelical Church and another at Greeley Presbyterian Church in October 1938, with the crowning of a "Queen." A Prophet and Queen were crowned at Lowell School in 1940. The first after World War 2 was at the Zion Methodist Church in June 1946. Villa Duchesne High School held Miniature VP events both before and after the war.

== Notable guests ==
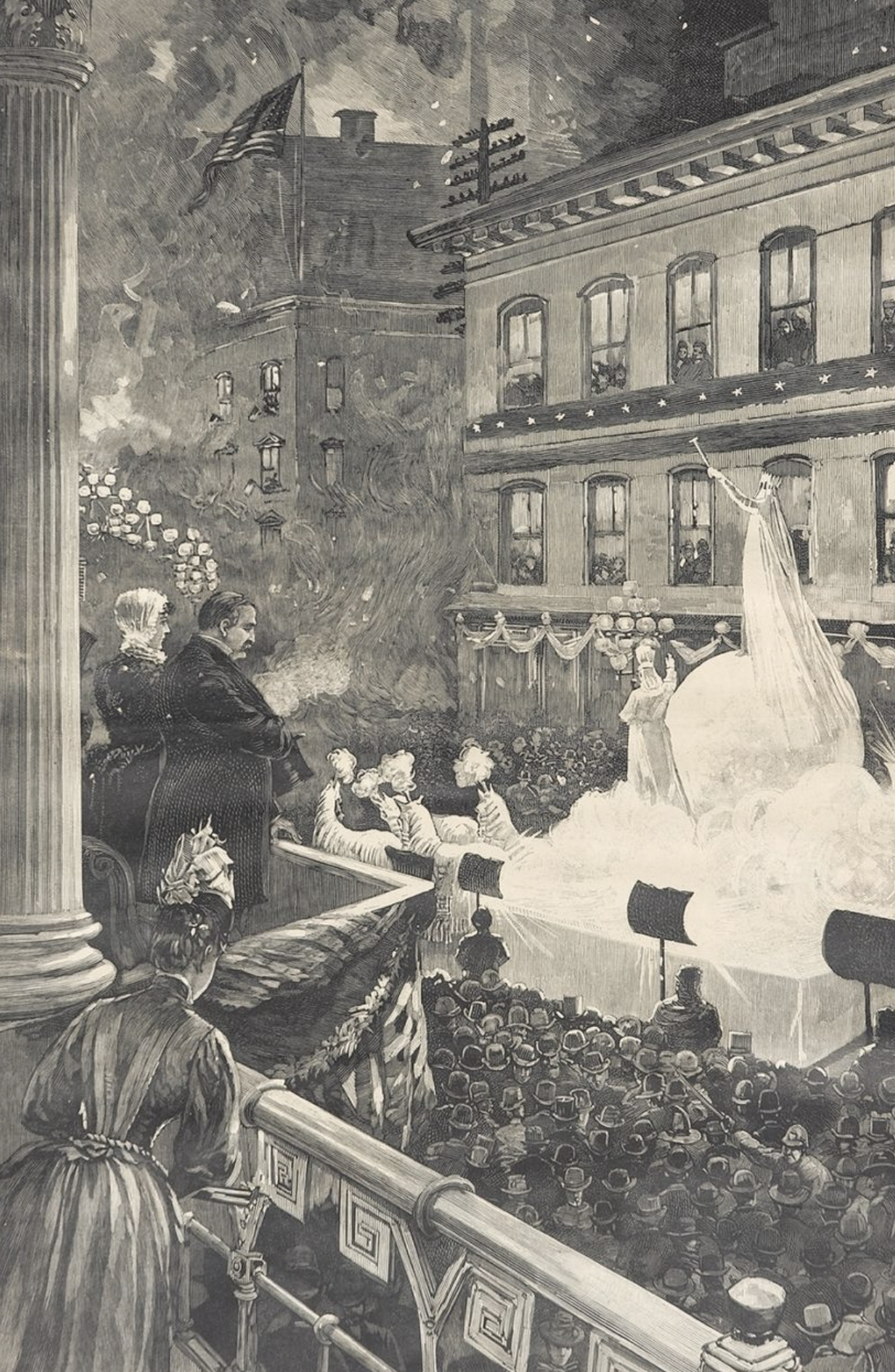
President and Mrs. Grover Cleveland watch the 1887 VP Parade.

President Grover Cleveland and his wife, Frances Folsom, attended in 1887 and Margaret Truman, the author and daughter of President Harry S. Truman, in 1969. At the former, the number of invitations to "perhaps the most exclusive ball of them all" had been "somewhat limited" and the guest list "carefully scrutinized," the St. Louis Republic recalled in 1900.

In 1893, sixty representatives from 34 countries or colonies exhibiting at the World's Fair in Chicago arrived by train and were escorted in carriages to the Southern Hotel. They were feted at a dinner, witnessed the parade, and taken to the Ball. The next day featured a tour of St. Louis sights.

The governors of fifteen U.S. states participated in the annual VP festivities in 1907. It was the largest number of state executives ever assembled up to that time in one city. They met with President Theodore Roosevelt and accompanied him on a voyage down the Mississippi River.

Poet Edgar Guest and wife Ellen attended the 1921 ball. Guest authored a poem titled "The Veiled Prophet."

Robert Wadlow, the tallest person in record history, of nearby Alton, Illinois, was a guest in 1937, attracting crowds.

== Other notable incidents and activities ==
=== Lawsuit ===
John G. Priest

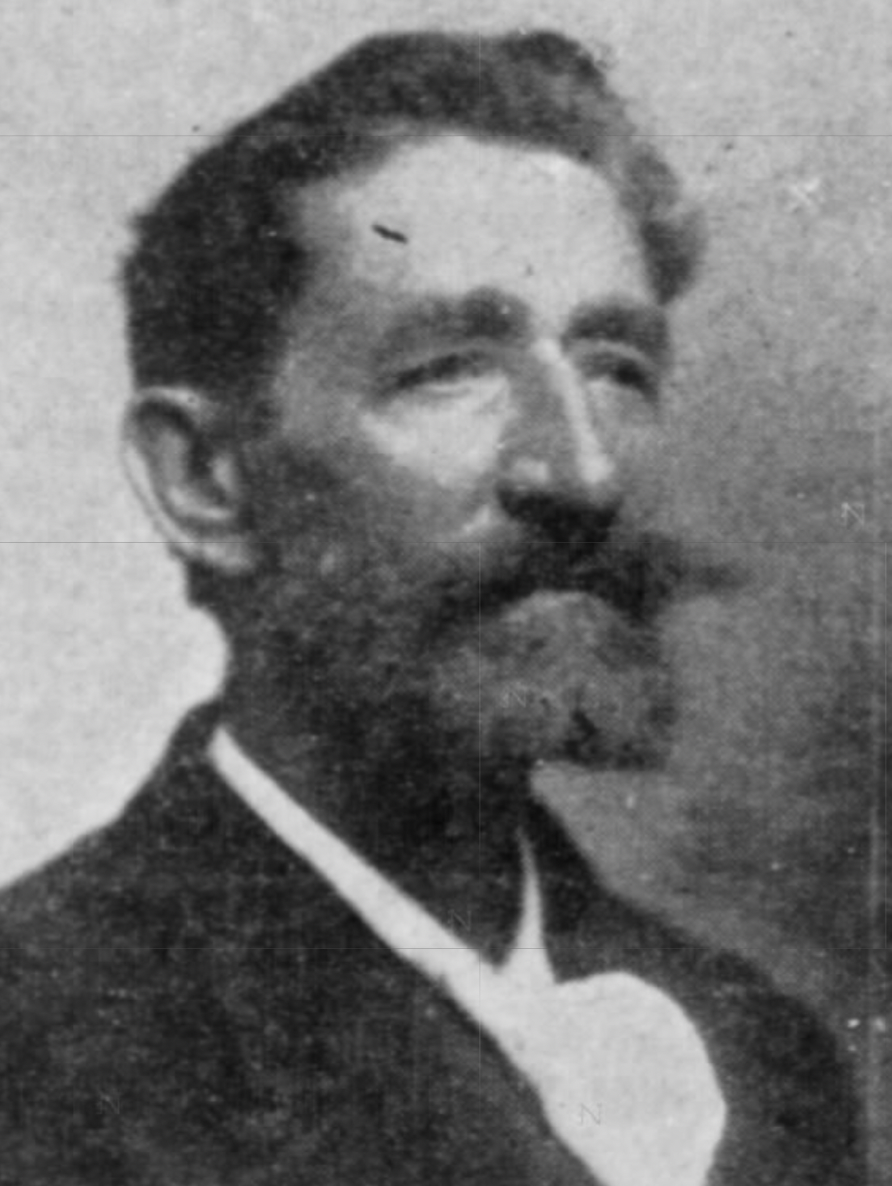
George Soulie

In 1879, George Soulie, who had been living in New Orleans engaged in work on the annual Mardi Gras celebration, sought to do similar work for the second Veiled Prophet Parade in St. Louis. He was placed in touch with businessman John G. Priest, known as a kind of "boss" Prophet. The two signed a contract for Soulie "to paint, decorate, and fix up generally in first-class style twenty-one chariots, or floats" for $630. He worked for three weeks, then was discharged by Superintendent Daniel E. Carroll.

Because the Prophets were supposed to be nameless, "every effort" was made to keep the matter quiet, but Soulie filed suit against Priest, president; Frank Galennie, secretary; Daniel Carrol, superintendent; Charles E. Slayback and Preston T. Slayback. The Daily Globe Democrat reported that after "the indignant artist threatened to reveal all he knew concerning the Prophets and their identity," a "consultation of the high-muck-a-mucks of the V.P.'s was held," they offered $200, Soulie withdrew the suit, "the bounced artist promised to remain true to his plighted word not to squeal, and the awful mystery which surrounds the Prophets remains as impenetrable as before."

=== Courthouse Square ===
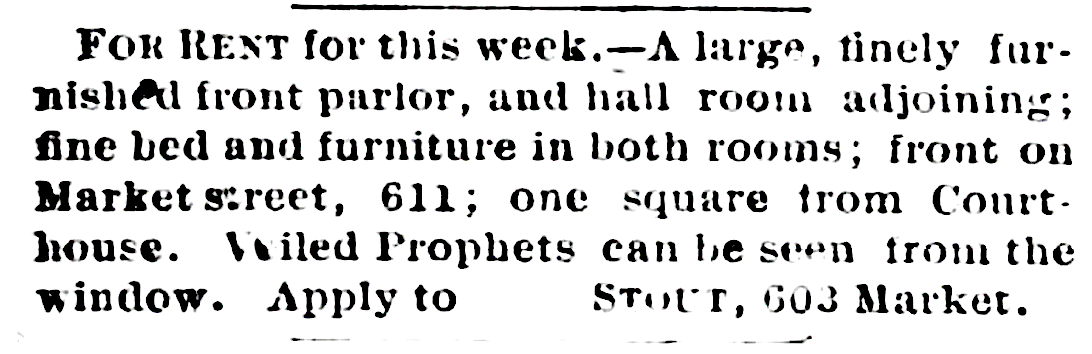
Advertisement in the St. Louis Post-Dispatch for a suite of rooms overlooking the second Veiled Prophet parade, 1879

1879. In the second year of the pageant, the Post-Dispatch reported that the "dazzling display" would cost some seventy thousand dollars, that "seats are being erected at every available corner, and [that] fabulous prices are being paid for rooms along the proposed route. . . . At the Court-house the grand procession will come to a halt and there will be a splendid display of fire works."

The paper reported that "The corner grass plots in the Court-house square have been boarded over and will, it is said, accommodate 3,500 people just at the very turning point in the procession. . . . Fire-works will be displayed at frequent intervals, and the fiery shower from the dome of the Court-house . . . will be one of the grandest sights ever seen by any public."

But, according to the Post-Dispatch, that venture "created a great deal of dissatisfaction and discussion as to the right of the city to allow the public square to be used for a private enterprise." Leslie Moffett, a member of the Board of Police Commissioners, "understanding that some trouble might ensue to the police, owing to the general popular opinion that the people had a right to the Court-house square and might try to force their way into the enclosing" tried to find out who was behind the idea. Contractor E.C. Simmons responded that the seats were "for the benefit of the Veiled Prophets" and that they were "not a private enterprise or speculation in any sense whatever." The tickets were on sale for a dollar each in a stand at a local department store.

The Post-Dispatch added:

The police authorities decline to say what they will do about protecting the seats, so that there is a good deal of doubt about what will occur should the mob rush in and take possession. . . . In this connection it may be stated that the hackmen who stand around the Court-house square, having been requested to vacate the place tonight in order not to obscure the view of the occupants of seats in the court yard, refuse to do so, saying the city gives them permission to stand around the square, and they will not forego it for the accommodation of those who purchase tickets to the inclosures.

Further dissension arose when it was reported that Mayor Henry Overstolz and city officials would view the pageant from a room in the courthouse, thus "controlling the Court-house" on the evening of the parade. Overstolz countered that he had simply "asked Judge [Amos Madden] Thayer for a window in his court-room, and he gave me his private room. I merely suggested that the invitations be extended by the heads of the apartments [departments?] so that the right parties will assemble there, as there are a number of valuable papers in the building. All sorts of rumors are flying about."

On the evening of this second parade, a "stream of lights, red and blue, burst forth upon the cornice of the Court-house . . . . A flight of pigeons . . . sprang out of their suddenly illuminated nests, and fled from their time honored homes in dismay. . . . A cataract of flame [fireworks] flowed down the ashen-colored roof of the dome . . . [looking like] a flood of molten lava."

1894. The courthouse steps "looked like a giant anthill" they were so jammed with people.

=== Tableaux ===
In 1883 the organization began a series of tableaux, which was "not to be an exclusive affair, nor to be confined to the members of the Veiled Prophets. . . . Any person, of respectable character" could send for tickets, which were limited so that they should "not fall into the hands of improper or disreputable characters." Seats at the Olympic Theater were five dollars each, and there would be "no discrimination." In addition to the tableaux, musical attractions were on the bill. There would be no requirement for "full dress."

In conjunction with the 1889 removal of the VP Ball from the Merchants Exchange to a new site at the Music Hall, the program was changed that year from a March and Veiled Prophet's Quadrille to "a series of magnificent tableaux" with "elegantly costumed" participants. The tableaux, with scenery and costumes echoing the theme of the parade floats, continued at least until 1890.

=== Mexican visitors ===
In 1898, St. Louis was one stop for a large group of visitors on tour from Mexico, and Mrs. Otto F. Forster of St. Louis arranged for the women of that group to be "given an insight into the high social life" of the city, but she could not find "enough society women who can speak Spanish to form a reception committee." From the local Latin-American Club she received a list of women who could speak the language, but, as the Post-Dispatch reported, "it didn't suit. The ladies were all stenographers and probably not one of them figured as a maid of honor at a Veiled Prophet's Ball or acted as a lady patroness at a swell function. They were all nice and good, no doubt, Mrs. Forster argued, but they didn't represent what is conceded to be society in St. Louis."

=== Rain delays ===
The second parade and ball were postponed for one day in 1879, until Wednesday, October 7, because of a "miserable, penetrating and thoroughly unpleasant rain." The St. Joseph (Missouri) Gazette said: "The interest in this affair is simply amazing. Excursion trains on all the railroads leading into the city have been crammed to excess all day[,] and not less than forty thousand people came into the city."

=== Crowding ===
- 1878: Onlookers filled every available viewing niche. From the windows of the Shorb & Boland stationers on Washington Avenue, for example, they "stretched their bodies far out, at the risk of falling to the sidewalk."
- 1879: The streets "were thronged to such a degree that at times the procession was obliged to halt until the mounted police force and company of cavalry . . . could make an opening in the dense crowd. Every window and doorstep was filled to its utmost capacity. . . ." Theaters halted their performances as the parade passed through the streets fronting them, like a production of H.M.S. Pinafore at the Mercantile Library Hall.
- 1882: Many thousands arrived via Mississippi River steamer in 1882, the Post-Dispatch said. Under the headline "THE GREAT JAM," it reported that:

The largest number of people who ever congregated within the limits of the city has arrived within the past few days. The hotels are crowded to their utmost capacity, from three to ten persons being crowded into every bed-room, while the halls and parlors are filled with cots closely packed together. . . . The Union depot was a perfect jam all day. Such a crowd never was seen . . . before at any time . . . . All the railroads were running special trains, many of them coming in by sections, being too long to be drawn by one or two engines.

- 1890: The Post-Dispatch reported that:

Every express wagon, furniture van and grocery wagon was out for the evening and on the improvised seats were motley crowds. The colored [African-American] driver had his family and friends there and made a profit by making room for a few eager sight-seers . . . . What a motley crowd it was, to be sure, but a very orderly one.

- 1908: A new system of "pay as you enter" streetcar service was put to the test in handling VP commuters. Women clad in ballroom gowns had to wait on rear platforms while their escorts looked for the small change in their full-dress suits and then they all had to push their way through narrow swinging entrance doors. Women who had taken their children to see the parade were forced to stand on street corners while others, "more active and less encumbered, pushed and fought their way into the [street]cars."

=== Reaction of onlookers ===
1881: A "gang of roughs" pelted the floats with mud and stones. On the other hand, during the same parade "Several young ladies in the windows of 1630 Pine" who attracted the attention of men on one of the floats "received quite a pelting at their hands with nuts and other missiles."

In every window of all the residences and stores . . . were groups of men, women and children, crooking their necks and straining their eyes. . . . Seated on boxes, barrels, benches, chair; perched on the rails of fences and the roofs of houses; grouped on balconies, gathered on door-steps and sitting astride the branches of trees . . . were the spectators of every class, age and condition.

1883: The Post-Dispatch reported that "The large and overwhelming majority" of the crowd were . . . visitors to the city who were enjoying their first holiday since last Christmas." This over,

they repaired to the beer saloons, the restaurants, the theaters and hotels and proceeded to 'round off' the occasion in such manner as their tastes dictated. A few indulged too freely in their ardent devotions to Bacchus and were nearly corralled in the police wagons . . . very little rowdyism was indulged in, such as there was . . . being . . . for the most part, the boisterous good humor of the 'smart Aleck' era of a rising generation. A few boys, lined up in 'hand to shoulder' fashion, occasionally forced their way through the crowds of women and children, but this rudeness was received good-naturedly.

1884: At Broadway and Fourth Streets "there was a mob . . . of the most unruly character. A dozen policemen fought them back, but they crowded up to the very wheels of the floats."

1911: According to Marguerite Martyn in the St. Louis Post-Dispatch:

The slapstick, so long indispensable to low comedy, found a new use among the crowds . . . they used the slapstick to the extreme embarrassment of many women. The carnival spirit, for the most part tempered by high good humor, at times verged on rowdyism. Girls used a stick ripped with feathers to tickle the faces of young men, and they retaliated vigorously with the slapstick.

1920: "Ordinarily reserved young ladies used the 'Coney Island ticklers,' sold by countless vendors, upon the chins and faces of every young man who came within an arm's length," the Globe-Democrat reported. "And the favor was reciprocated."

1926: Slapsticks, rolled newspapers and feather ticklers were used "to tease and torment." Women reported dresses torn and hair rumpled. Police confiscated more than a hundred slapsticks and arrested six vendors. Chief Joseph A. Gerk said: "I am opposed to the use of slapsticks and heartily approve of the beating of one man who used a slapstick on a woman." He thought some of the enthusiasm stemmed from the excitement of the World Series being played that week in St. Louis — the Cardinals against the Yankees.

1930s: Some onlookers used pea-shooters, rocks and other missiles against the floats. Confectioners' shops stocked the pea-shooters in anticipation of the parade, according to Robert Tooley, who identified himself as VP "den superintendent" in that era. Pea-shooters were again active in 1947, and in that same year "the new plastic bubbles" were evident.

1937:"For the first time in years," the Globe-Democrat reported, "great volumes of paper were dropped from windows." Some of it was ignited when it came in contact with sparks from trolley wires. Downtown merchants played safe either by "boarding up windows or lining the window sills with boards in which nails were upended" to prevent crowds from pushing against plate-glass windows. "Youths with bean shooters were active, as always."

1966: A judge sentenced an 18-year-old man to sixty days in the city workhouse after convicting him of throwing stones at a police car during the weekend VP Parade.

=== Mishaps ===
- 1884: A witch character in Float No. 10 "spilled some of the alcohol that was used as fuel in their caldron, and in a moment it was on fire." Attendants stamped out the blaze, and the witches handed the cans of alcohol to them.

=== Street conditions, police, and traffic ===
- 1879: "Vehicles of all kinds swarmed in and began to block up the crossings so that the police were kept busy . . . making room for the pedestrians. . . . By 8 o'clock the street cars could hardly move . . . ."
- 1881: The VP organization made out a route for the procession and handed it over to Street Commissioner Turner, who, said the Post-Dispatch, would "patch up" the streets "so that the floats may not be stalled and the torch-bearers may not go over a precipice every half block." On parade night, "The vacant lots and all the cross streets . . . were closely packed with wagons, carriages, etc., in which the occupants were standing and sitting."
- 1890: In advance of the parade, the Globe-Democrat said that "A strong cordon of mounted police will act as a skirmish line to clear the crowded streets, while a similar force will follow in the wake to preserve the rear floats . . . . [They will] prevent the hilarity of the occasion from degenerating into stone-throwing . . . ."
- 1893: The "entire police force" was on duty, required to serve "from fifteen to eighteen hours, or about the same time as on election days," an officer assigned to march behind each float, each man "provided with a long cane." Two were on horseback at the rear of the procession, to "keep advertising schemers from following." Police "in citizens' clothes" mingled with the crowds and watched for pickpockets.
- 1894: Vehicles included "the elegant barouche, drawn by a handsome pair [of horses]," "the ash cart dragged along by some poor equine," businessmen's and farmers' wagons, baker wagons, milk carts, drays, carriages, omnibuses, "and one enterprising malt [beer and ale] dealer had transformed his immense vehicle into an observation tower for a jolly crowd of young men and girls." Motormen, conductors and passengers climbed to the top of parked streetcars to watch. . . . It was really a question of which was the happier lot [the Globe-Democrat said] — "the rich laden with diamonds and silks entering the grandest festival of the year or the folks from the country who milked the cows for supper and barely had time to get the straw off their bonnets before they were right there looking on."
- 1906: The parade that year would feature "a great array of decorated vehicles, including automobiles, whose rapid rise and multiplying uses are one of the sensations of the day."
- 1914: Again, the "entire police department" of 1,400 men was on duty "to prevent rowdyism on the streets and arrest any suspicious character." Patrols were assigned to residential areas to guard against burglaries. A city ordinance forbade the use of confetti and slap sticks.
- 1919: The St. Louis Star reported that "never before were so many automobiles massed in the downtown district. It took virtually the entire police force to handle the traffic. Owners of trucks permitted their use by employees, who fitted them with seats for their families and friends." Autos with men and women in evening attire, bound for the ball at the Coliseum, had the right of way.
- 1930: Rules were changed to make egress for automobiles easier after the dance, "so as to occasion the owner the least possible difficulty and delay in getting out of his parking place, and to enable chauffeur-driven cars to reach the door of the Coliseum very quickly after being called. In former years there have been twenty-three [telephone] call stations for cars and of late years only eight or ten . . . have been used because . . . so many guests drive their own cars."
- 1940: In an editorial, the St. Louis Star-Times castigated city officials for not having provided "a modern, scientific pattern" for coping with the 410,000 people who flocked to see the VP Parade, when twelve thousand VP Ball attendees were receiving "first class" traffic arrangements, with special routes set aside and parking places "abundantly provided." The editorial went on: "Failure to provide a modern, scientific pattern for coping with the traffic . . . smacks of indifference and official inertia or a perverse distaste for progress."
- 1941: Things got better in 1941, with every street intersection manned by one to six officers, and when the larger part of the parade had passed, police cars shuttled the patrolmen to the head of the procession for duty.

== Gallery of illustrations ==
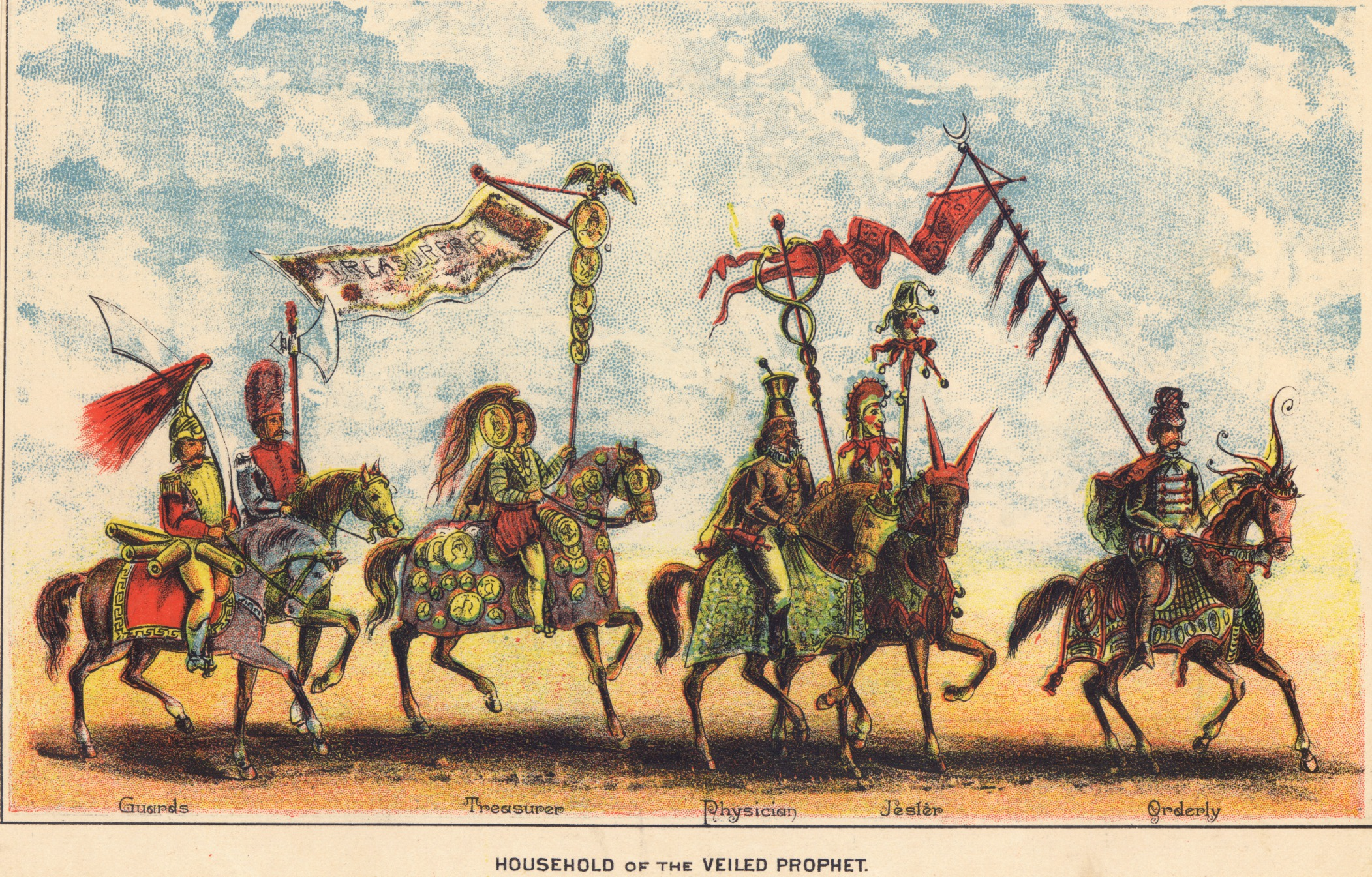
Missouri History Museum. "Household of the Veiled Prophet." From Veiled Prophets Sixth Annual Autumnal Festival, October 2, 1883

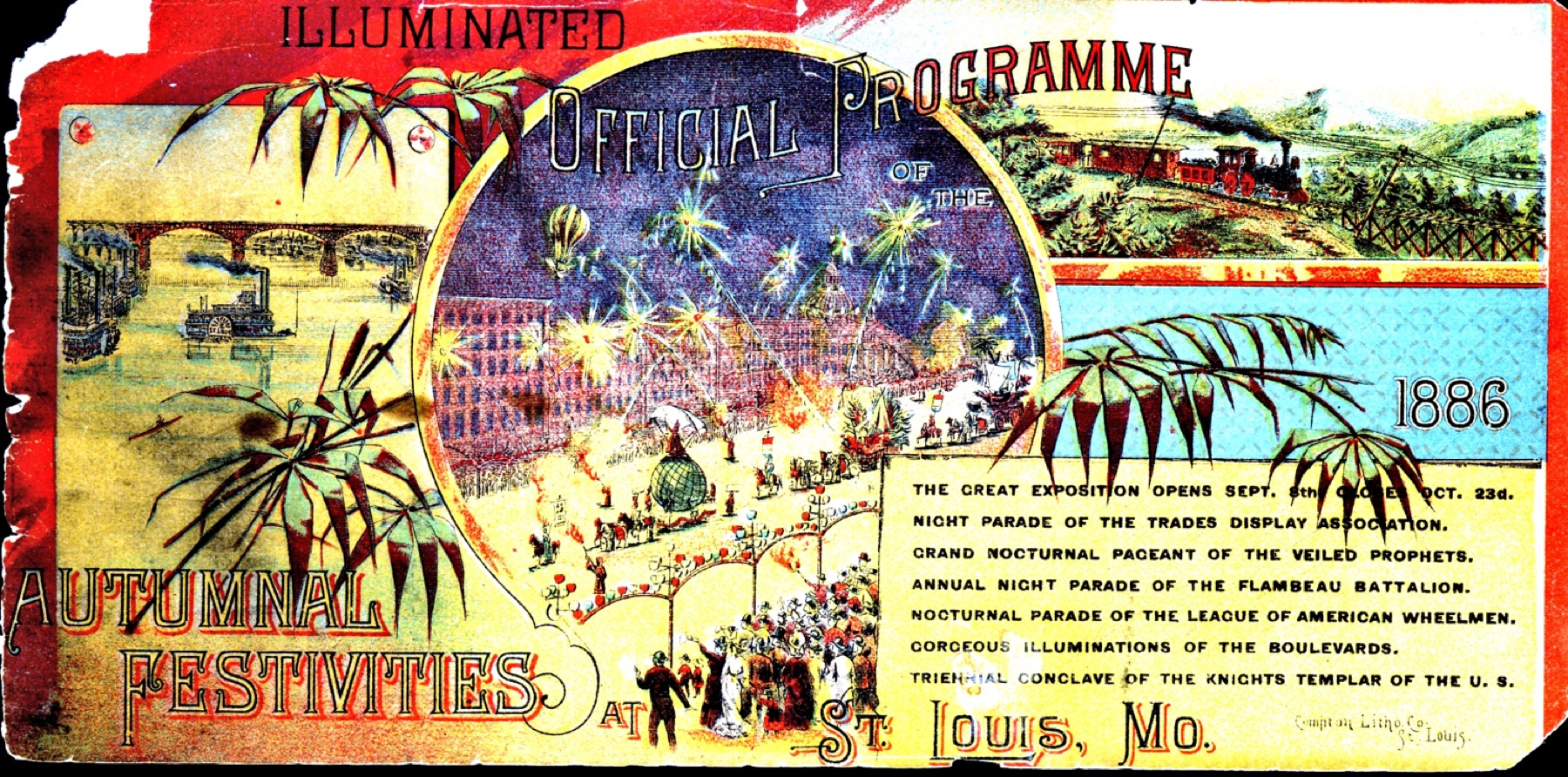
Program, 1886

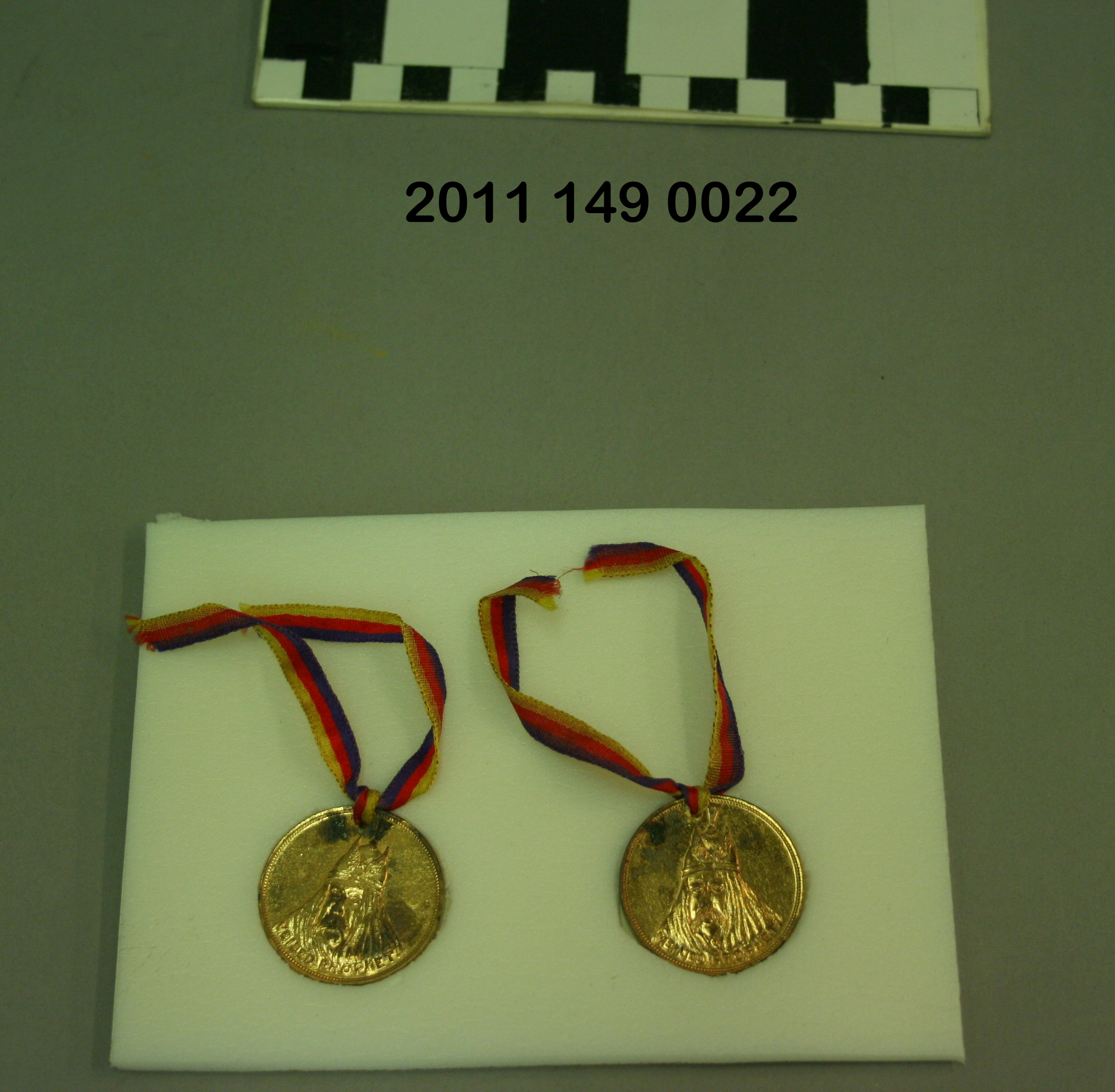
Two medallions with Veiled Prophet images, 1902

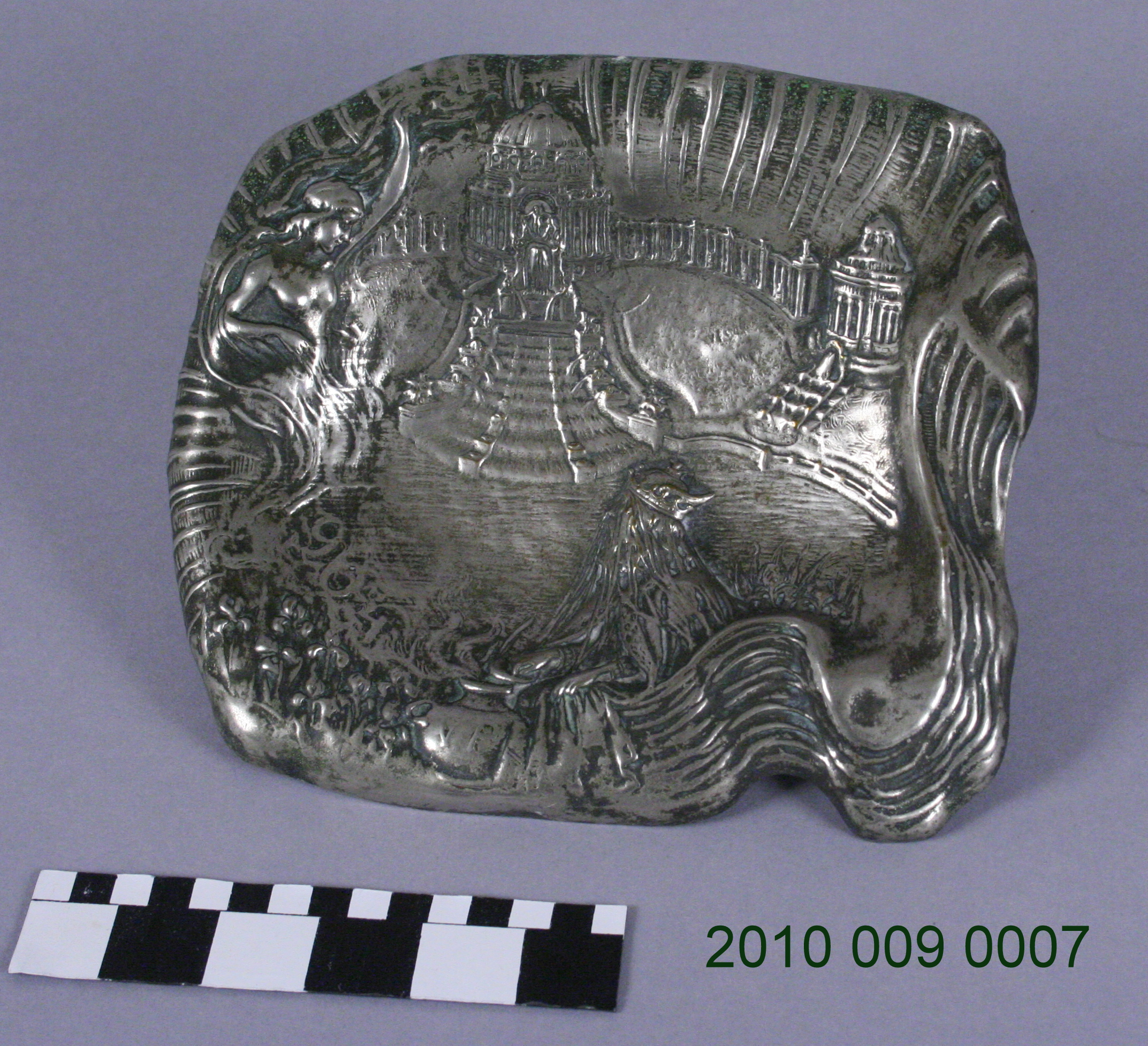
Metal World's Fair (1904) tray with image of Prophet on throne, building, and female personification at left

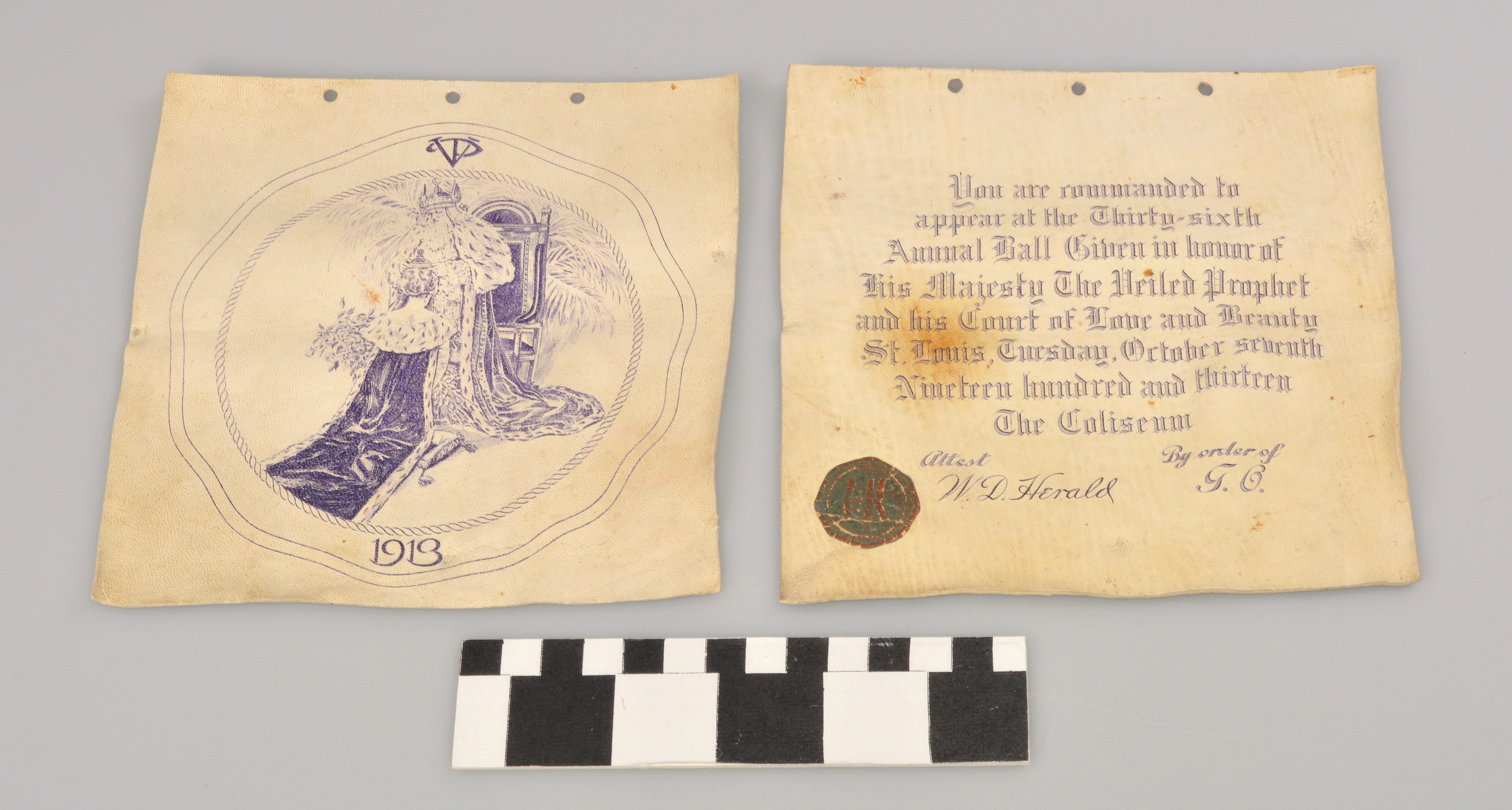
Ball invitation, 1913, with measuring marker at the bottom

== See also ==
- Ku Klux Klan in Southern Illinois, for first use of Missouri Republican woodcut of man posing in Ku Klux Klan garb
- List of Veiled Prophet Parade themes
- Fleur de Lis Ball – St. Louis's other debutante cotillion
- Jewel Ball – another debutante cotillion in Missouri
- Walter B. Stevens (1848–1939), active in the VP organization
