= List of Veiled Prophet Parade and Ball themes =

The following is a list of Veiled Prophet Parade and Ball themes. The events were formerly held each year in St. Louis, Missouri. Where there is no listing, the theme has not been recorded.

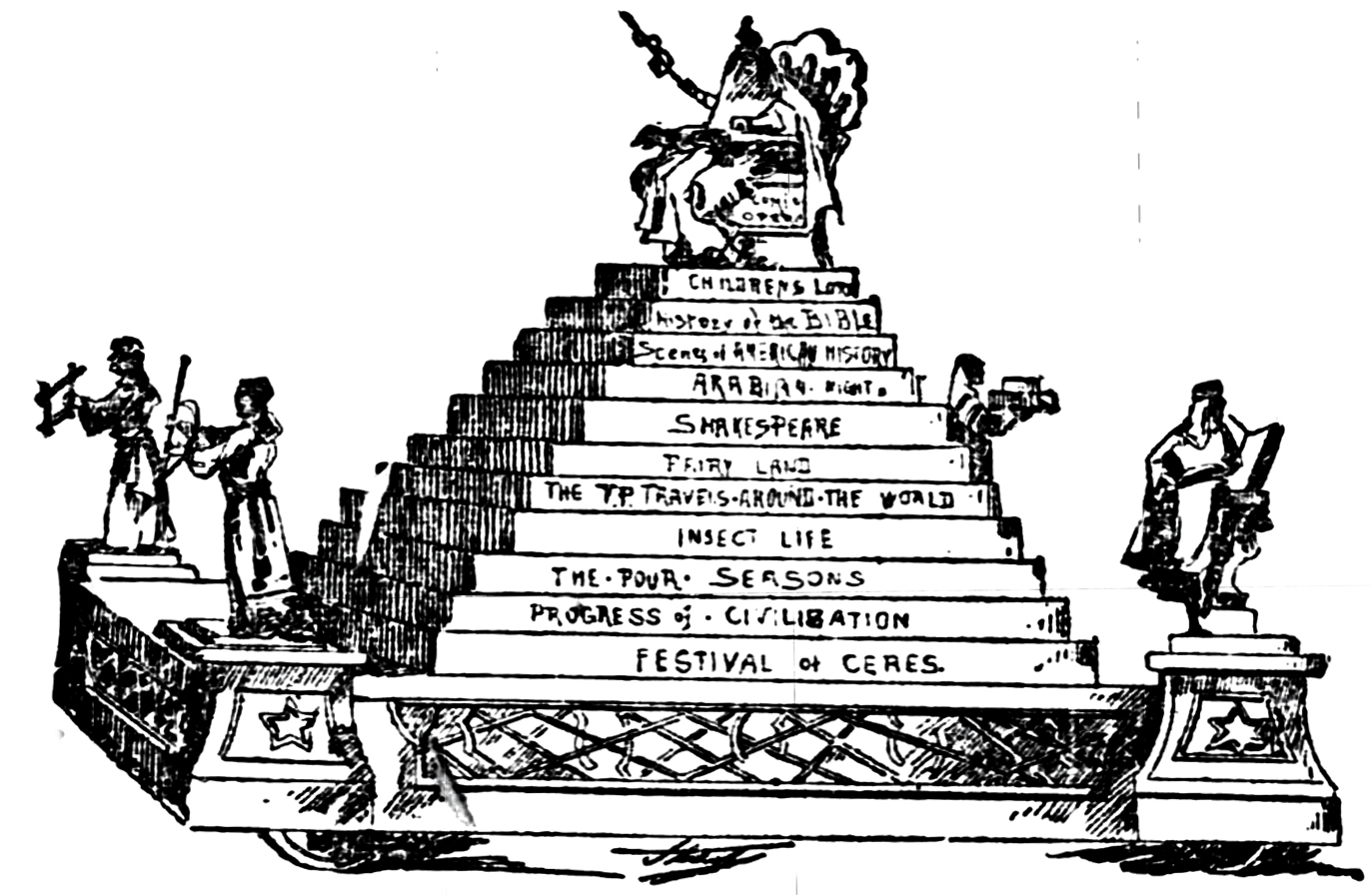
This 1889 float listed all the themes of each Veiled Prophet parade to that date, one theme to each level.

== 19th Century ==
- 1878: Festival of Ceres, an illustrated pageant of the visit of Demeter, Grecian goddess of agriculture, to the Veiled Prophets
- 1879: Progress of the mechanical arts
- 1880: The four seasons
- 1881: A day-dream in the woodland or Insect life
- 1882: A panorama of the nations
- 1883: Fairy Land
- 1884: Shakespeare's poesy
- 1885: An Arabian night
- 1886: American history
- 1887: Old Testament stories
- 1888: Child lore
- 1889: Comic opera
- 1890: The alphabet
- 1891: The ten most popular authors
- 1892: The history of the Upper Louisiana Territory, Missouri and St. Louis
- 1893: Storied holidays
- 1894: History of mystic societies in America
- 1895: The flight of time (the zodiac, days of the week and months of the year
- 1896: Masterpieces of art
- 1897: Old-time songs
- 1899: Visions of childhood
- 1900: Pageant of the nations

== 20th Century ==
=== 1901–1950 ===
- 1901: Louisiana Purchase
- 1902: From the Discovery of the Mississippi to the World's Fair
- 1903: Lyric Opera
- 1904: Art and Architecture
- 1905: Humor
- 1907: History and Drama
- 1908: The Seven Ages and the Five Senses
- 1909: Transportation
- 1910: Sport
- 1911: Epochs in the history of the Eighteenth Century
- 1912: Songs, Poems, and Plays
- 1913: The Seven Ages and the Five Senses
- 1914: While We Live, Let Us Live (the European war)
- 1915: Legends and Myths of All Nations
- 1916: Shakespeare
- 1917: Parade canceled.
- 1918: Parade canceled.
- 1919: Victory-Peace
- 1920: Flowers and Plants
- 1921: Missouri statehood centenary
- 1922: Dollyana (dolls of the nations)
- 1923: Romance and Adventure
- 1924: Jewels and Talismans
- 1925: Decorations of Honor
- 1926: Cartoons and Comics
- 1927: Our Daily Life
- 1929: Traditions of St. Louis
- 1930: The Making of a Great Nation
- 1931: The Romance of Trade and Industry
- 1932: The Life of George Washington
- 1933: A Journey Through Bookland
- 1934: Great Adventurers
- 1934: Toyland
- 1936: The Prophet Visits Many Lands
- 1937: Childhood Memories
- 1938: Songs We Sing
- 1939: Gay Nineties
- 1940: The Arabian Nights
- 1941: The Circus
- 1946: Modes of Travel
- 1947: Days of the Year
- 1948: Mother Goose
- 1949: Once Upon a Time
- 1950: Old Songs

=== 1951–2000 ===
- 1951: Good Neighbors
- 1952: The Story of St. Louis
- 1953: Years of the Veiled Prophet
- 1954: The Veiled Prophet Salutes the Municipal Opera
- 1955: What Shall I Be?
- 1956: Around the Calendar
- 1957: Parade of the Animals
- 1958: Great Discoveries and Inventions
- 1959: Delights of Childhood
- 1960: Folklore and Legends
- 1961: Joys of Toys
- 1962: Great Adventures
- 1963: Songs We Sing
- 1964: St. Louis History
- 1965: Stories and Scenes From the Past
- 1966: Sports
- 1967: A Salute to the Wonderful Worlds of Walt Disney
- 1968: Music for Everyone
- 1969: The New Spirit of St. Louis (and) From the Lone Eagle to the lunar eagle
- 1970: St. Louis Is a Great Place to Live
- 1972: Happiness Is . . .
- 1973: You Are There
- 1974: If Aladdin's Magic Lamp Were Mine
- 1975: These Are a Few of My Favorite Things
- 1976: A Salute to America
- 1977: The Veiled Prophet — 100 Years in St. Louis
- 1978 The Wonderful World of Children
- 1979: That's Entertainment
- 1980: Holidays
- 1981: Nostalgia in General and the St. Louis World's Fair of 1904 in Particular
- 1982: Heritage of St. Louis
- 1983: St. Louis — Great Moments in Fantasy
- 1984: When You Wish Upon a Star
- 1985: A History of Fun
- 1986: America the Beautiful
- 1987: We the People Sing
- 1988: These Are a Few of My Favorite Things, a repetition from 1975
- 1989: School Days
- 1990: Celebrations
- 1991: Through the Eyes of a Child
- 1992: A Child's Library
- 1993: Great Adventures
- 1994: A Festival of Fun and Games
- 1995: Beauty of Nature
- 1996: Once Upon a Time
- 1997: I Want to Be a . . .
- 1998: Let the Good Times Roll
- 1999: Parade Through Time
- 2000: Getting There Is Half the Fun

== 21st Century ==
- 2001: 2001: A Sports Odyssey
- 2002: 125 Years of Paradise
- 2003: The World Is Our Playground
- 2005: A Salute to Volunteers
- 2011: A Night Out
- 2016: Hats Off to Heroes
- 2017: Great Things Are Happening
- 2019: We the People

== See also ==
- List of Rose Parade themes
- Invitations to the Veiled Prophet Ball
- List of Veiled Prophet Belles and Queens
