= List of Veiled Prophet Belles and Queens =

This is a list of women who have been particularly honored at the Veiled Prophet Ball in St. Louis, Missouri, as either belle or queen.

Some Veiled Prophet Queens, St. Louis Republic, September 23, 1900. They are, clockwise, from top left, Hester Laughlin, 1894; Jane Dorothy Fordyce, 1897; Marie Theresa Scanlan, 1898; Ellen Humphries Walsh, 1899; Mary Louise McCreery, 1896; and Bessie Kingsland, 1895. The woman in the center was not identified.

== Origin ==
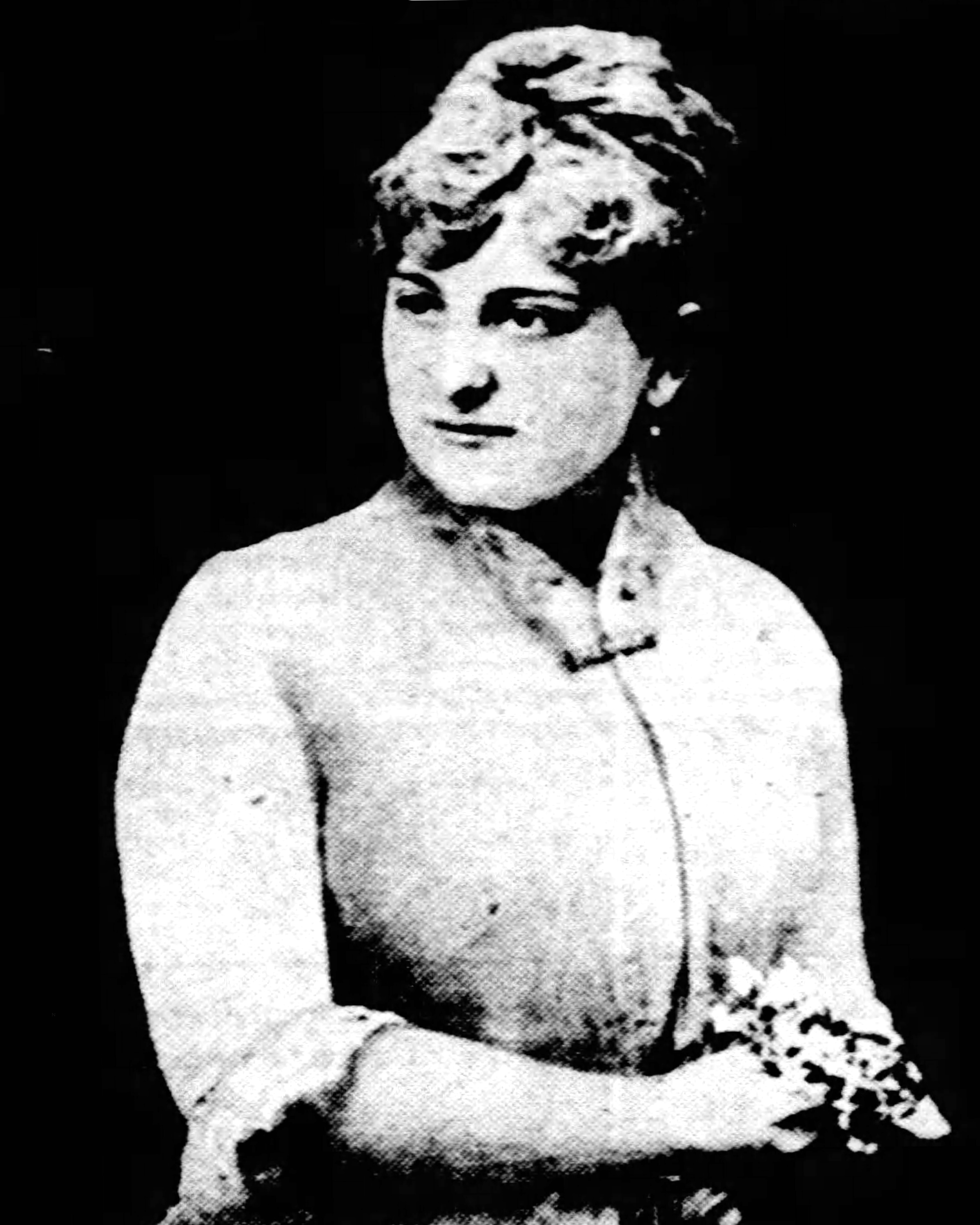
Suzanne Slayback, 1878

The custom of singling out a young woman for special attention began with the first Veiled Prophet Ball in 1878, when Suzanne (Susie) Slayback was chosen by the first Veiled Prophet, John G. Priest, to be the "belle" of the ball at the age of 16. According to a 1958 article in the St. Louis Globe-Democrat, in those earlier times it was "the custom of the Prophet to select a girl for his partner in the first dance at the ball."

The first crowned "queen" was Hester Bates Laughlin in 1894, whose coiffure was topped with a headpiece supposedly a replica of that worn by Queen Victoria.

Hester Bates Laughlin, 1894

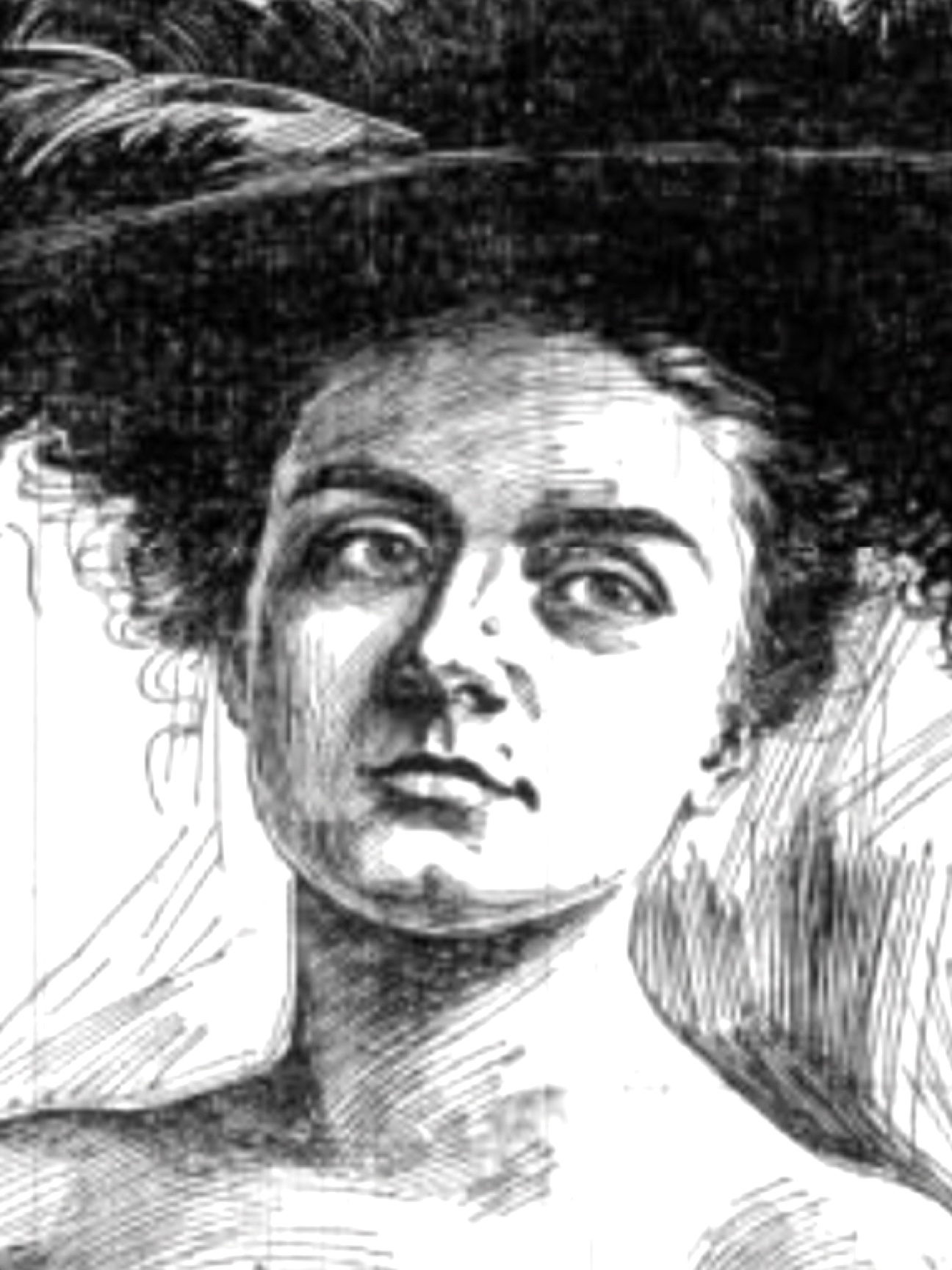
Marie Scanlan, 1898

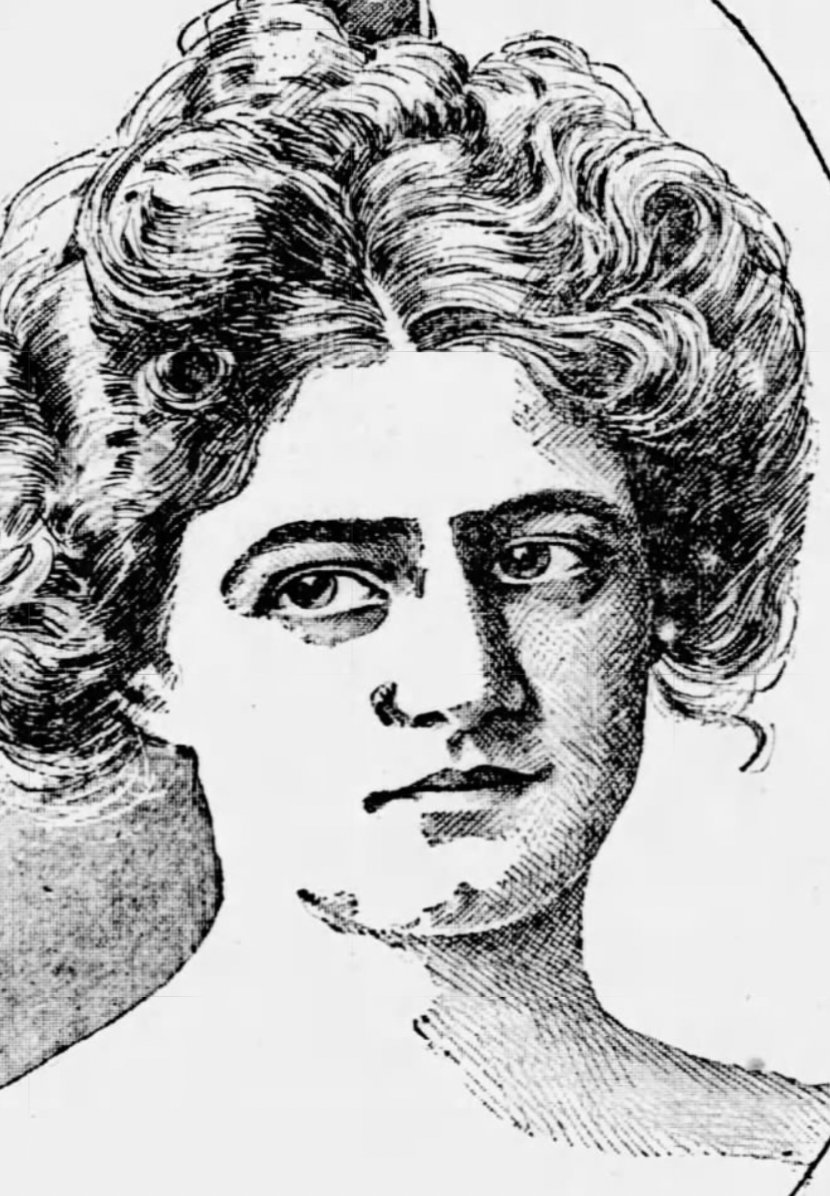
Ellen H. Walsh, 1899

Louise Chouteau, 1903

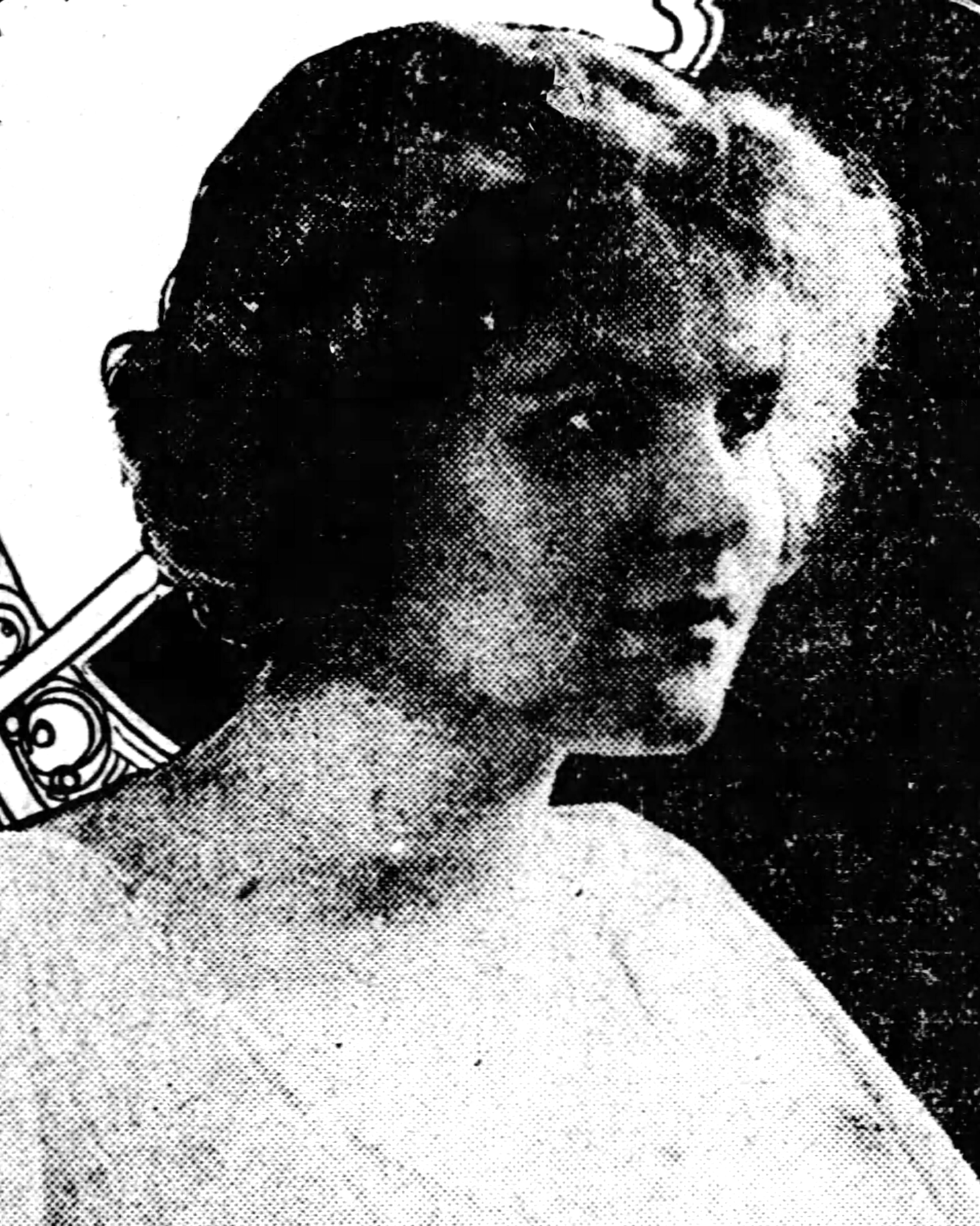
Jane Taylor, 1912

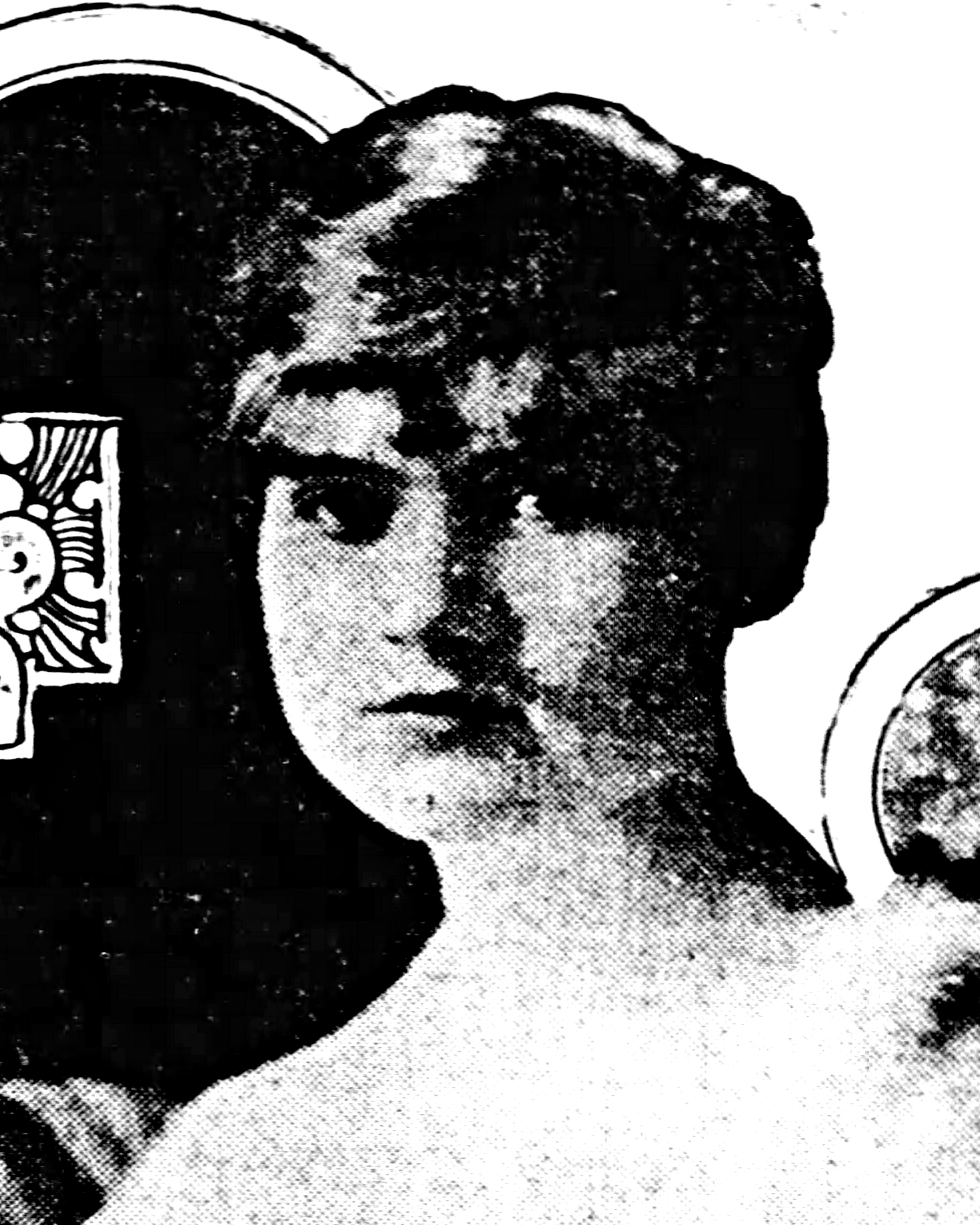
Adaline Capen, 1913

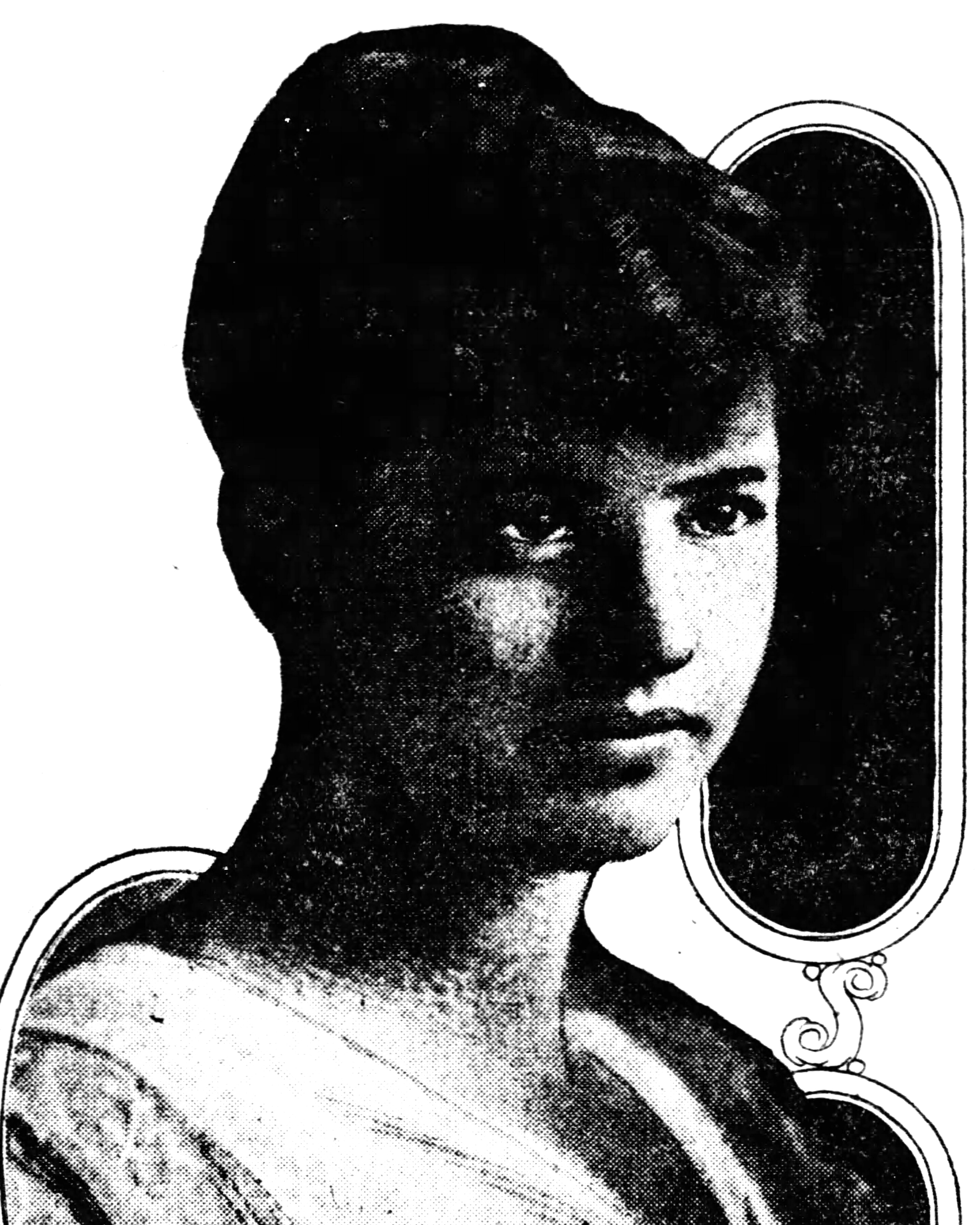
Ella Zeibig, 1914

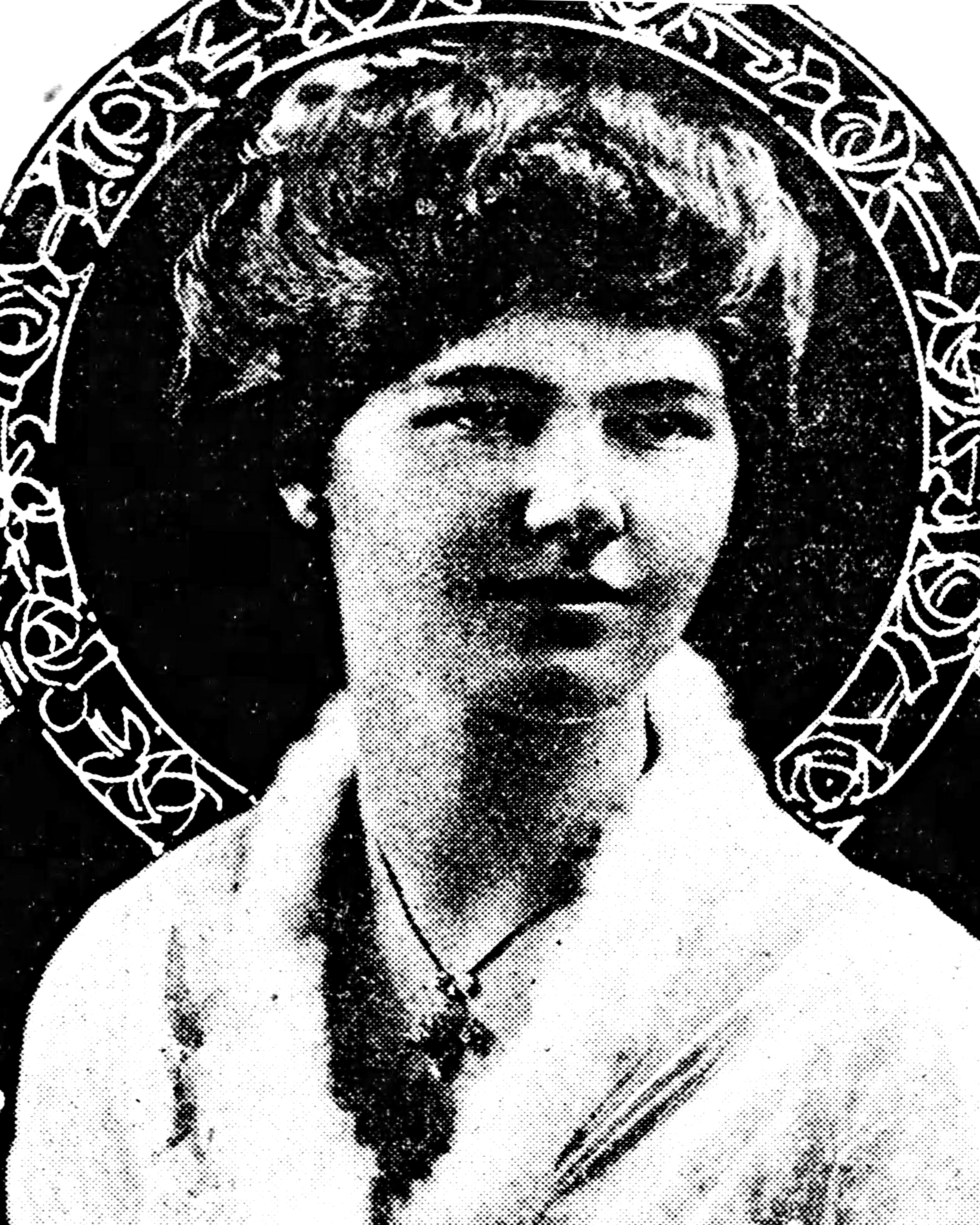
Jane Shapleigh, 1915

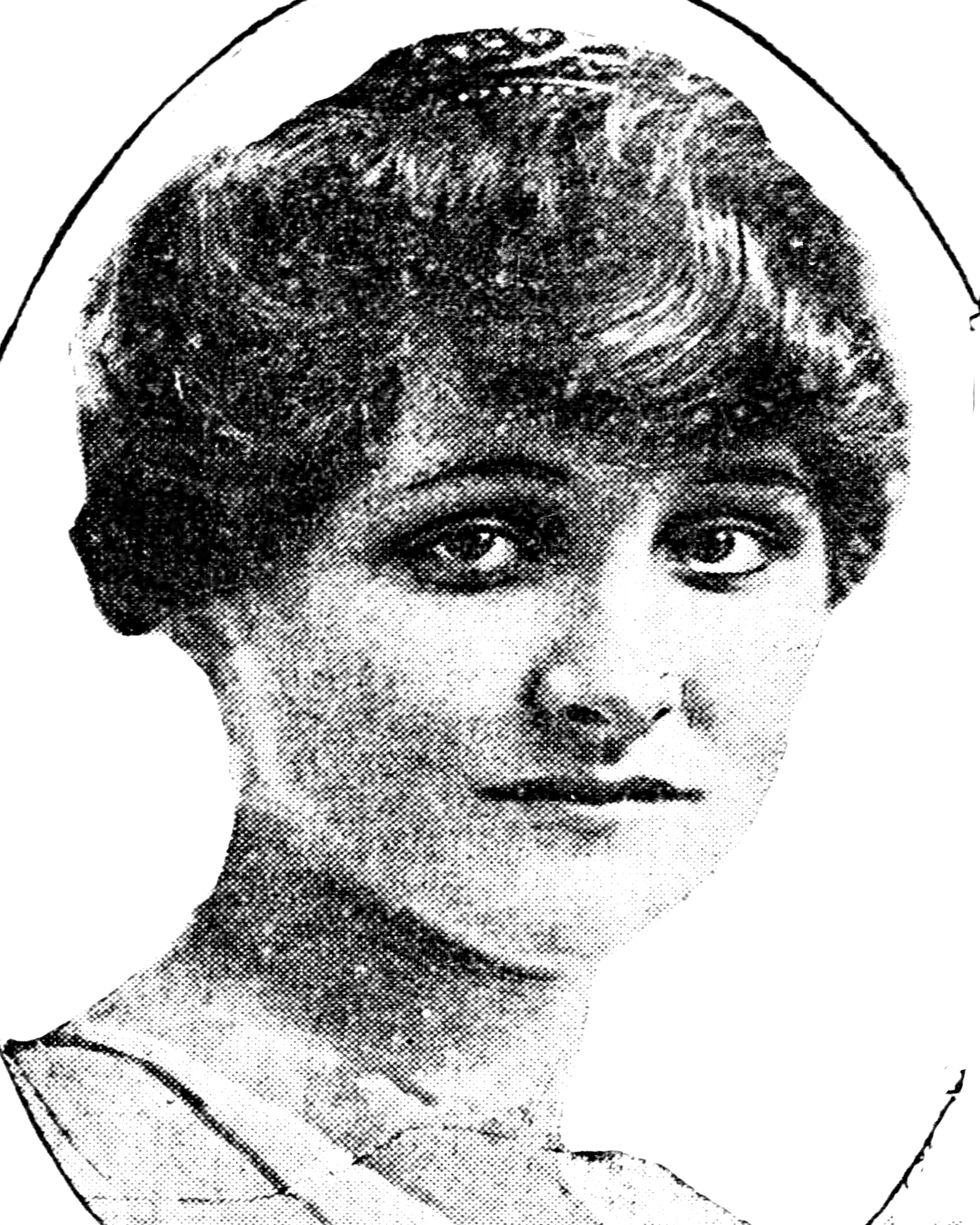
Mary D. Jones, 1916

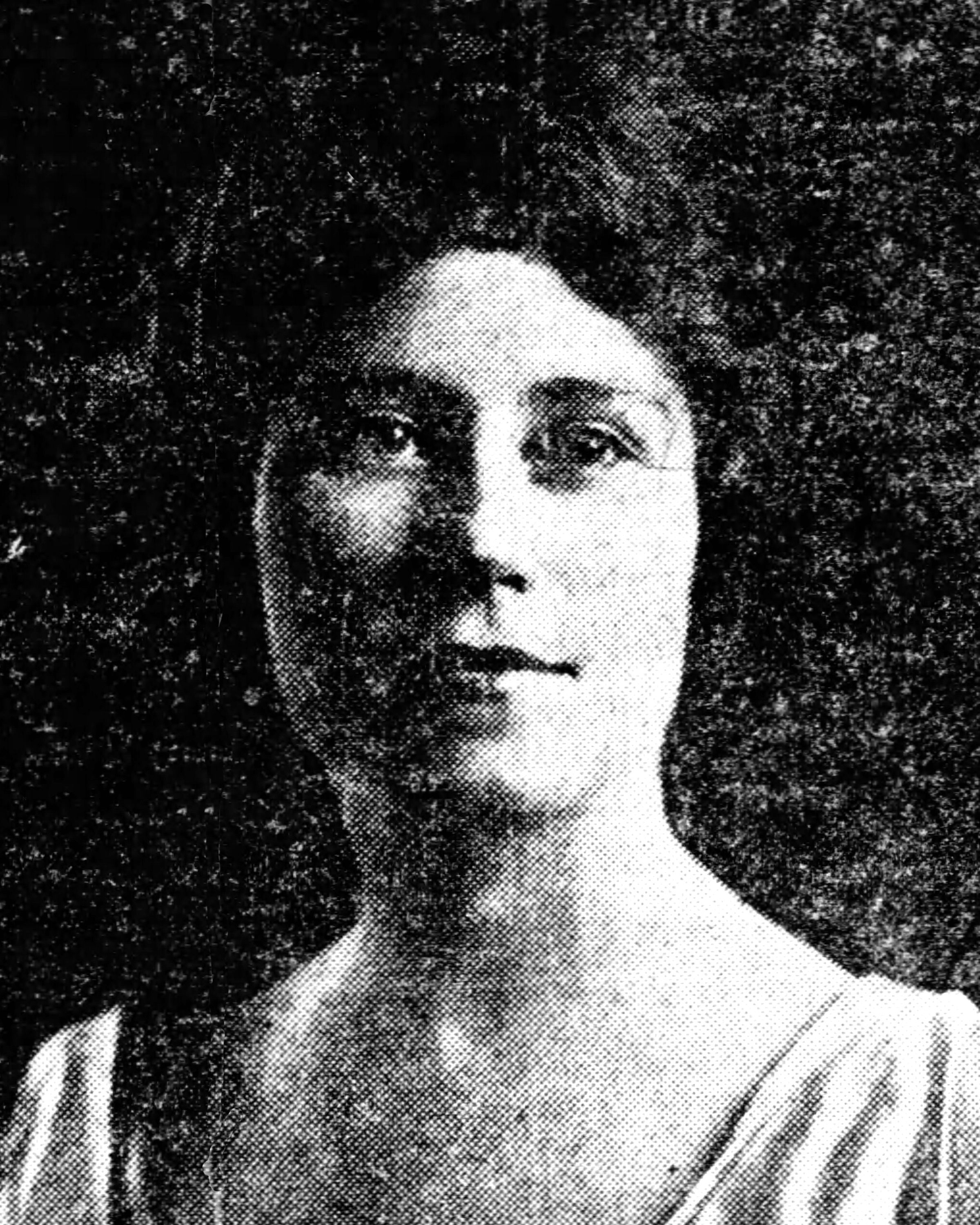
Marian Franciscus, 1919

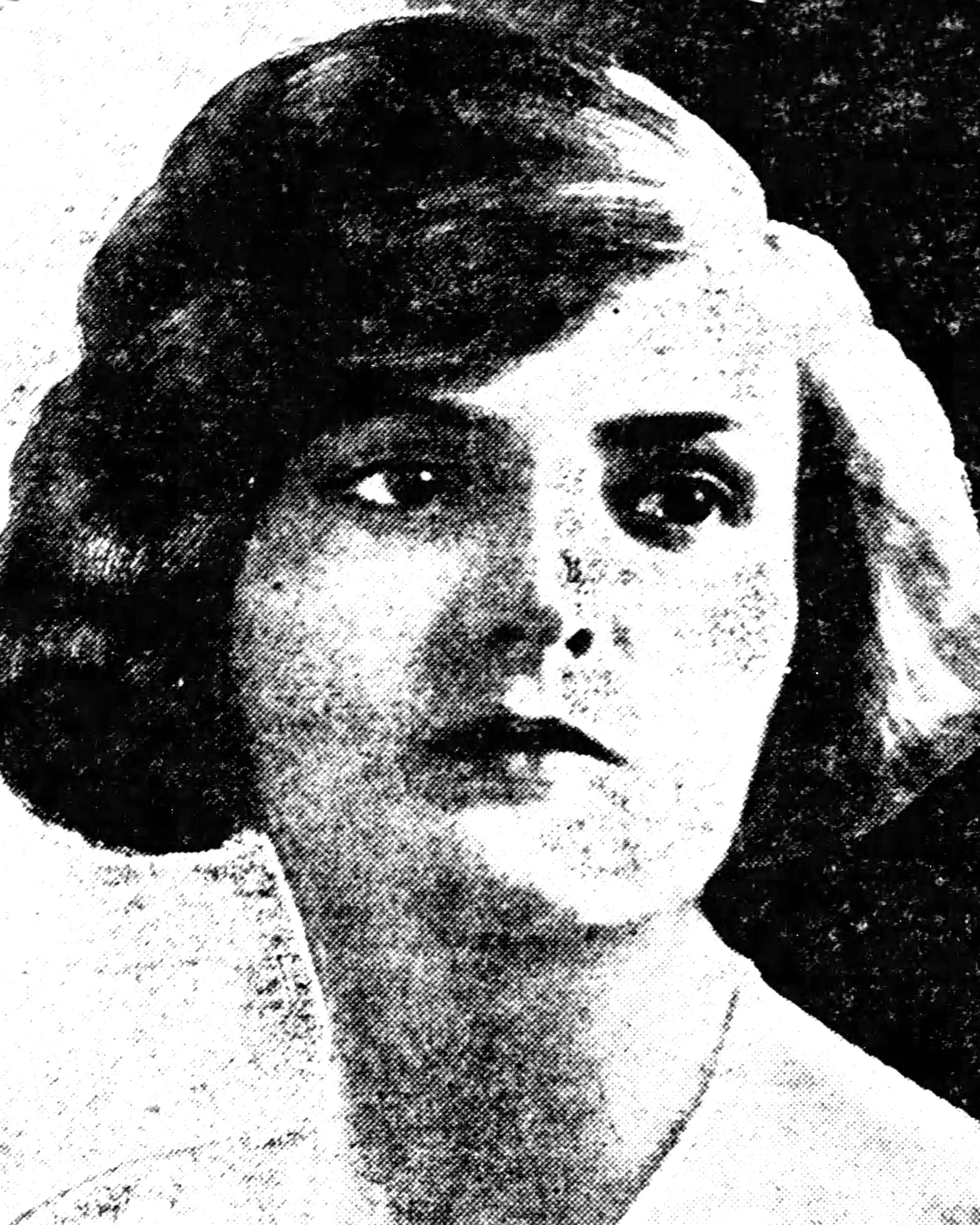
Ada R. Johnson, 1920

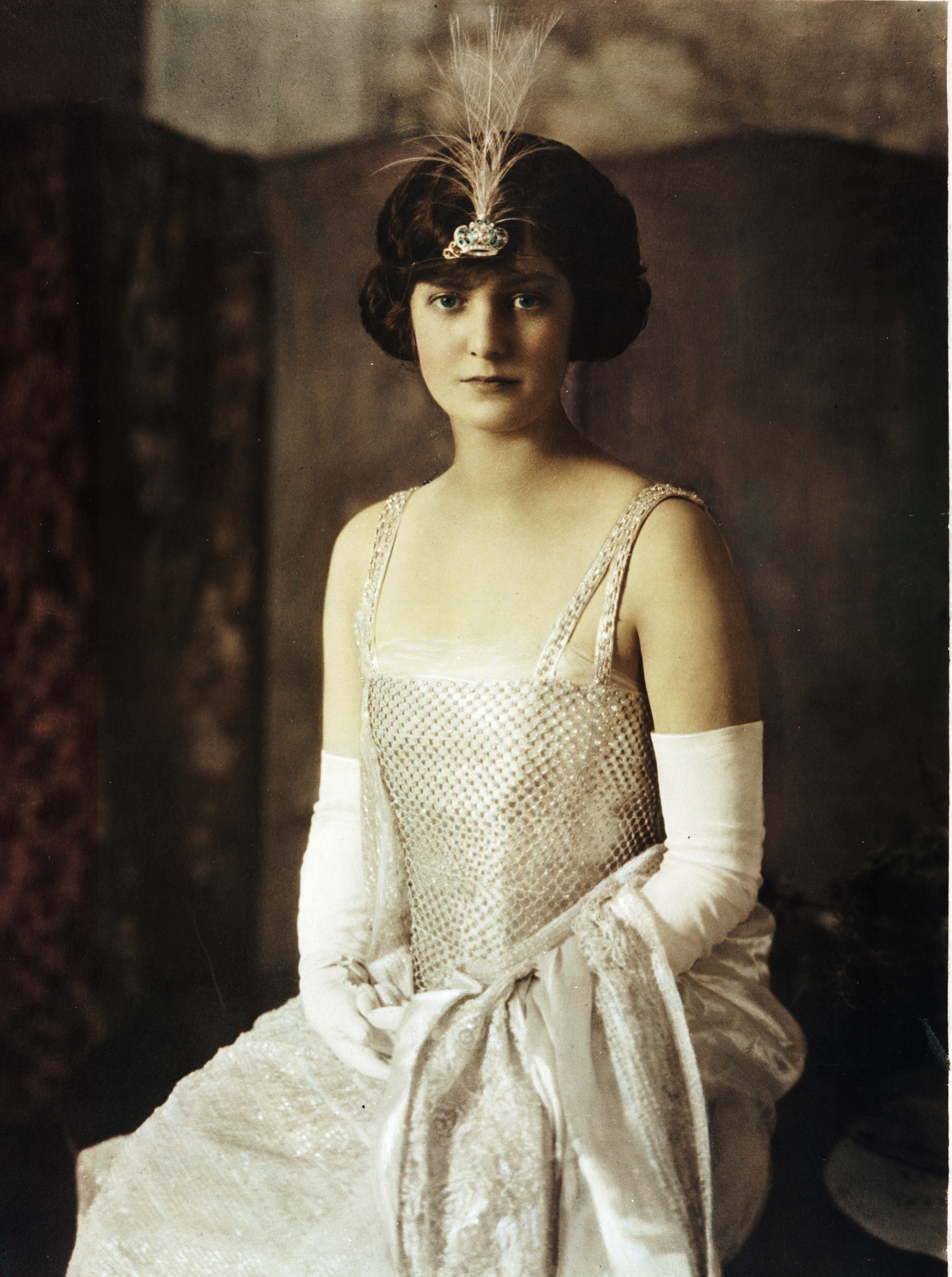
Eleanor Simmons, 1921

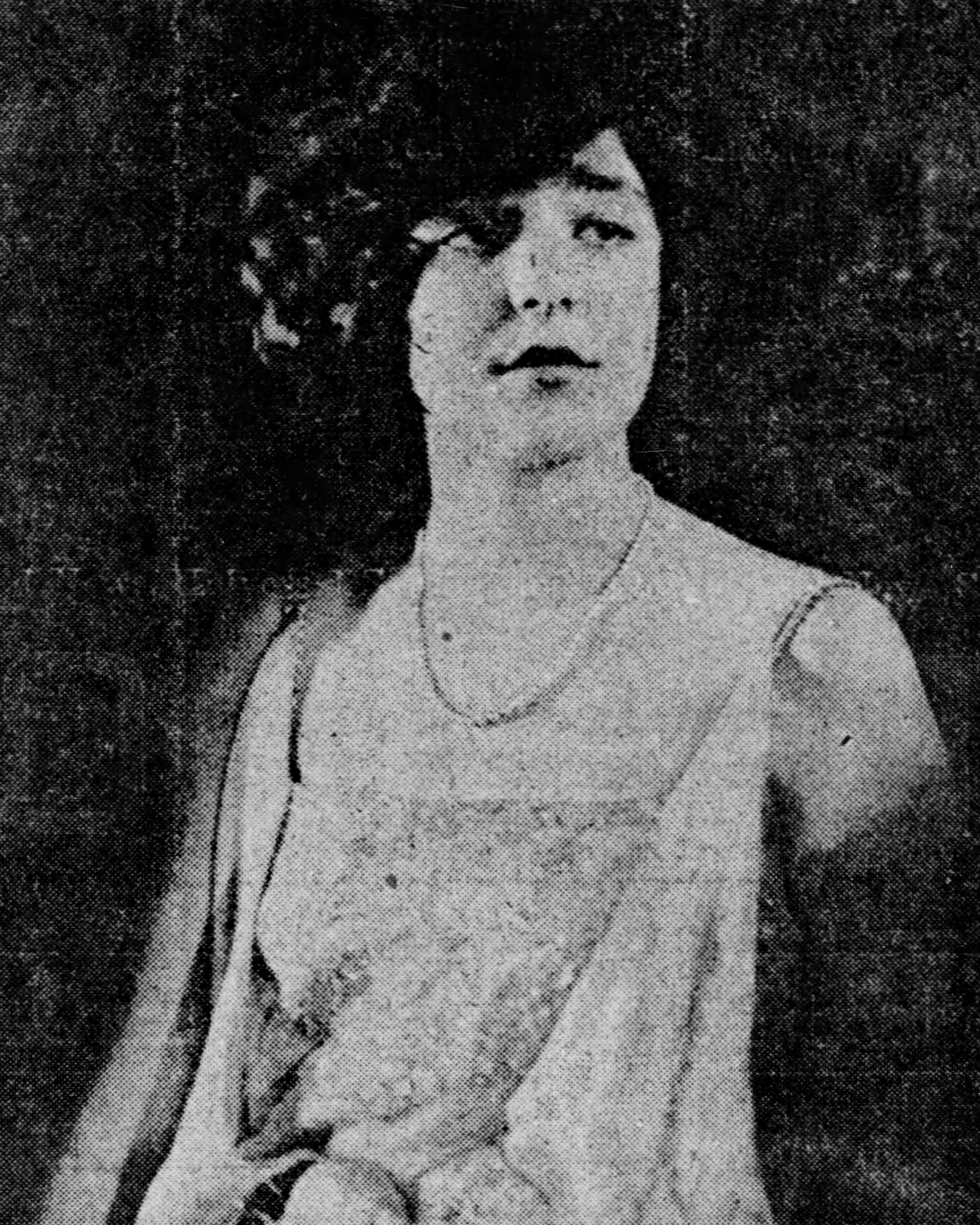
Alice Busch, 1922

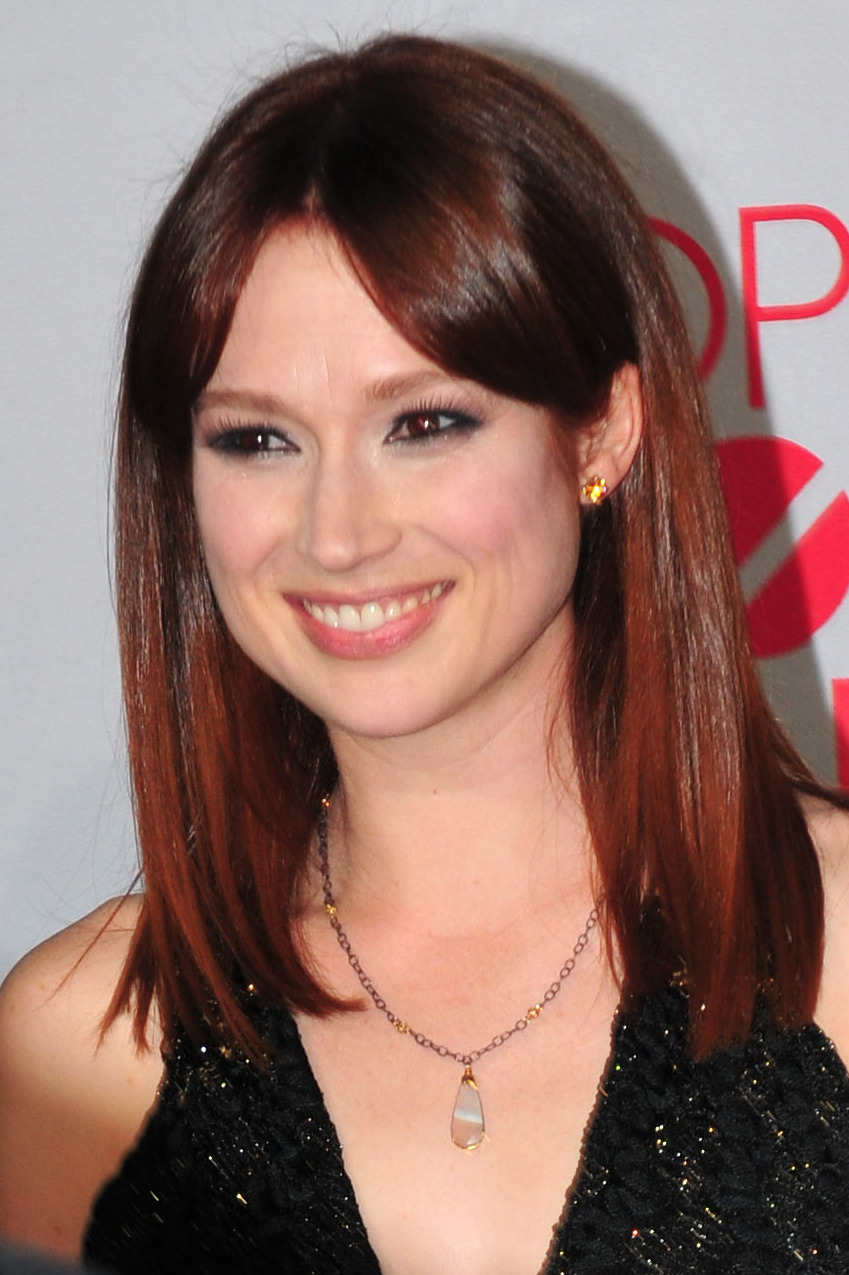
Ellie Kemper, 1999

The Veiled Prophet honorees have been:

== Belles ==
=== 1878–1893 ===
- 1878 Susie Slayback
- 1885 Virginia Joy
- 1886 Louise (Lulu) Scott
- 1887 No honoree due to visit of President and Mrs. Grover Cleveland
- 1888 Louise Galennie
- 1889 Miss Wain (from Cleveland)
- 1890 Katherine (Kate) Hill
- 1891 July Thompson
- 1892 Ellen Sturges
- 1893 Florence Lucas

== Queens ==
=== 1894–1900 ===
- 1894 Hester Bates Laughlin
- 1895 Bessie Kingsland
- 1896 Mary Louise McCreery
- 1897 Jane Dorothy Fordyce
- 1898 Marie Theresa Scanlan
- 1899 Ellen H. Walsh
- 1900 Susan Larkin Thomson

=== 1901–1950 ===
- 1901 Emily Catlin Wickham
- 1902 Maud Wells
- 1903 Lucille Chouteau
- 1904 Stella Wade
- 1905 Julia Cabanne
- 1906 Marguerite Kehlor Tower
- 1907 Margaret Cabell
- 1908 Dorothy Shapleigh
- 1909 Susan Rebecca Carleton
- 1910 Lucy Norvell
- 1911 Ada Randolph
- 1912 Jane Taylor
- 1913 Adaline Capen
- 1914 Elsa Zeibig
- 1915 Jane Shapleigh
- 1916 Mary D. Jones
- 1917–1918 (No ball because of World War I)
- 1919 Marian Franciscus
- 1920 Ada Johnson
- 1921 Eleanor Simmons
- 1922 Alice Busch
- 1923 Grace Wallace
- 1924 Mary Virginia Collins
- 1925 Maud Miller Streett
- 1926 Martha Irene Love
- 1927 Anne Semple
- 1928 Mary Ambrose Smith (disqualified due to secret marriage)
- 1929 Jean Ford
- 1930 Jane Francis
- 1931 Ann Ferriss
- 1932 Myrtle Lambert
- 1933 Jane Johnson
- 1934 Jane Wells
- 1935 Lila Childress
- 1936 Susan Thompson
- 1937 Nancy Morrill
- 1938 Laura Rand
- 1939 Jane Smith
- 1940 Rosalie McRee
- 1941 Barbara Wear
- 1942–1945 (No ball because of World War II)
- 1946 Anne Kennett Desloge
- 1947 Dorothy Danforth
- 1948 Sally Rubicam
- 1949 Carol Gardner
- 1950 Eleanor Koehler

=== 1951–2000 ===
- 1951 Mary Kennard Wallace
- 1952 Sally Shepley
- 1953 Julia Terry
- 1954 Barbara Whittemore
- 1955 Audrey Wallace
- 1956 Helene Bakewell
- 1957 Carol Culver
- 1958 Carolyn Niedringhaus
- 1959 Laura Rand Orthwein
- 1960 Sally Ford Curby
- 1961 Anne Marie Baldwin
- 1962 Diane Waring Desloge
- 1963 Anne Kennard Newhard
- 1964 Alice Busch Condie
- 1965 Becky Wells Jones
- 1966 Jane Howard Shapleigh
- 1967 Rosalie McRee Ewing
- 1968 Rebecca Dixon Williams
- 1969 Josephine Carr Brodhead
- 1970 Phoebe Mercer Scott
- 1971 Lenita Collins Morrill
- 1972 Hope Florence Jones
- 1973 Susan Mitchell Conant
- 1974 Susan Clark Smith
- 1975 Sarah Hitchcock Moore
- 1976 Cynthia Gray Danforth
- 1977 Gertrude Marie Busch
- 1978 Elizabeth Courtney Johnson
- 1979 Susan Pierson Smith
- 1980 Eleanor Church Hawes
- 1981 Talbot Peters MacCarthy
- 1982 Alice Margaret Maritz
- 1983 Elizabeth Ford Johnston
- 1984 Mary Genevieve Hyland
- 1985 Jennifer Lee Knight
- 1986 Stephanie Marie Schnuck
- 1987 Emily Shepley Barksdale
- 1988 Elizabeth Gray Elliott
- 1989 Alice Marie Behan
- 1990 Carter Gedge Walker
- 1991 Katherine Hall McDonnell
- 1992 Kelly Crawford Taylor
- 1993 McKay Noland Baur
- 1994 Margaret "Molly" Dunne Hager
- 1995 Martha Elizabeth "Marka" Matthews
- 1996 Elizabeth Ann Bryan
- 1997 Rosalie "Lele" Ewing Engler
- 1998 Josephine Marie Condie
- 1999 Elizabeth Claire Kemper
- 2000 Carolyn Elizabeth Schnuck

=== 2001 and after ===
- 2001 Julia Ryerson Schlafly
- 2002 Lucy Hager Schnuck
- 2003 Lauren Morgan Dorsey Thomas
- 2004 Elizabeth Garrett Benoist
- 2005 Julie Anne Stupp
- 2006 Janice Hope Jones
- 2007 Katherine Remington Martin
- 2008 Elizabeth Bunn Hailand
- 2009 Melissa Benton Howe
- 2010 Laura Hogan Hollo
- 2011 Eleanor Clark Brennan
- 2012 Margaret Frances Schnuck
- 2013 Katherine Falk Desloge
- 2014 Merrill Clark Hermann
- 2015 Charlotte Capen Jones
- 2016 Eliza Dooley Johnson
- 2017 Corinne Marie Condie
- 2018 Cecelia Ann Fox
- 2019 Lily Shelton Baur
- 2020 postponed to 2021 due to the COVID-19 pandemic in Missouri
- 2021
- 2022 Lily Shelton Baur
- 2023
- 2024

== See also ==
- List of Veiled Prophet Parade themes
