= Timeline of the 18th century =

This is a timeline of the 18th century.

== 1700s ==
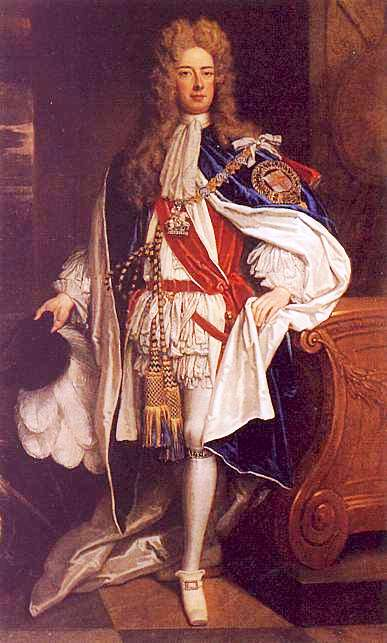
John Churchill, 1st Duke of Marlborough.

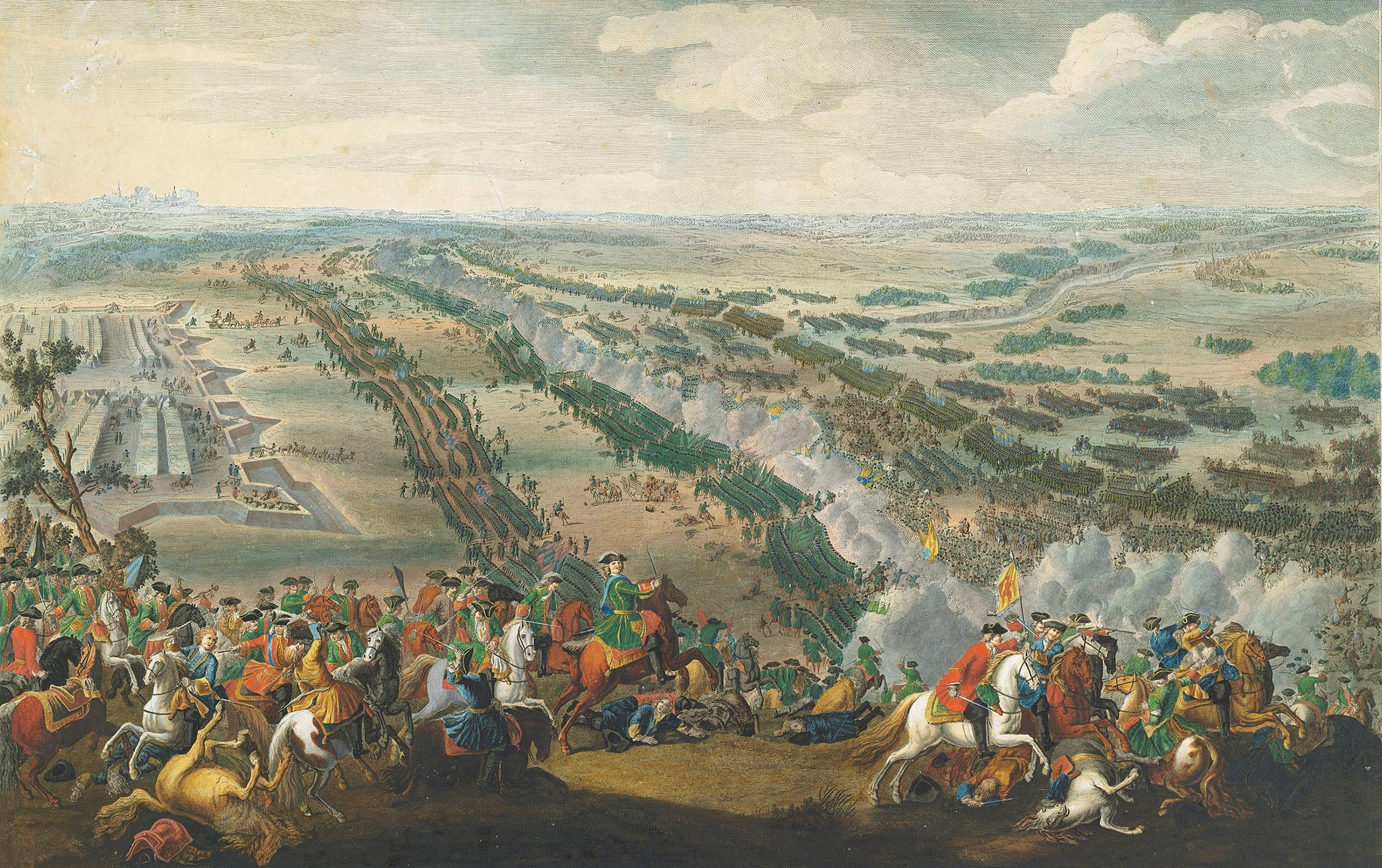
The Battle of Poltava in 1709 turned the Russian Empire into a European power.

- 1700–1721: Great Northern War between the Russian and Swedish Empires.
- 1701: Kingdom of Prussia declared under King Frederick I.
- 1701: Ashanti Empire is formed under Osei Kofi Tutu I.
- 1701–1714: War of the Spanish Succession is fought, involving most of continental Europe.
- 1701–1702: The Daily Courant and The Norwich Post become the first daily newspapers in England.
- 1702: Forty-seven rōnin attack Kira Yoshinaka and then commit seppuku in Japan.
- 1702–1715: Camisard Rebellion in France.
- 1703: Saint Petersburg is founded by Peter the Great; it is the Russian capital until 1918.
- 1703–1711: The Rákóczi Uprising against the Habsburg monarchy.
- 1704: End of Japan's Genroku period.
- 1704: First Javanese War of Succession.
- 1705: George Frideric Handel's first opera, Almira, premieres.
- 1706: War of the Spanish Succession: French troops defeated at the battles of Ramillies and Turin.
- 1706: The first English-language edition of the Arabian Nights is published.
- 1707: The Act of Union is passed, merging the Scottish and English Parliaments, thus establishing the Kingdom of Great Britain.
- 1707: After Aurangzeb's death, the Mughal Empire enters a long decline and the Maratha Empire slowly replaces it.
- 1707: Mount Fuji erupts in Japan for the first time in 10,000 years.
- 1707: War of 27 Years between the Marathas and Mughals ends in India.
- 1708: The Company of Merchants of London Trading into the East Indies and English Company Trading to the East Indies merge to form the United Company of Merchants of England Trading to the East Indies.
- 1708–1709: Famine kills one-third of East Prussia's population.
- 1709: The Great Frost of 1709 marks the coldest winter in 500 years.
- 1709: Hotak dynasty founded in Afghanistan.
- 1709: Charles XII of Sweden flees to the Ottoman Empire after Peter I of Russia defeats his army at the Battle of Poltava.

Tokugawa Yoshimune, Shōgun of Japan.

== 1710s ==
- 1710: The world's first copyright legislation, Britain's Statute of Anne, takes effect.
- 1710–1711: Ottoman Empire fights Russia in the Russo-Turkish War.
- 1711–1715: Tuscarora War between British, Dutch, and German settlers and the Tuscarora people of North Carolina.
- 1712: War of the Spanish Succession: The French defeat a combined Dutch-Austrian force at the Battle of Denain.
- 1712: The first shipment of coffee from Java reaches Amsterdam.
- 1713: The Treaty of Utrecht until War of the Spanish Succession ended after treaties of Rastatt and Baden were established in 1913 after a new British Government led to a withdrawal of troops by their subsidiaries.
- 1713–1714: Tarabai establishes the rival Maratha Empire government in Kolhapur against Chattrapati Shahu.
- 1714: Accession of George I, Elector of Hanover, to the throne of Great Britain.
- 1715: The first Jacobite rising breaks out; the British halt the Jacobite advance at the Battle of Sheriffmuir; Battle of Preston.
- 1715: Louis XIV dies, leaving France greatly enlarged but deep in debt; The Regency takes power under Philippe d'Orleans.
- 1715: Pope Clement XI declares Catholicism and Confucianism incompatible.
- 1716: Establishment of the Sikh Confederacy along the present-day India-Pakistan border.
- 1717: The Netherlands, Britain and France sign the Triple Alliance.
- 1717: Surabaya rebels against the VOC.
- 1718: The city of New Orleans is founded by the French in North America.
- 1718: Blackbeard (Edward Teach) is killed by Robert Maynard in a North Carolina inlet on the inner side of Ocracoke Island.
- 1718–1730: Tulip period of the Ottoman Empire.
- 1719: The Spanish attempt to restart the Jacobite rebellion fails.
- 1719: Second Javanese War of Succession.

== 1720s ==
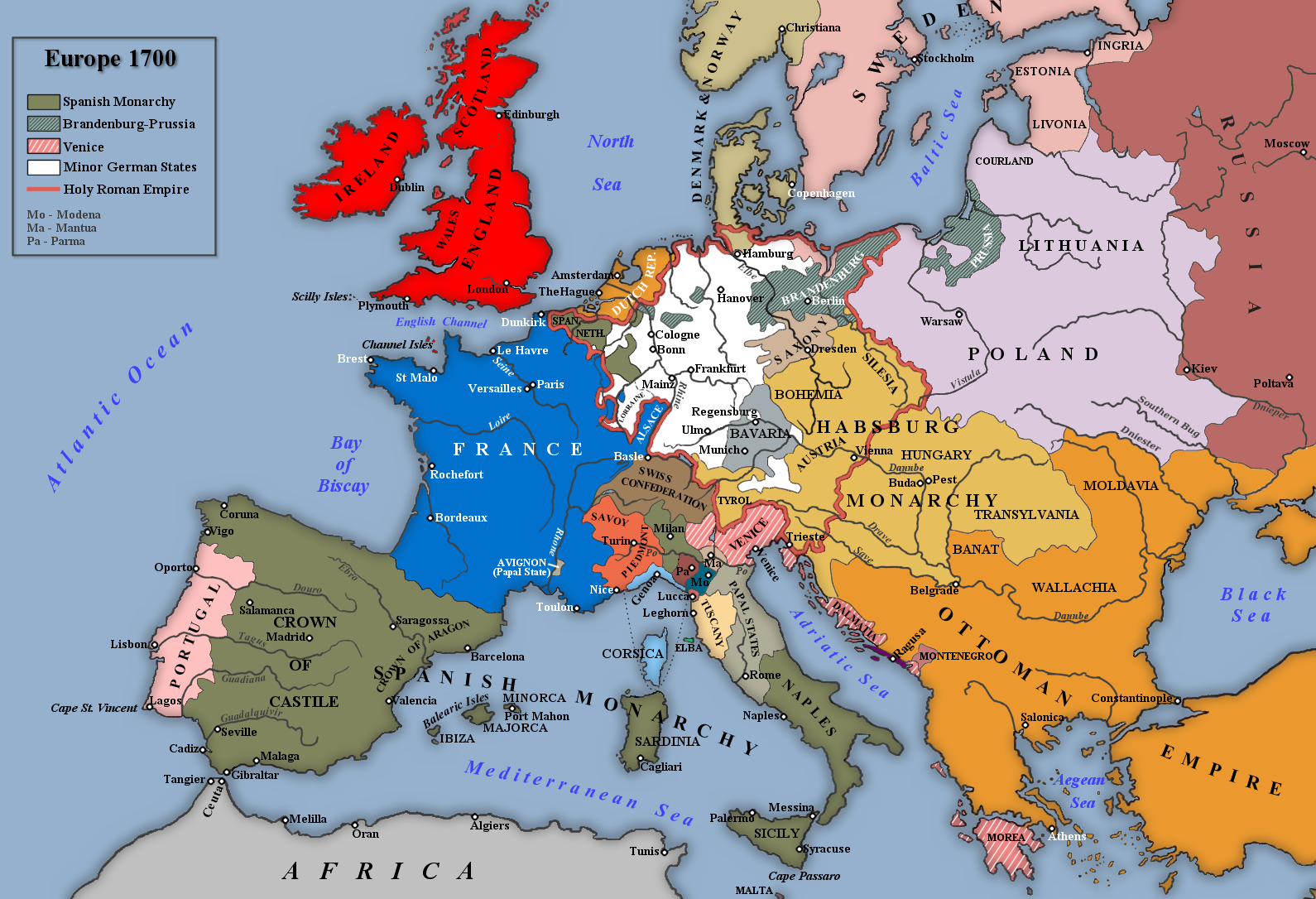
Europe at the beginning of the War of the Spanish Succession, 1700.

- 1720: The South Sea Bubble.
- 1720: Spanish military embarks on the Villasur expedition, traveling north from Mexico into the Great Plains.
- 1720–1721: The Great Plague of Marseille.
- 1721: Robert Walpole becomes the first Prime Minister of Great Britain (de facto).
- 1721: The Treaty of Nystad is signed, ending the Great Northern War.
- 1721: Kangxi Emperor bans Christian missionaries because of Pope Clement XI's decree.
- 1721: Peter I reforms the Russian Orthodox Church.
- 1722: Afghans conquer much of Iran, overthrowing the Safavid Shah Sultan Husayn.
- 1722: Kangxi Emperor of China dies.
- 1722: Bartholomew Roberts is killed in a sea battle off the African coast.
- 1722–1723: Russo-Persian War.
- 1722–1725: Controversy over William Wood's halfpence leads to the Drapier's Letters and begins the Irish economic independence from England movement.
- 1723: Slavery is abolished in Russia; Peter the Great converts household slaves into house serfs.
- 1723–1730: The "Great Disaster", an invasion of Kazakh territories by the Dzungars.
- 1724: The Treaty of Constantinople is signed, partitioning Persia between the Ottoman Empire and Russia.
- 1725: The Fulani nomads take complete control of Futa Jallon and set up the first of many Fulani jihad states to come.
- 1726: The enormous Chinese encyclopedia Complete Classics Collection of Ancient China of over 100 million written Chinese characters in over 800,000 pages is printed in 60 different copies using copper-based Chinese movable type printing.
- 1729: Afghans ousted from Iran by Nader Shah; Safavids restored to the throne.
- 1727–1729: Anglo-Spanish War.
- 1729–1735: Charles Wesley and John Wesley begin Methodism in England.

== 1730s ==
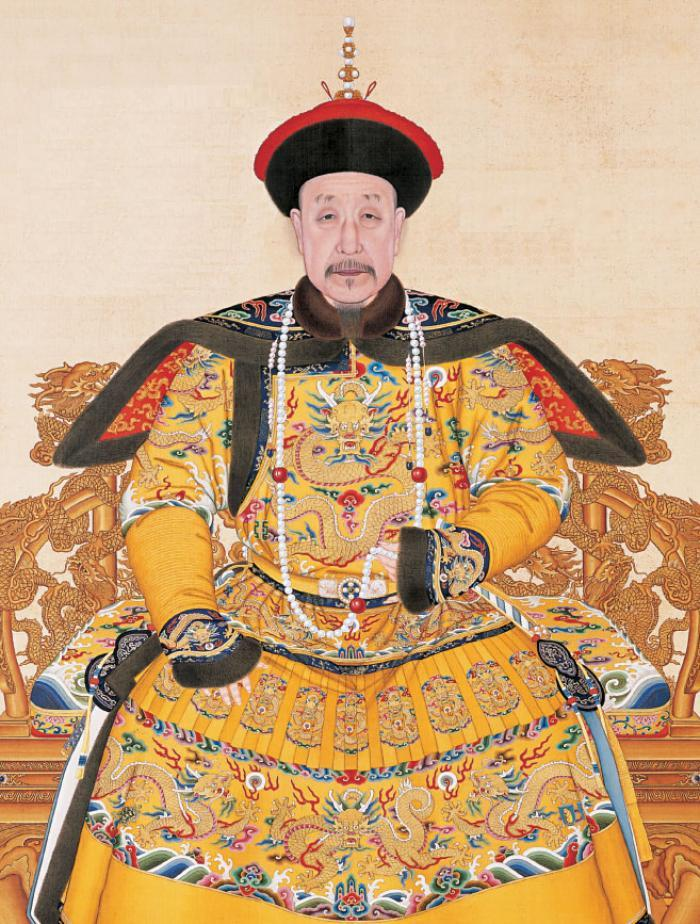
Qianlong Emperor.

- 1730: Mahmud I takes over Ottoman Empire after the Patrona Halil revolt, ending the Tulip period.
- 1730–1760: The First Great Awakening takes place in Great Britain and North America.
- 1732–1734: Crimean Tatar raids into Russia.
- 1733–1738: War of the Polish Succession.
- 1734: Letters Concerning the English Nation by Voltaire published in French.
- 1735–1739: Russo-Turkish War.
- 1735–1799: The Qianlong Emperor of China oversees a huge expansion in territory.
- 1735: Governor-General Dirck van Cloon dies, one of many victims of malaria in Batavia.
- 1736: Nader Shah assumes the title of Shah of Persia and founds the Afsharid dynasty; he rules until his death in 1747.
- 1736: Qing dynasty Chinese court painters recreate Zhang Zeduan's classic panoramic painting, Along the River During Qingming Festival.
- 1738–1756: Famine across the Sahel; half the population of Timbuktu dies.
- 1738: Pope Clement XII issues In eminenti apostolatus, prohibiting Catholics from becoming Freemasons.
- 1738: Turlough O'Carolan, famous Irish harper, dies.
- 1739: Nader Shah defeats the Mughals at the Battle of Karnal and sacks Delhi.
- 1739: Great Britain and Spain fight the War of Jenkins' Ear in the Caribbean.

== 1740s ==
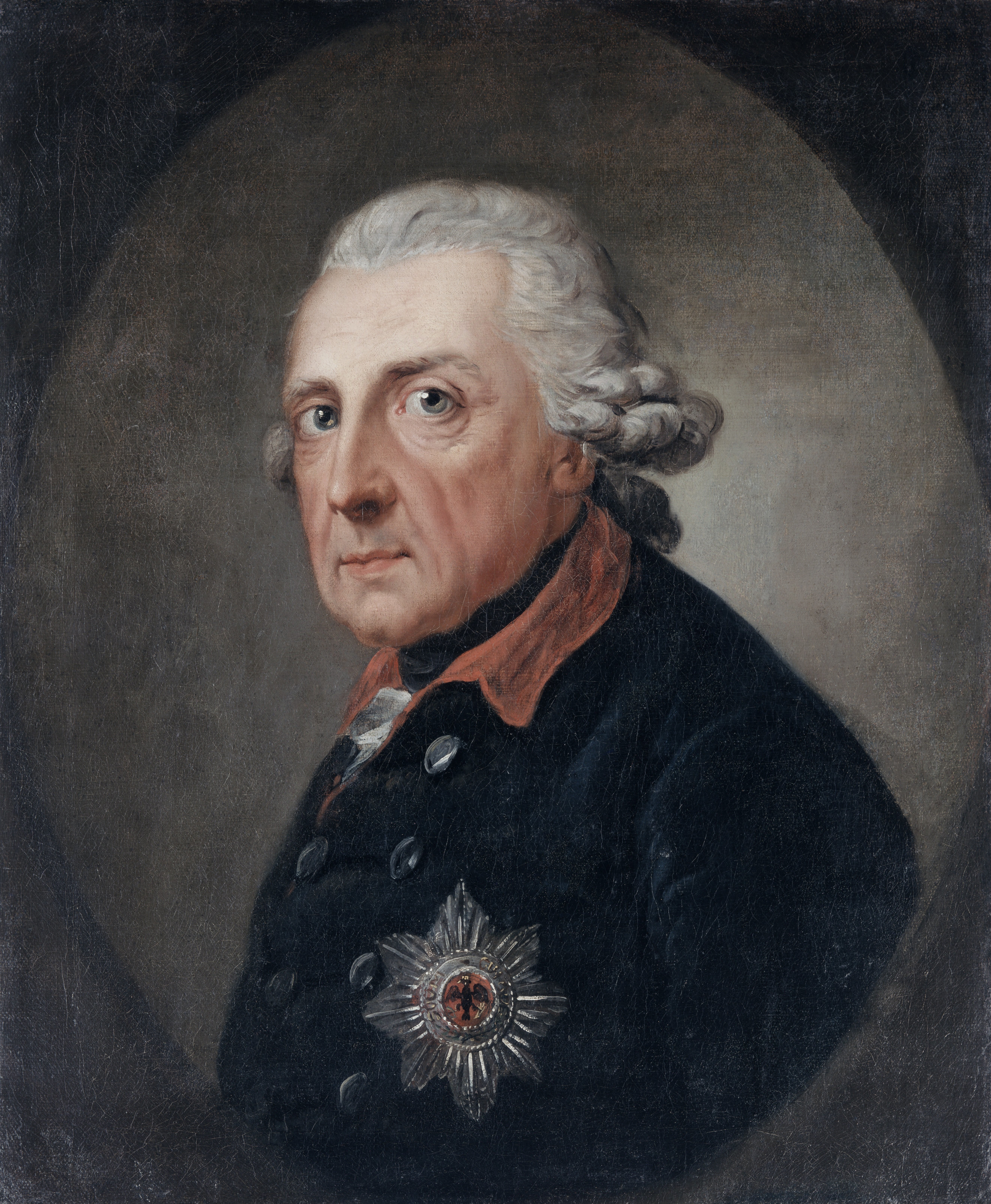
Frederick II the Great, King of Prussia.

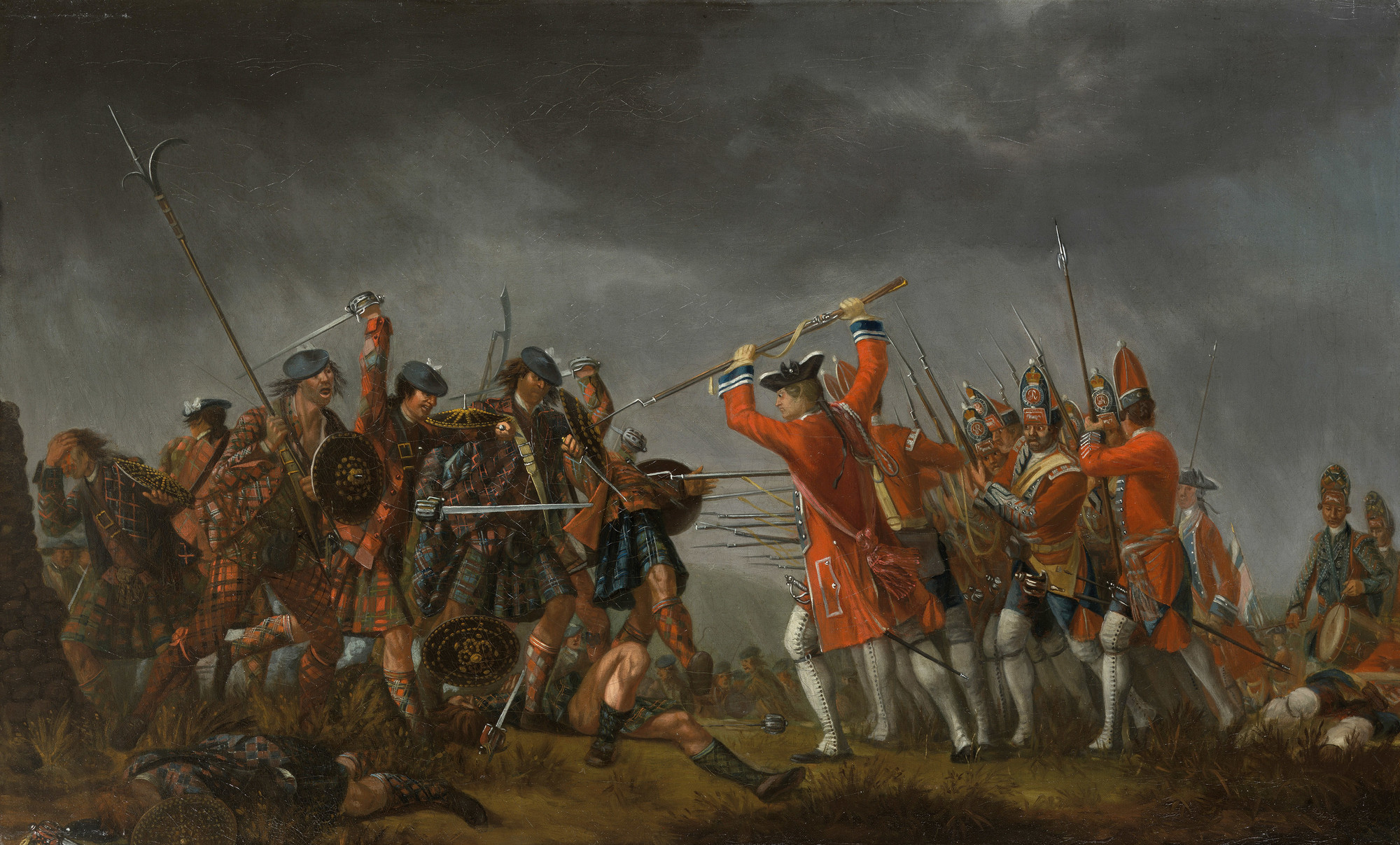
The extinction of the Scottish clan system came with the defeat of the clansmen at the Battle of Culloden in 1746.

- 1740: Frederick the Great comes to power in Prussia.
- 1740: Great Awakening in New England with evangelist George Whitefield.
- 1740: The British captured St. Augustine, Florida but lose to the Spanish during the Siege of St. Augustine.
- 1740–1741: Famine in Ireland kills ten percent of the population.
- 1740–1748: War of the Austrian Succession.
- 1740: 9 October, a massacre of Batavia's ethnic Chinese begins after they are suspected by the VOC of planning a rebellion; approximately 10,000 are killed and the Chinese quarter is burned.
- 1741: Russians begin settling the Aleutian Islands.
- 1741: Pope Benedict XIV issues Immensa Pastorum principis against slavery.
- 1742: The rebellion of Juan Santos Atahualpa.
- 1742: Marvel's Mill, the first water-powered cotton mill, begins operation in England.
- 1743: The capital of the Sultanate of Mataram Kartasura fell under the Geger Pecinan uprising — Raden Mas Garendi (Sunan Kuning) led Chinese mercenaries in revolt against Pakubuwono II.
- 1744: The First Saudi State is founded by Mohammed Ibn Saud.
- 1744: The French attempt to restart the Jacobite rebellion fails.
- 1744–1748: The First Carnatic War is fought between the British, the French, the Marathas, and Mysore in India.
- 1745: Second Jacobite rising is begun by Charles Edward Stuart in Scotland.
- 1745: 17 February, Pakubuwono II establishes a new kraton in Sala village, along with Surakarta Sunanate.
- 1747: Ahmed Shah Durrani founds the Durrani Empire in modern-day Afghanistan.
- 1748: The Treaty of Aix-La-Chapelle ends the War of the Austrian Succession and First Carnatic War.
- 1748–1754: The Second Carnatic War is fought between the British, the French, the Marathas, and Mysore in India.

== 1750s ==
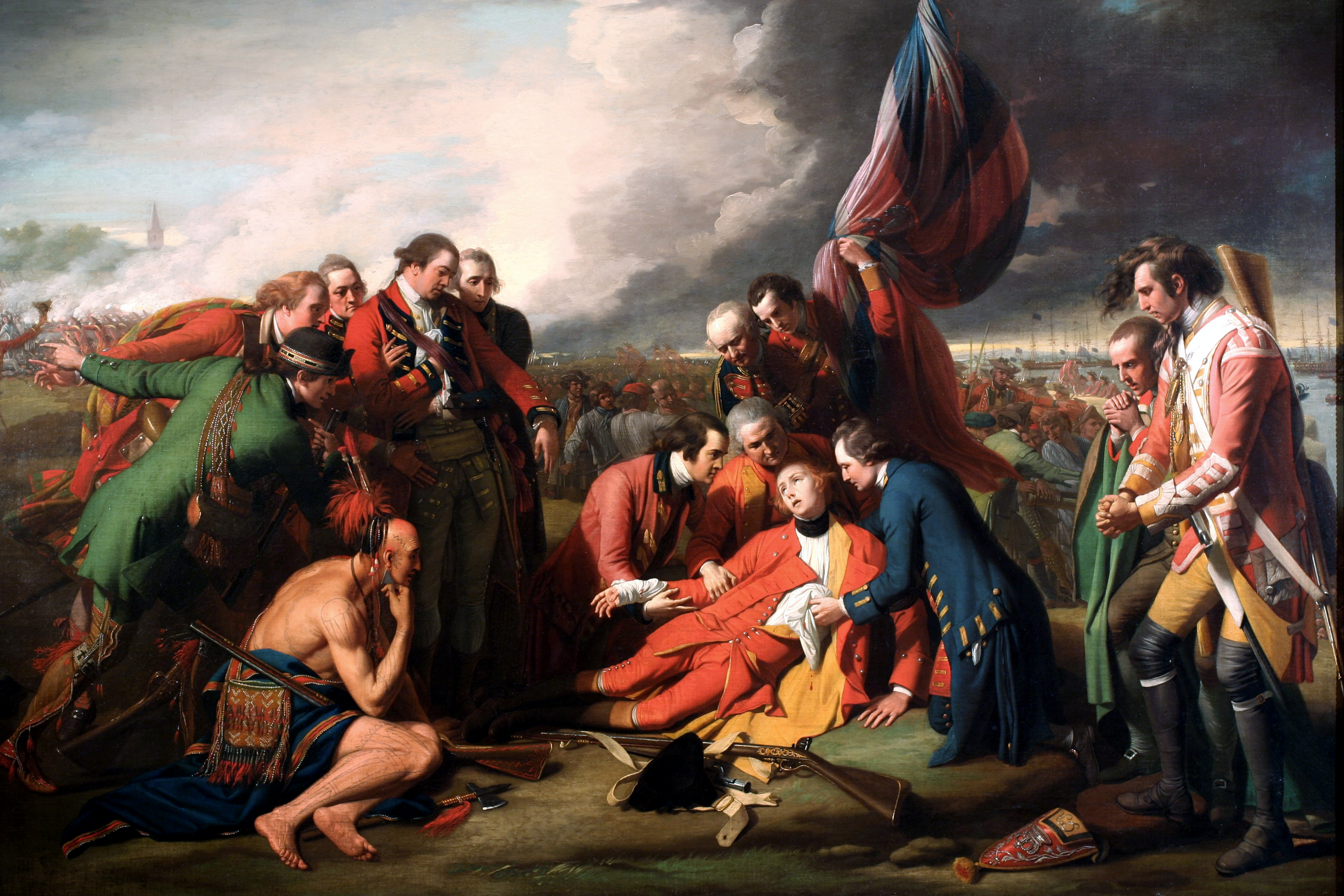
The Death of General Wolfe.

- 1750: Peak of the Little Ice Age.
- 1754: The Treaty of Pondicherry ends the Second Carnatic War and recognizes Muhammed Ali Khan Wallajah as Nawab of the Carnatic.
- 1754: King's College is founded by a royal charter of George II of Great Britain.
- 1754–1763: The French and Indian War, the North American chapter of the Seven Years' War, is fought in colonial North America, mostly by the French and their allies against the English and their allies.
- 1755: The Lisbon earthquake occurs.
- 1755–1763: The Great Upheaval forces transfer of the French Acadian population from Nova Scotia and New Brunswick.
- 1755: 13 February, the Treaty of Giyanti is signed, effectively partitioning the Mataram Sultanate; the VOC recognizes Mangkubumi as Sultan Hamengkubuwana I, who rules half of Central Java; Hamengkubuwana I then establishes Yogyakarta Sultanate, moves to Yogya and renames the city Yogyakarta.
- 1755: Demand-Supply by Richard Cantillon published in French.
- 1756–1763: The Seven Years' War is fought among European powers in various theaters around the world.
- 1756: Birth of Wolfgang Amadeus Mozart
- 1756–1763: The Third Carnatic War is fought between the British, the French, the Marathas, and Mysore in India.
- 1757: The Battle of Plassey signals the beginning of formal British rule in India after years of commercial activity under the auspices of the East India Company.
- 1757: 17 March, Salatiga treaty between Prince Sambernyawa with Pakubuwono III and Hamengkubuwono I further partitions the remnant of Mataram Sultanate; the Mangkunegaran Grand Duchy is established.
- 1758: British colonel James Wolfe issues Wolfe's Manifesto.
- 1759: French and Indian War: French commander Louis-Joseph de Montcalm and British commander James Wolfe die during the Battle of the Plains of Abraham.

== 1760s ==
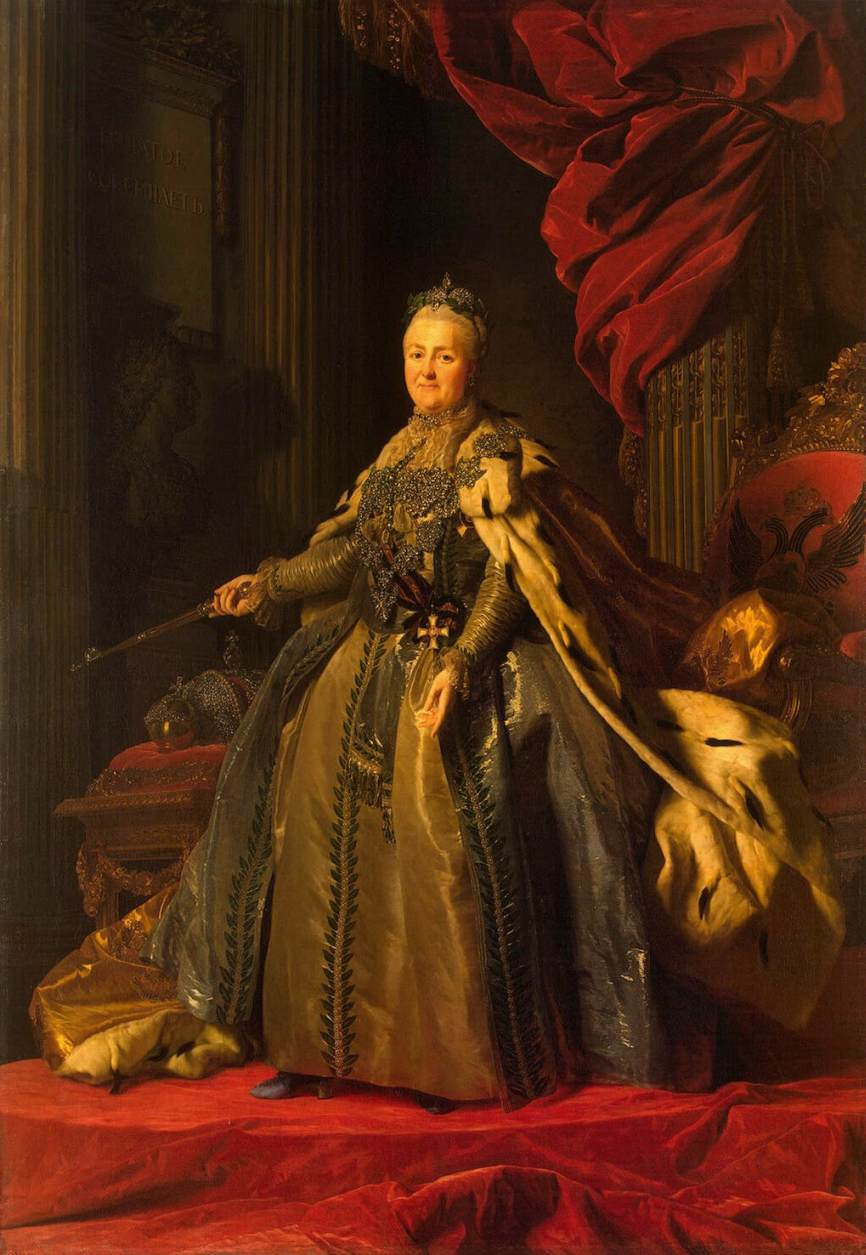
Catherine the Great, Empress of Russia.

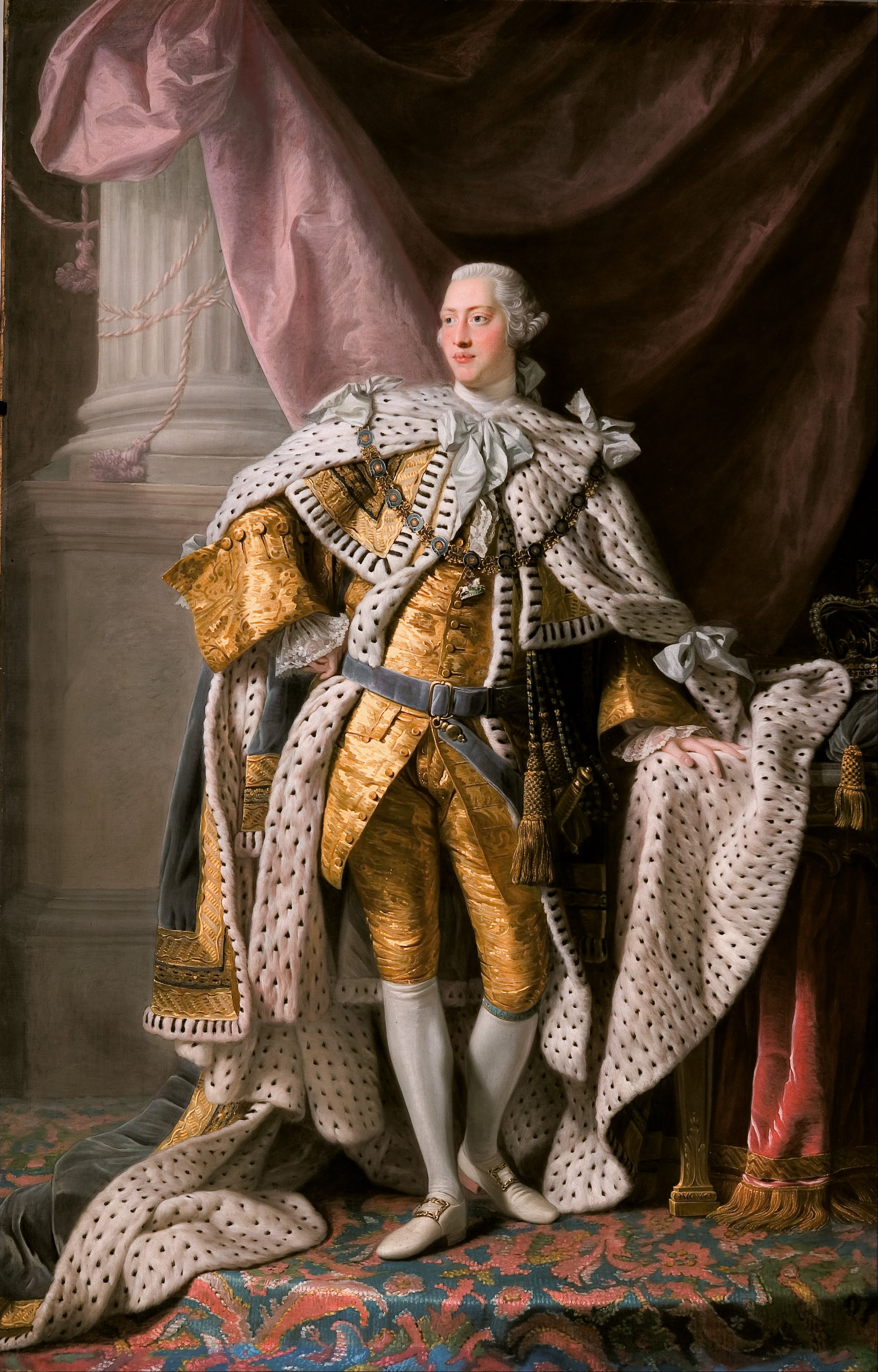
George III, King of Great Britain.

- 1760: George III becomes King of Britain. Beginning of industrial revolution in Great Britain
- 1760: Zand dynasty is founded in Iran.
- 1761: Marine chronometer invented.
- 1761: Maratha Empire defeated at Battle of Panipat.
- 1762–1796: Reign of Catherine the Great of Russia.
- 1763: The Treaty of Paris ends the Seven Years' War and Third Carnatic War.
- 1763: Kingdom of Mysore conquers the Kingdom of Keladi.
- 1763: Echelon Formation used by Frederick the Great of Prussia.
- 1765: The Stamp Act is introduced into the American colonies by the British Parliament.
- 1766: Christian VII becomes king of Denmark. He was king of Denmark to 1808.
- 1766–1799: Anglo-Mysore Wars.
- 1767: Burmese conquer the Ayutthaya Kingdom.
- 1767: Suppression of the Society of Jesus from the Spanish Empire.
- 1768: Gurkhas conquer Nepal.
- 1768–1772: War of the Bar Confederation.
- 1768–1774: Russo-Turkish War.
- 1768: Imperial Leather commissioned by Count Orlov.
- 1769: The Corsican War of Independence ends, after the French Conquest of Corsica. Napoleon is also born on Corsica in 1769, and becomes a natural-born French citizen.
- 1769: Spanish missionaries establish the first of 21 missions in California.
- 1769–1770: James Cook explores and maps New Zealand and Australia.
- 1769–1773: The Bengal famine of 1770 kills one-third of the Bengal population.
- 1769: French expeditions capture clove plants in Ambon, ending the VOC monopoly of the plant. (to 1772)
- 1769: Court Factor title gained by Mayer Amschel Rothschild.

== 1770s ==
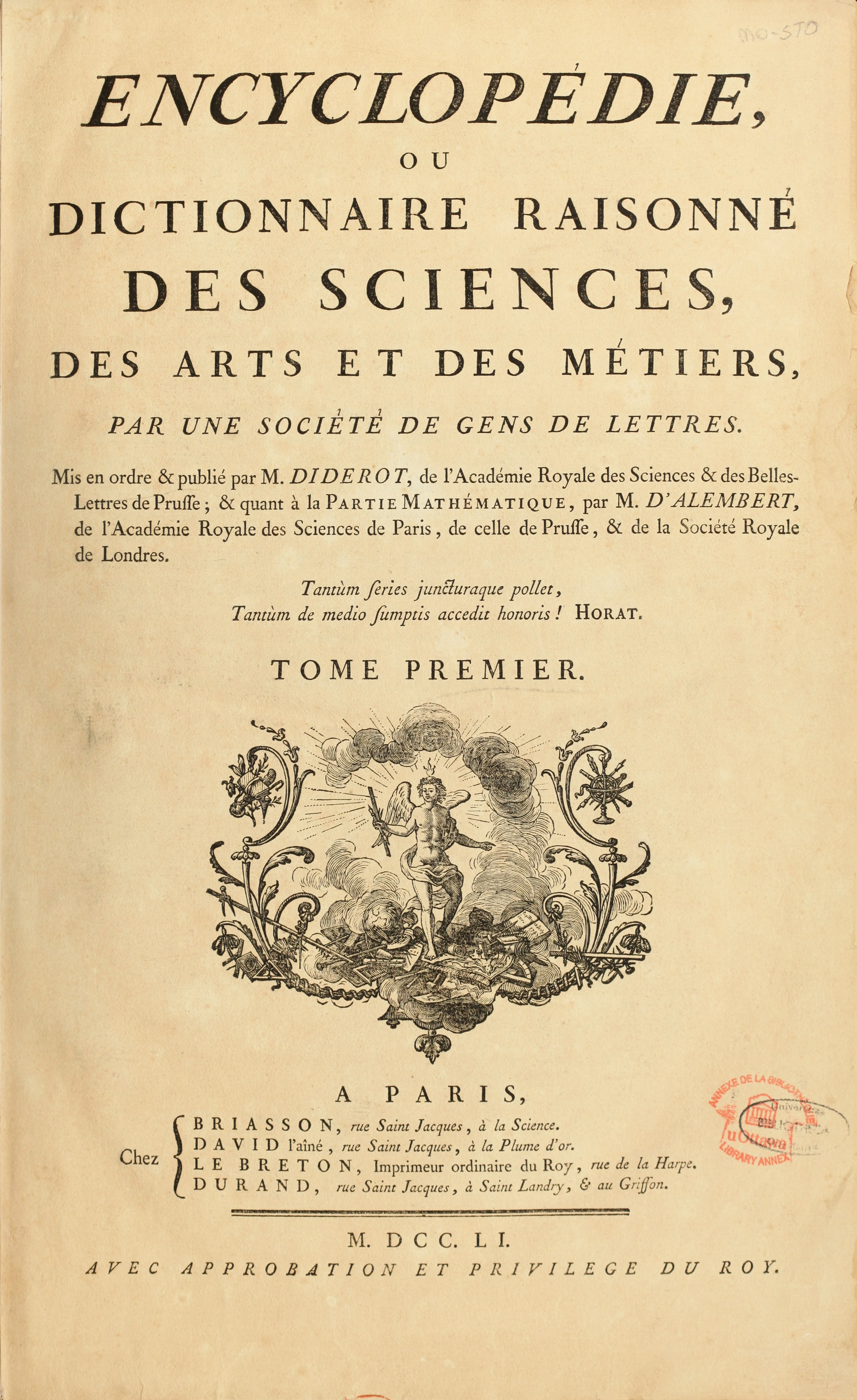
Encyclopédie, ou dictionnaire raisonné des sciences, des arts et des métiers

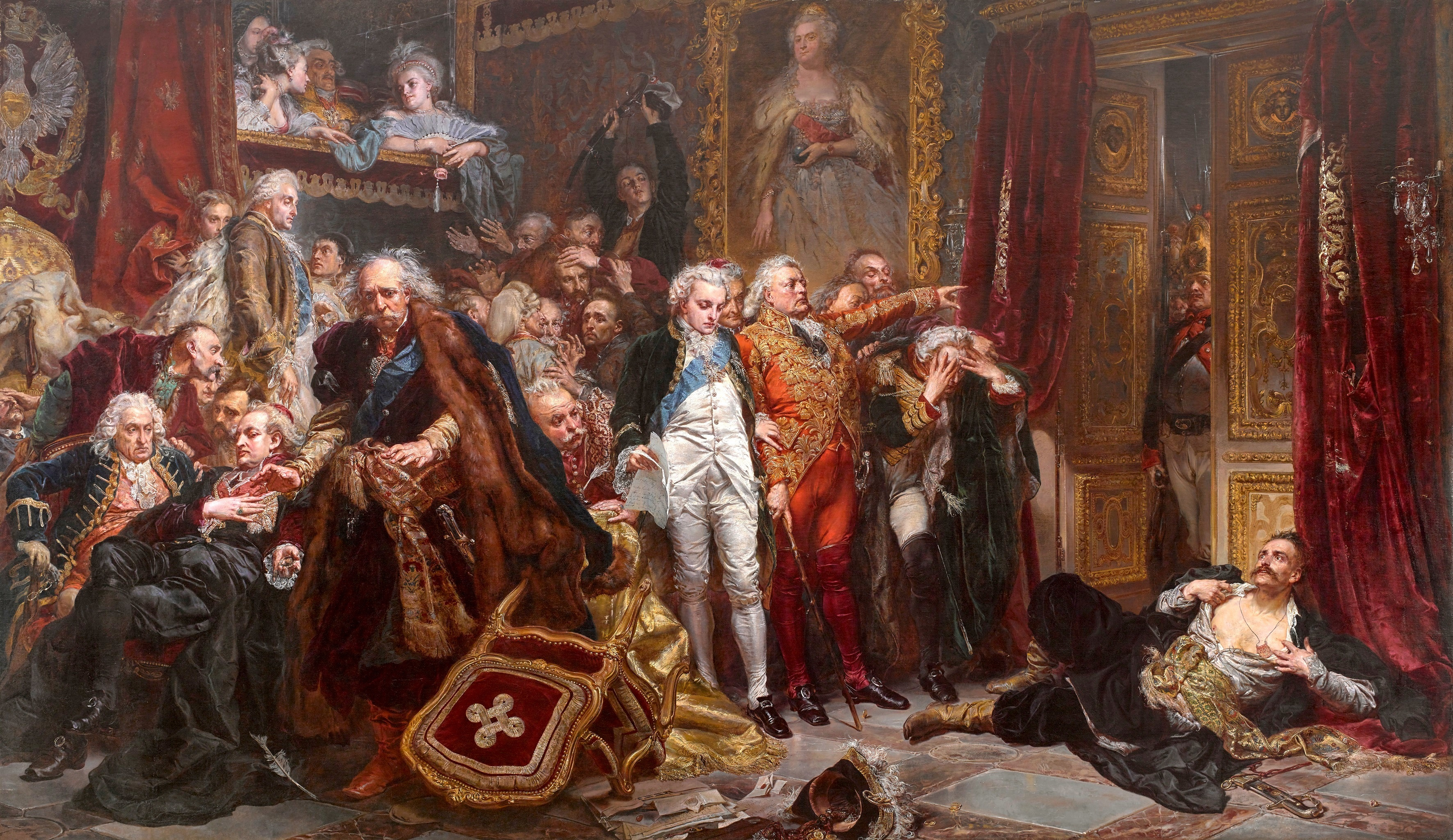
Rejtan and the Partitions of Poland on a painting by Jan Matejko.

- 1770: Birth of Ludwig van Beethoven
- 1770: James Cook claims the East Coast of Australia (New South Wales) for Great Britain.
- 1770: 5 March, the Boston Massacre.
- 1770–1771: Famine in Czech lands kills hundreds of thousands.
- 1770: James Cook stops at Onrust Island in the Bay of Batavia for repairs to his ship Endeavour on his voyage around the world.
- 1771: The Plague Riot in Moscow.
- 1771: Richard Arkwright and his partners build the world's first water-powered mill at Cromford.
- 1772: Reformer Johann Friedrich Struensee executed in Denmark.
- 1772: Gustav III of Sweden stages a coup d'état, becoming almost an absolute monarch. He promulgates the Instrument of Government (1772).
- 1772–1775: Maratha succession crisis following the death of Peshwa Madhavrao I: conflict between Raghunathrao and the regency supporting Madhavrao II.
- 1772–1795: The Partitions of Poland end the Polish–Lithuanian Commonwealth and erase Poland from the map for 123 years.
- 1773–1775: Pugachev's Rebellion, the largest peasant revolt in Russian history.
- 1773: East India Company starts operations in Bengal to smuggle opium into China.
- 1773: 16 December, the Boston Tea Party.
- 1775: John Harrison H4 and Larcum Kendall K1 marine chronometers are used to measure longitude by James Cook on his second voyage (1772–1775).
- 1775–1782: First Anglo-Maratha War.
- 1775–1783: American Revolutionary War.
- 1776: Illuminati founded by Adam Weishaupt.
- 1776: The Lee Resolution and United States Declaration of Independence are adopted by the Second Continental Congress in Philadelphia.
- 1776: Adam Smith publishes The Wealth of Nations.
- 1778: Tây Sơn dynasty was established in Vietnam.
- 1778: James Cook becomes the first European to land on the Hawaiian Islands.
- 1778: 24 April, the Royal Batavian Society of Arts and Sciences is established by a group of Dutch intellectuals; this institution is a pioneer of scientific efforts in Indonesia and the founder of the National Museum of Indonesia.
- 1779: Captain James Cook is killed by Hawaiian natives at Kealakekua Bay, following an attempted kidnapping and ransoming of ruling chief, Kalaniʻōpuʻu in return for a stolen boat.
- 1779–1879: Xhosa Wars between British and Boer settlers and the Xhosas in the South African Republic.

== 1780s ==
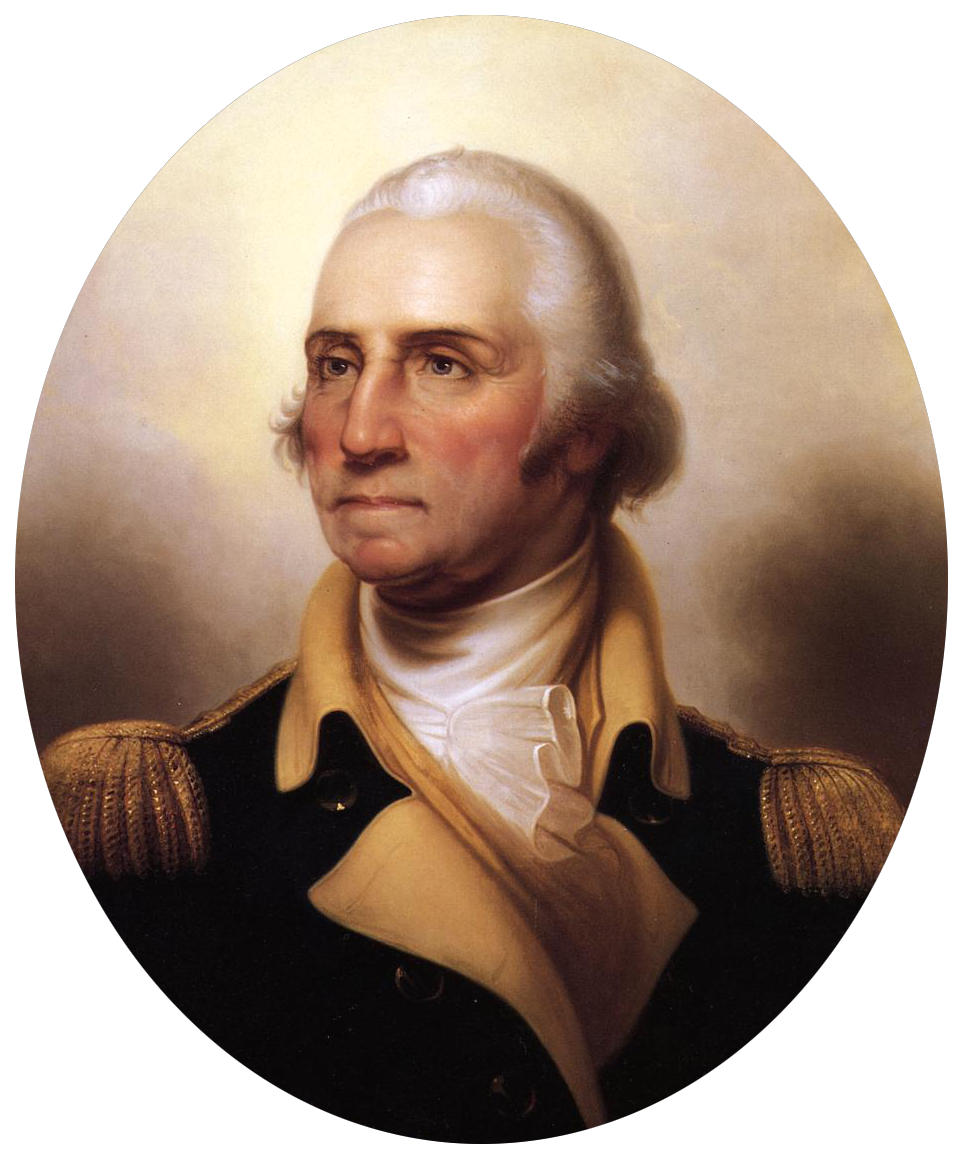
George Washington.

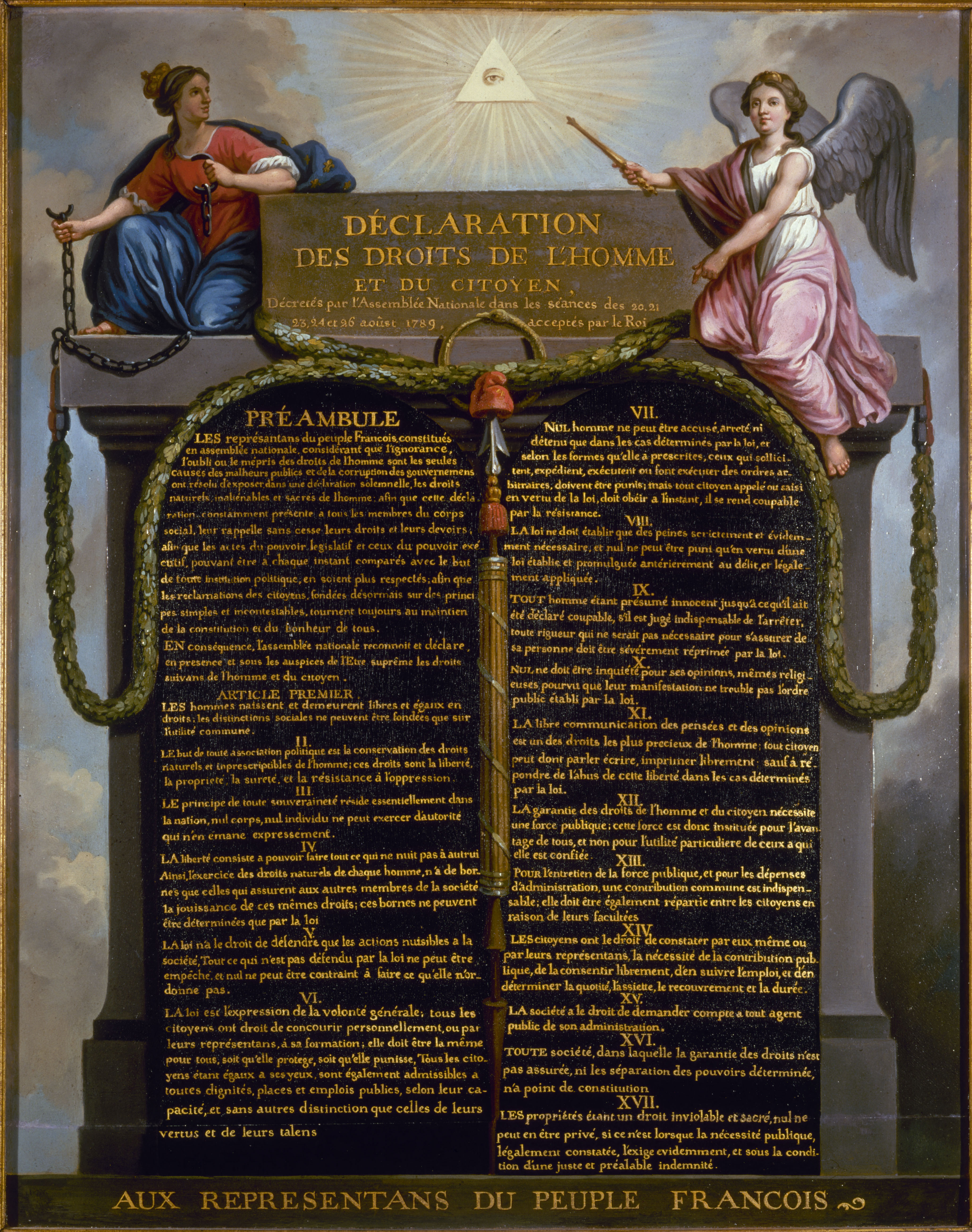
Declaration of the Rights of Man and of the Citizen.

- 1780: Outbreak of the indigenous rebellion against Spanish colonization led by Túpac Amaru II in Peru.
- 1781: The city of Los Angeles is founded by Spanish settlers.
- 1781: Immanuel Kant publishes his first critique: the Critique of Pure Reason.
- 1781–1785: Serfdom is abolished in the Austrian monarchy (first step; second step in 1848).
- 1783: Montgolfier brothers invent hot air balloon.
- 1783: Famine in Iceland, caused by the eruption of the Laki volcano.
- 1783: Russian Empire annexes the Crimean Khanate.
- 1783: The Treaty of Paris formally ends the American Revolutionary War.
- 1785–1791: Imam Sheikh Mansur, a Chechen warrior and Muslim mystic, leads a coalition of Muslim Caucasian tribes from throughout the Caucasus in a holy war against Russian settlers and military bases in the Caucasus, as well as against local traditionalists, who followed the traditional customs and common law (Adat) rather than the theocratic Sharia.
- 1785–1795: The Northwest Indian War is fought between the United States and Native Americans.
- 1786: Frederick the Great dies without issue and is succeeded as King of Prussia by his nephew, Frederick William II.
- 1787: The United States Constitution is written in Philadelphia and submitted to the states for ratification.
- 1787: Freed slaves from London establish Freetown in present-day Sierra Leone.
- 1787: Kansei Reforms instituted in Japan by Matsudaira Sadanobu.
- 1787–1792: Russo-Turkish War.
- 1788: First French Quaker community established in Congénies.
- 1788: The Act of Guarantee is presented to William V, Prince of Orange, the last Stadtholder of the Dutch Republic.
- 1788: First permanent European settlement established in Australia by Britain at Sydney.
- 1788–1790: Russo-Swedish War (1788–1790).
- 1788: New Hampshire becomes the 9th state to ratify the United States Constitution, and by the terms of Article VII it takes effect.
- 1788–1789: Inconfidência Mineira, conspiracy against the colonial authorities in Brazil.
- 1789: George Washington is elected the first President of the United States. Inaugurated on April 30, he serves until 1797.
- 1789: Declaration of the Rights of Man and of the Citizen adopted.
- 1789: Great Britain and Spain dispute the Nootka Sound during the Nootka Crisis.
- 1789–1799: French Revolution.

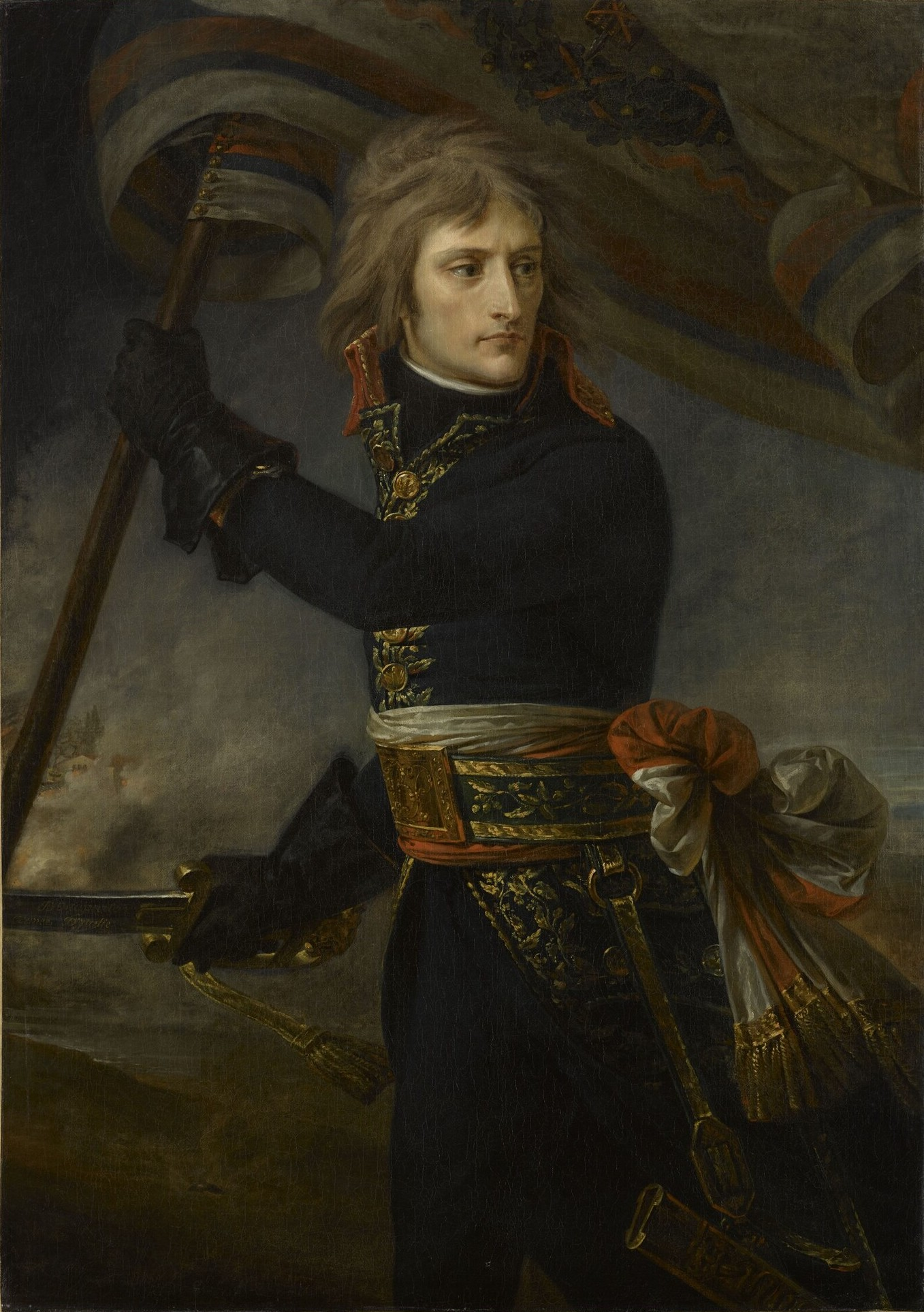
Napoleon at the Bridge of the Arcole.

- 1789: The Liège Revolution.
- 1789: The Brabant Revolution.

== 1790s ==
- 1790s: Canal Mania in England and Wales.
- 1790: The United States of Belgium is proclaimed following the Brabant Revolution.
- 1790: Suppression of the United Belgian States and re-establishment of Austrian control.
- 1790: Establishment of the Polish-Prussian Pact.
- 1791: The Constitutional Act (or Canada Act) creates the two provinces of Upper and Lower Canada in British North America.
- 1791: The United States Bill of Rights is ratified.
- 1791: Suppression of the Liège Revolution by Austrian forces and re-establishment of the Prince-Bishopric of Liège.
- 1791–1795: George Vancouver explores the world during the Vancouver Expedition.
- 1791–1804: The Haitian Revolution.
- 1791: Surprise Symphony written by Haydn.
- 1792–1802: The French Revolutionary Wars lead into the Napoleonic Wars, which last from 1803–1815.
- 1792: The New York Stock & Exchange Board is founded.
- 1792: Polish–Russian War of 1792.
- 1792: King Gustav III of Sweden is assassinated by a conspiracy of noblemen.
- 1792: March, Hamengkubuwana I dies.
- 1793: Former King Louis XVI of France and his wife Marie Antoinette are guillotined. Louis is executed in January, Marie Antoinette in October.
- 1793: Upper Canada bans slavery.
- 1793: The largest yellow fever epidemic in American history kills as many as 5,000 people in Philadelphia, roughly 10% of the population.
- 1793–1796: Revolt in the Vendée against the French Republic at the time of the Revolution.
- 1794–1816: The Hawkesbury and Nepean Wars, which were a series of incidents between settlers and New South Wales Corps and the Aboriginal Australian clans of the Hawkesbury river in Sydney, Australia.
- 1794: Polish revolt.
- 1794: Jay's Treaty is concluded between Great Britain and the United States, by which the Western outposts in the Great Lakes are returned to the U.S. and commerce between the two countries is regulated.
- 1794: Qajar dynasty founded in Iran after replacing the Zand dynasty.
- 1794: The Mysteries of Udolpho by Ann Radcliffe published.
- 1795: Mohammad Khan Qajar razes Tbilisi to the ground.
- 1795: Establishment of the French-backed Batavian Republic in present-day Netherlands.
- 1795: Pinckney's Treaty between the United States and Spain grants the Mississippi Territory to the U.S.
- 1795: The Marseillaise is officially adopted as the French national anthem.
- 1795: Kamehameha I of the Island of Hawaii defeats the Oahuans at the Battle of Nu'uanu.
- 1796: Edward Jenner administers the first smallpox vaccination; smallpox killed an estimated 400,000 Europeans each year during the 18th century, including five reigning monarchs.
- 1796: War of the First Coalition: The Battle of Montenotte marks Napoleon Bonaparte's first victory as an army commander.
- 1796: The British eject the Dutch from Ceylon.
- 1796: Mungo Park, backed by the African Association, is the first European to set eyes on the Niger River in Africa.
- 1796–1804: The White Lotus Rebellion against the Manchu dynasty in China.
- 1796: Trinidad put under British rule.
- 1797: John Adams is inaugurated on March 4 as President of the United States following the 1796 United States presidential election. The peaceful transfer of power from the Washington administration to Adams sets a precedent for relinquishing executive power and transferring it to a new administration.
- 1797: Napoleon's invasion and partition of the Republic of Venice ends over 1,000 years of independence for the Serene Republic.
- 1798: The Irish Rebellion fails to overthrow British rule in Ireland.
- 1798–1800: The Quasi-War is fought between the United States and France.
- 1799: Napoleon stages a coup d'état and becomes First Consul of France.
- 1799: Dutch East India Company is dissolved.
- 1799: The assassination of the 14th Tu'i Kanokupolu, Tukuʻaho, plunges Tonga into half a century of civil war.
- 1799: Tipu Sultan is killed in a battle with British forces.

== 1800 ==
- The bankrupt Dutch East India Company (VOC) is formally dissolved and the nationalised Dutch East Indies are established.
