= Ku Klux Klan in Southern Illinois =

The Ku Klux Klan in Southern Illinois operated between 1867 and 1875 in seven counties—Franklin, Williamson, Jackson, Saline, Johnson, Union, and Pope. The "worst Klan years" were in 1874 and 1875.

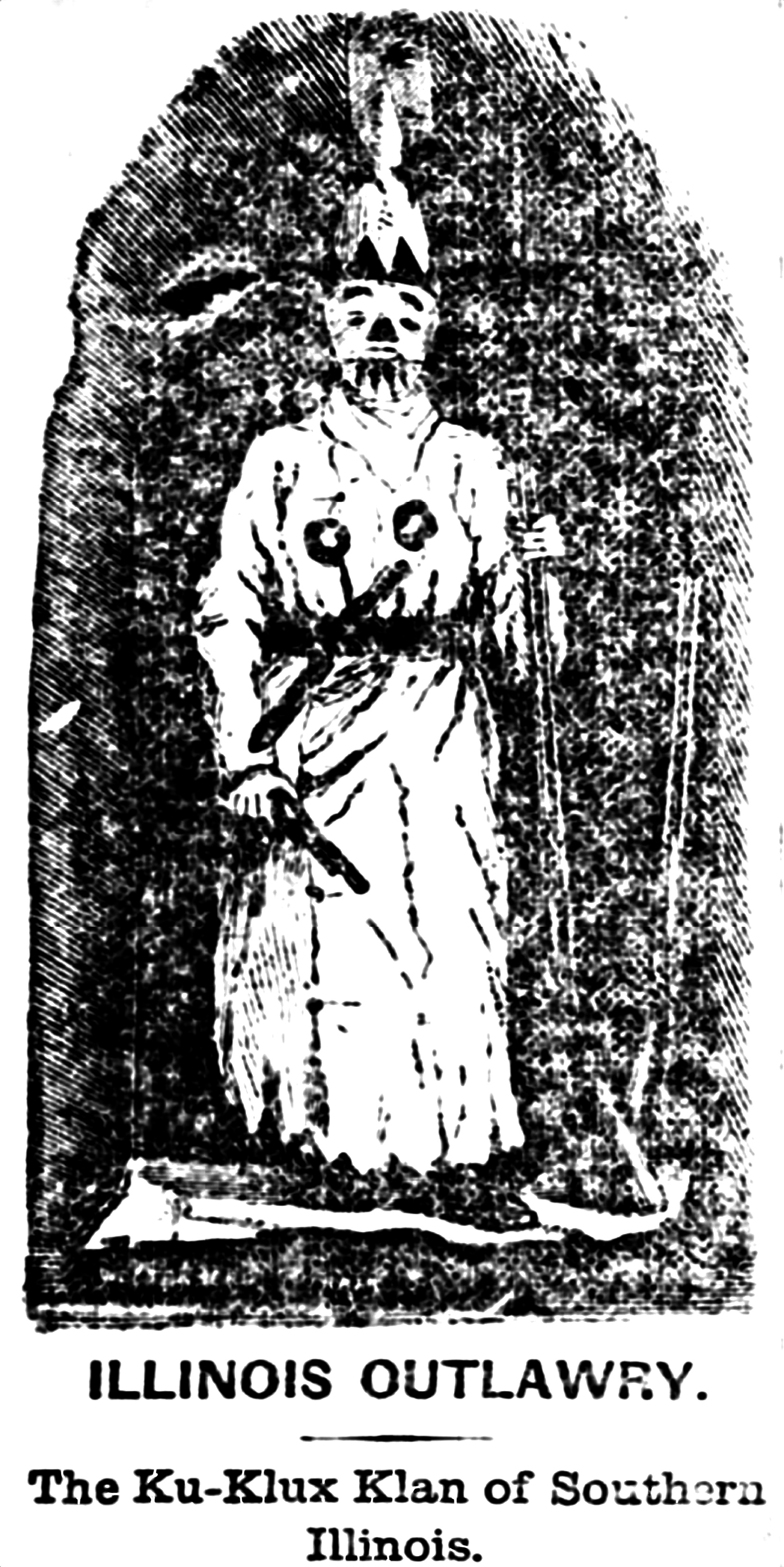
Garb and weapons of the Ku-Klux Klan in Southern Illinois, as posed for Joseph A. Dacus of the Missouri Republican, in August 1875

The earliest date attributed to this group was 1867. The organizer was reputed to be Aaron Neal of Franklin County, who, according to one Klansman, had been a member of the first KKK, founded in Pulaski, Tennessee, on December 24, 1865.

== Early crimes ==
History professor Edgar F. Raines Jr. wrote that: "Rumor credited the Klan with several unsolved murders, but the first violent action that can be attributed to the organization occurred on the night of December 14, 1871, when about forty men 'under military discipline' descended upon the farm of John Baker" on the Williamson-Franklin county line. They drove his family off, and shortly after, they burned two other farmhouses and frightened away the residents.

The Klan also threatened a Williamson County man who had gained title to the properties of tax-delinquent farmers; "Under threat of guest-of-honor status at a lynching", Raines wrote, the man returned the properties to the previous owners.

In 1872, disguised men took a Franklin County farmer named Adams into the woods and whipped him. Seventeen were arrested, but they escaped trial because there was only one witness against them.

On July 20, night riders visited the homes of William M. Reed and his neighbors about five miles northeast of Marion. The Egyptian Press newspaper reported on July 23, 1872, that the intruders then "called upon one Mr. Smith to dance, which he did very promptly. They left orders for other parties to go to work, to stay at home and not to leave, except on special business."

=== Isaac Vancil ===
The lynching of Isaac Vancil took place on April 22, 1872, near Herrin's Prairie in Williamson County, Illinois. The first reports said that "Vancil was an old man of 72, quite wealthy, and the outrage creates great excitement in the country." Vancil was first cousin to Illinois Lieutenant-Governor John Dougherty.

Vancil, the first white man born in Williamson County, lived on the Big Muddy River. His first visit from the Klan was in March 1872, "when he was ordered to 'dispose of his property in a given manner,' to cease visiting his mistresses, and to produce a young hired hand who had suddenly disappeared." Another source said Vancil had been accused of "harboring a woman who had separated from her husband."

According to local historian Milo Erwin, on April 15, 1872, Vancil received a written message to leave the county or be killed.

He did not obey the order, and on the night of the 22nd, ten men in disguise of Ku-Klux rode up to the house, took him out about a mile down the river bottom, and put a skinned pole in the forks of two saplings and hung him, and left him hanging. Next morning he was found still, blank and lifeless.

Vancil's murder caused a furor. Governor John M. Palmer offered a thousand-dollar reward for the arrest of the culprits and a hundred dollars for the arrest of any other Klansman. Fifteen Williamson County men were indicted for but acquitted of murder and other Klan activities. Some were tried in federal district court under the 1867 Ku Klux Klan Act but escaped punishment because the two prosecution witnesses were murdered.

== Later crimes ==
In Jackson County, Illinois, State's Attorney A.R. Pugh said that "a regular gang of Ku Klux with masks and other paraphornalia" [sic] had invaded his county, and in March 1874 he said that "They have Horse whipped some citizens[,] and I have every reason [to believe] that in one instance death has been the consequence of their brutality." Nothing could be done under state law, which did not forbid membership in the Klan.

In summer 1874, other night riders were reported in Saline and Williamson counties, and on the night of October 23 of that year, twenty Klansmen "in full regalia" visited the home of Henry G. Carter, north of Marion, and ordered him to leave the county. A gun battle erupted between the Carter family and the Klansmen. A few days later, some fifty men gathered at a church and ordered five of the Carters to leave the county or be hanged.

During the winter of 1874-75, a dozen Williamson County men were whipped and ordered to leave the area. Newspaper editors received threatening letters. In spring 1875, Klansmen took people from their Jackson County homes and whipped them. The greatest activity by August was in the north along the St. Louis and Cairo Railroad around Ava, Illinois, robbery being the main motive.

== The Maddox night raid ==
At 2 a.m. August 17, 1875, a posse of armed men led by Sheriff James F. Mason awaited outside the farmhouse of County Commissioner Jack Maddox. Soon a group of armed and masked men approached on horseback. Shots were fired, and one rider, John Duckworth, tumbled from his horse. The others fled. The next morning, bloodied masks and robes were found on roads nearby. Suspects were hunted down and arrested.

== End of the Southern Illinois Klan ==
The turning point in attempts to suppress the Klan coincided with a letter to Governor Beveridge from M.H. Stephens, a resident of Murphysboro, in which Stephens assured the governor he would give evidence against the "outlaws." Historian Raines wrote: "The organization faded from public view, not to reappear until the 1920s, when Williamson, Franklin, Saline, and Jackson counties would become centers of the second, even stronger, Klan."

== Costume ==
At the beginning, according to Raines, "the night riders did not deign to costume themselves, counting on the terror they created to shield their identity. By the 1870s, however, they had evolved the elaborate costume and ritual associated with their brethren to the south." The uniform consisted of a "long white coat trimmed with black, a white cape, also a white cap with a cape reaching below the shoulders — all trimmed with black."

Journalist Joseph A. Dacus wrote in 1875 that the "night angels" who assaulted a bedridden James Brown wore "peaked caps, white robes, ghastly masks, and other infernal paraphrenalia," and a correspondent for the New York Daily Herald described the garb as "white masks, fantastically daubed with black at the openings for eyes and mouth, and their heads were surmounted by long, peaked hats, also of white cloth." Brown died after the attack.

On August 19, 1875, Dacus took four photographs of an unidentified man dressed in "bloody garb" retrieved after the failed raid on the Maddox farm. The subject, with a dirk or club stuck in his belt, held a shotgun and pistol. Another shotgun leaned against a wall. One of the photos was printed as a woodcut in the St. Louis Republican on August 23, 1875, and reprinted by the same newspaper on October 6, 1878.

== See also ==
- Veiled Prophet Parade and Ball for the second use of this woodcut
