= Daniel M. Grissom =

American journalist

Daniel M. Grissom (1829–1930) was an American journalist of the 19th century.

== Personal life ==
Grissom, who was born in Daviess County, Kentucky, was the son of Alfred Grissom, a tailor, and Abrilla or Adaline Pittman, 13 years his junior. He studied at Cumberland University, Tennessee, and he became a lawyer. He moved to St. Louis, Missouri, in 1842, when he was 21.

In the 1880 census, Grissom was living in Carondelet Township, adjoining Kirkwood, Missouri, with his wife, Frances R. Grissom. The 1910 census stated he was widowed.

In 1930 he was feted with a party to mark his 100th birthday in a Kirkwood retirement home, where he lived for 18 years. He died at the age of 101 on May 17, 1930, and was buried in Kirkwood Cemetery.

== Professional life ==
=== Editing ===
Grissom's initial journalistic job, in 1842 or shortly thereafter, was with the St. Louis Evening News, where he first covered a lecture series at the library. He was soon made editor, a position he held for ten years.

An interviewer wrote of him in 1927: "As a boy[,] he had felt the urge to write[,] and the career of a journalist attracted him strongly. . . . Grissom had the somewhat detached, impersonal attitude toward events often found in newspaper men."

In September 1861, the first year of the American Civil War, he and Charles G. Ramsey, proprietor of the Evening News, were arrested and the newspaper was ordered repressed . The two were released and the suppression was lifted when "satisfactory guarantees" were made to the commanding general of Union forces that the newspaper "should not hereafter contain articles of a character calculated to impede the operations of the Government or impair the efficiency of the operations of the army of the West."

He continued as editor when the St. Louis Union bought the News and the name of the combined newspapers was changed to Evening Dispatch. Some "five or six years later" he moved to the Missouri Republican, where he became assistant editor to William Hyde.

In 1863, while editor of the Union, Grissom was nominated to be state printer of Missouri but was not chosen. The Chicago Tribune at that time referred to him as a "conservative" and to his successful opponent, a Dr. Curry, editor of the State Times, as a "radical."

St. Louis city directories listed Grissom as an editor working for the Dispatch in 1865 and the Republican in 1878 and 1880.

Historian Walter B. Stevens said of him in 1911:

He was at home in every field of editorial comment. What he wrote was easy to read. The style was virile and straightforward. There was no striving after effect in words.

By 1888, Grissom had retired; he was lauded that year in a speech by former Republican editor William Hyde, who said that Grissom, then living in Kirkwood, had done more "all-round work than any other man who ever wielded the pen in St. Louis."

=== Reporting ===
==== Lincoln-Douglas ====
Grissom covered one of the debates between Abraham Lincoln and Stephen A. Douglas, in Alton, Illinois, in 1858. In 1928, he recalled:

Douglas, styled the "Little Giant,' was a small man scarcely 5 feet 4 inches, with broad shoulders and a stalwart neck. His head was massive and majestic-looking and his voice could deepen into a roar. He was well groomed and prosperous-looking and strode the stage as one at ease. At all times he seemed sure of himself.

Lincoln's clothes hung loosely on his 6-foot-4-inch frame. His small, twinkling gray eyes shone from beneath shaggy brows. . . . Sometimes he seemed all legs and feet and again all hands and neck. He had no stage manners, no studied art. His speech was full of short, homely words. . . . His very loneliness, modest bearing, air of mingled sadness and sincerity excited sympathy and won the hearts of the quiet, plain people.

==== Gasconade Bridge ====
As a journalist with the St. Louis Evening News, Grissom was seated in the last car of the Pacific Railroad train involved in the Gasconade Bridge train disaster of 1855, in which more than thirty people were killed when a bridge collapsed under it. He recalled seventy-two years later:

Suddenly there was an awful crash, a sickening lurch—another—another. We were moving forward jerkily, sickeningly. Horrid sounds came from ahead. We realized in a flash what must have happened—the bridge was gone—we were being pulled into the river by the weight of the cars ahead, which had already crashed over the bank! Then—our car was going, too. The violent motion threw us to the floor. . . .

When a relief train from St. Louis came to our aid[,] it was a very different kind of crowd . . . Hardly a word was spoken as we leaned our heads upon our hands, some uttering groans and low cries of despair caused by their own sufferings or the realization of the loss of friend or relative in the disaster.

=== Other ===
Grissom was captain of Company G of the Ninth Regiment of the Enrolled Missouri Militia, which took action against Shelby in September–October 1863, fought at Booneville, Merrill's Crossing and Dug Ford (near Jonesborough ) and Marshall in October, and was mustered out in November.

At a large public meeting in Courthouse Square on June 17, 1865, Grissom was appointed, along with James O. Broadhead and Fred M. Kretschmar, to a committee to protest against the forcible removal of three judges from their chambers by armed men upon the order of Governor Thomas Clement Fletcher.

In 1892, Grissom produced a "handsome pamphlet of eighty-four pages" for the Merchants Exchange of St. Louis in which he laid out a proposal to Congress for separating the Mississippi River from all the other inland waterways of the United States when making appropriations for improvements.

== Legacy ==
Grissom's Landing on the Ohio River, ten miles below Owensboro, Kentucky, was named for him or his family.

== See also ==
- William Hyde (1836–1898), Grissom's managing editor on the Missouri Republican
- Radicalism and Reconstruction in Missouri
- St. Louis in the American Civil War
