= Nathaniel Paschall =

American journalist (1802–1866)

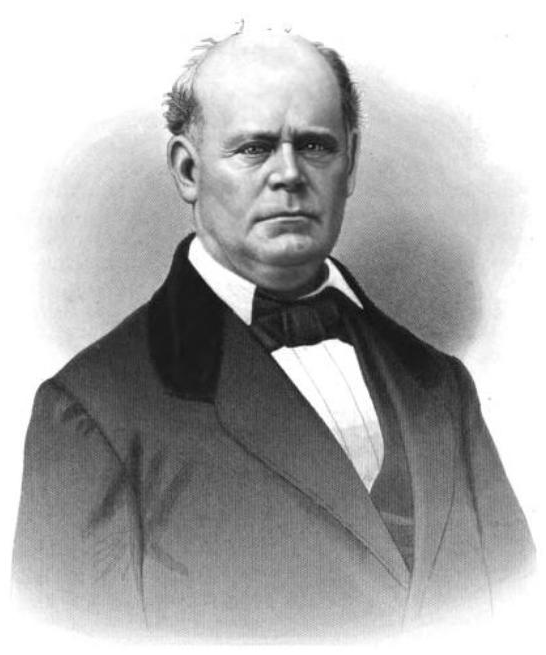
- Born: April 4, 1802; Knoxville, Tennessee
- Died: December 12, 1866 (aged 64); St. Louis, Missouri
- Occupation: Journalist
- Spouse: Martha Eliza Stevens Edgar (m. 1832; died 1859)

Nathaniel Paschall (1802–1866) was an American journalist, the editor of the Missouri Republican.

== Personal life ==
Paschall was born April 4, 1802, in Knoxville, Tennessee. He was schooled in Ste. Genevieve, Missouri.

He and Martha Eliza Stevens Edgar were married on November 27, 1832, in Sangamon, Illinois. In 1850, living with them were Paschal family members Eugenia, age 16; Ada, 14; Cara, 12; Mary, 9; Henry G., 6; George M., 3; and Lizzie C., a baby.

His wife predeceased him in 1859.

He died in St. Louis on December 12, 1866, at the age of 64. The Hotel Paschall was named in his honor the next year.

== Professional and political life ==
Nathaniel Paschall was apprenticed as a "bound boy" early in 1814, when he was not quite twelve, to Joseph Charless of the Missouri Gazette to learn the trade of printing. When his apprenticeship expired in 1823, he continued to work with Edward Charless, the son of the paper's founder and its new owner.

In 1828, he was admitted as a full partner in the business. In 1837 Charless and Paschall sold the enterprise to "Messsrs. Chambers, Harris and George Knapp." In 1840 they founded a new paper called New-Era.

Paschall was elected clerk of the Court of Common Pleas of St. Louis County in 1842.

He was appointed associate editor of the Missouri Republican on January 1, 1844, and when editor A.B. Chambers died in 1854, Paschall succeeded him.

In 1855, he went into partnership with brothers George and John Knapp in the firm George Knapp & Co., which continued publication of the Republican until around 1893.

In 1860, Paschall, as editor of The Republican, successfully placed strong pressure on Claiborne Jackson and Thomas C. Reynolds to declare their support for Stephen Douglas's candidacy for the Presidency of the United States. On January 12, 1861, Paschall met at the East Front of the U.S. Courthouse with jurist Hamilton R. Gamble, banker James E. Yeatman, fur trader Frank Blair, and businessman Robert Campbell, with others, to urge the federal government to refrain from coercion against the states that had already taken steps to secede from the United States. He adopted a conditional unionist stand in the months leading up to the Civil War.

Of Paschall, veteran St. Louis newspaperman William Hyde (who succeeded him as editor), recalled in 1896:

Mr. Paschall had had only what may be styled a newspaper education and equipment, graduating from the printer's case and imbibing the great fund of information contained in what went upon his galleys or columns of type.

But he was a thinker. When he wrote[,] he knew before he began what he was going to write about . . . and wrote it in as few and terse words as possible. In personal demeanor as gentle as a girl, in courage he was as brave as a lion. Anybody could know where he stood on any question.
