= Dora van der Meiden-Coolsma =

Dutch writer (1918–2001)

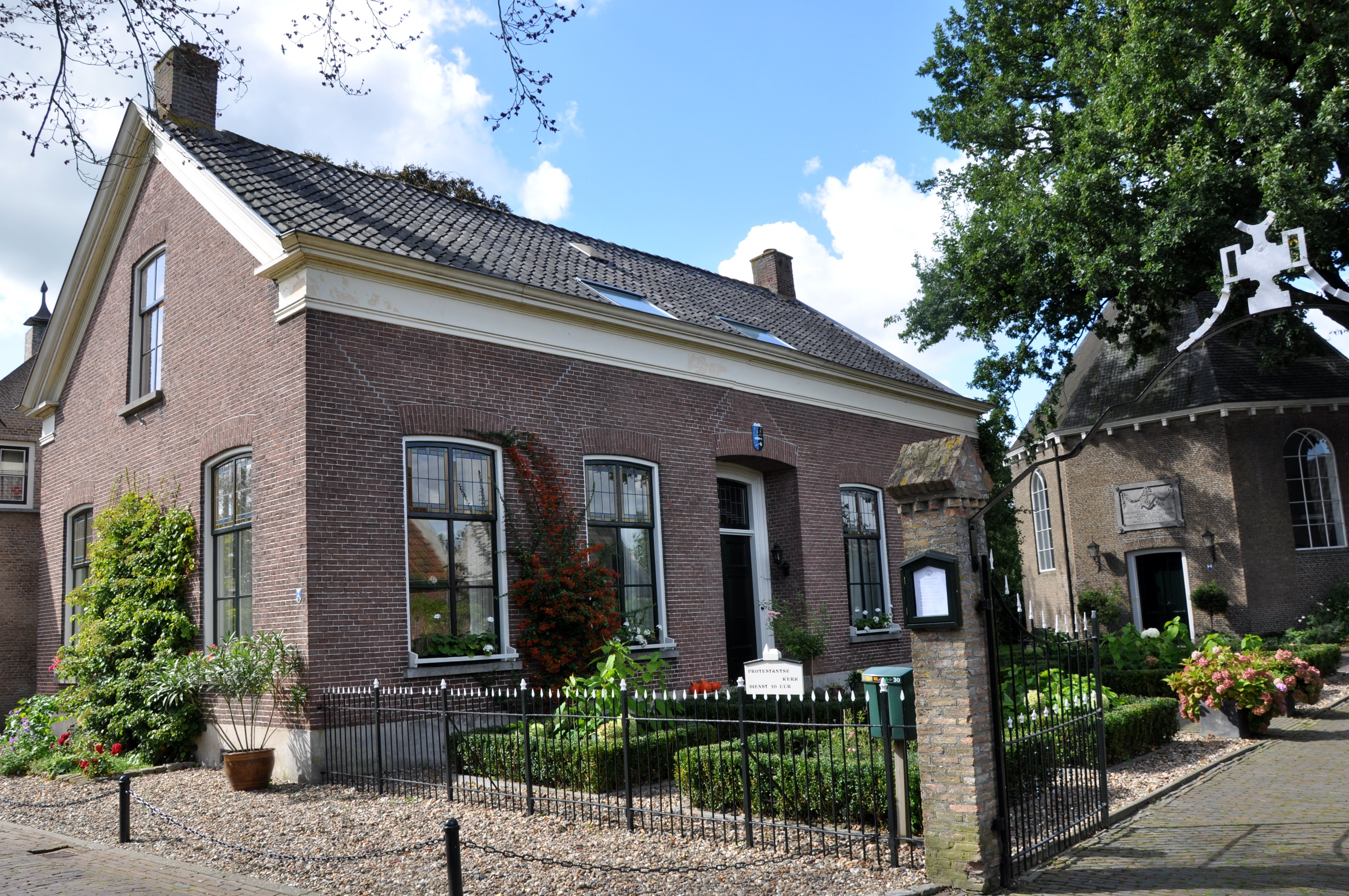
- House where the Van der Meiden family lived in Drimmelen
- Born: Theodora Hermina Coolsma; 7 November 1918; Groningen, Netherlands
- Died: 2001 (aged 82–83); Breda, Netherlands
- Occupation: author
- Writing career
- Pen name: Constance Hazelager
- Period: 1936–1980
- Genres: children's literature community correspondence

Theodora Hermina "Dora" van der Meiden-Coolsma (7 November 1918 – 19 June 2001) was a Dutch columnist and the author of children's fiction. She wrote 25 children's books. Seven of these were written together with Coos Covens. Two others were written under the pen name Constance Hazelager, under which she also wrote columns.

As the daughter, wife, and sister of Dutch Reformed ministers, and the granddaughter of the missionary Sierk Coolsma, most of her fiction was on Christian topics. Some books were set in Suriname where she had lived from 195 to 1955. From Suriname, she wrote columns for the daily newspapers Nieuwsblad van het Noorden and the Nieuwe Rotterdamsche Courant. Later, she wrote a series of articles for the Dutch women's magazine De Vrouw en haar Huis.

Dora Coolsma married ds. Jan van der Meiden on 1 July 1940. At the height of his career, he was the minister of the Grote Kerk, Dordrecht. Subsequently, the Van der Meidens lived in Boekelo and Breda. They had four children, among whom the historian and translator Pim van der Meiden (1941–2017).

== Bibliography ==
=== Books ===
- Uk's Kerstfeest (1936), writing as Dora Coolsma
- Met z'n beiden op een flatje (1947)
- Gouvernante in Egypte (1947), writing as Theodora Hermina Meiden-Coolsma
- Voortaan Marietje! (1947)
- Maar het kindje kwam (1952), writing as Dora Coolsma
- Verjarie (1955)
- Maup's grote reis (1955), writing as Theodora Hermina Meiden-Coolsma
- Kaarsen op Kerstfeest (1957)
- Kinderen van Suriname (1959), writing as Theodora Hermina Meiden-Coolsma
- Reginald (1959), writing as Theodora Hermina Meiden-Coolsma
- Als één van ons: 25 adventsverhaaltjes voor jonge kinderen (1959), with Coos Covens
- Het gebeurde in een gewone stal (1960), with Coos Covens
- De knecht van de koning (1960)
- Zeven verhalen uit de zak van Sinterklaas (1960)
- Het kindje waar de wereld op wachtte (1960), with Coos Covens
- Vier bruine beren (1961), writing as Constance Hazelager
- Jan woont in Suriname (1961)
- Zij verwachtten hem: 24 adventsverhaaltjes (1961), with Coos Covens
- De jongen, die in de tempel thuis was (1961), with Coos Covens
- Het huis aan de haven (1961), writing as Constance Hazelager
- Het hele jaar feest (1966), with Coos Covens
- Anders dan anderen: niet als andere kinderen en toch net als andere kinderen (1973)

=== Plays ===
- Wat is pasen? Eenvoudig paasspel in vier delen (1961), with Coos Covens

=== Chapters ===
- "De ster in het bos" in: Kerstboek van Zonneschijn (1948)
- "IJs op de rivier" in: Kerstboek van Zonneschijn (1949)
- "Ole Philippus" in: Kerstboek van Zonneschijn (1950)
- "Een Hollands kerstfeest" in: Het licht schijnt overal (1951)
- "Roels eerste Surinaamse Kerstfeest" in:Het licht schijnt overal (1952)
- Chapter in: Paasboeket, edited by Miep van Rooijen (1980)

=== Unpublished ===
- Brieven van J.A. van der Meiden en Dora van der Meiden-Coolsma aan Anne de Vries (1953–1955), Dutch Literature Museum
