= William Hyde (journalist) =

American newspaper editor

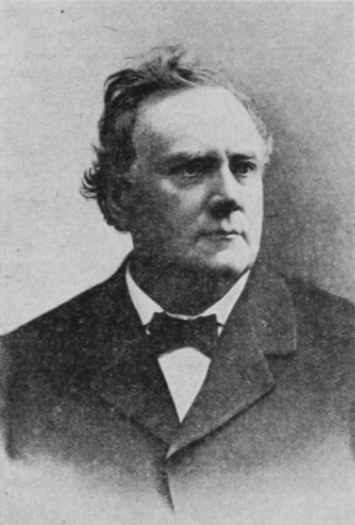
- Born: William Elisha Hyde; August 27, 1836; Lima, New York, U.S.
- Died: October 30, 1898 (aged 62); St. Louis, Missouri, U.S.
- Education: McKendree University; Transylvania University
- Occupation: Journalist

William Elisha Hyde (August 27, 1836 – October 30, 1898) was an American journalist, the managing editor of the Missouri Republican newspaper of St. Louis, Missouri, for nineteen years.

== Personal life ==
Hyde was born on August 27, 1836, in Lima, New York, the son of Elisha Hyde of Connecticut, a teacher at Genesee College, and Amanda N. Gregory, also an educator, of Ithaca, New York. He had a brother, Horace L. Hyde, a journalist.

William Hyde as a young man worked in the drug business, then became a teacher in a country district school. He attended McKendree College and then taught school. He received a legal education from Transylvania University in Lexington, Kentucky. Hyde registered for the draft in June 1865.

He was married in June 1867 to Hallie Benson of Missouri, whom one newspaper described as a "southern lady", in St. James Cathedral, Toronto, Illinois. Among those present were Jefferson Davis and Confederate General Jubal Early. The couple had two daughters, Chaille F. and Amy.

Hyde had a brother, Horace L., also a journalist, who was found dead on a railroad track near Jefferson City, Missouri, on January 23, 1879. A coroner's jury ruled accidental death.

William Hyde died in St. Louis on October 30, 1898, and was buried in Belleville, Illinois.

== Professional life ==
=== Career ===
Hyde began his newspaper career around the time of the adoption by Congress in 1854 of the Kansas-Nebraska Act, which effectively repealed the Missouri Compromise, stoking national tensions over the extension of slavery. He wrote editorials for the Belleville Tribune in defense of Stephen A. Douglas, the principal backer of the legislation, and then took a partnership in the newspaper. In 1856, he edited the Sterling (Illinois) Times and also worked actively for James Buchanan, the successful Democratic candidate for president.

He next went to Springfield, the state capital, in the hope of being elected clerk of the Illinois House of Representatives. Instead, on January 8, 1856, he became the correspondent there for the Missouri Republican while also being a committee clerk. He was said to have been the first reporter west of the Mississippi River to receive and send a news message on the wires.

In 1859, he made a trip in a balloon with three other men, from St. Louis to Jefferson County, New York, an estimated eight hundred miles, a distance flight that was not bested for half a century. The others were balloon builder John La Mountain, balloonist John Wise and Vermont businessman O.A. Gager.

Under the editorship of Nathaniel Paschall, Hyde was promoted to city editor of the Republican in 1860. He became managing editor in 1866, upon Paschall's death. He directed the editorial policy in that position for nineteen years.

Hyde was a loyal supporter of Samuel J. Tilden and played an important part in bringing the 1876 Democratic National Convention to St. Louis.

Hyde retired from the Republican in 1886 and, after a trip abroad, he was appointed by President Grover Cleveland as postmaster in St. Louis. Later, Hyde published an unsuccessful newspaper called The Ballot in St. Joseph, Missouri. He then went to Salt Lake City, where he became an editor on The Herald and helped organize the Democratic Party in Utah. He resigned, returned to St. Louis, and took a job in the post office.

He began work on an encyclopedia of the history of St. Louis, which was completed after his death by Howard L. Conard.

=== Quarrels ===
Hyde was reputed to be "a man of few words and of quick action".

He was part of a delegation which went to Washington, D.C., to unsuccessfully lobby for the Democratic National Convention to be held in St. Louis. Articles in the Post-Dispatch accused the committee members of losing the bid because they were drunk. It was said that when Hyde returned to St. Louis, "he found that the alleged disgrace attached to the asserted Washington spree had preceded him, and his blood began to boil."

One of the articles was reprinted in the Globe-Democrat, whose managing editor was Joseph B. McCullagh, and when Hyde and McCullagh met by chance at Fourth Street and Olive, a sharp-tongued quarrel ensued. The discord was ended when bystanders led the two in opposite directions.

On March 1, the Post-Dispatch printed a verse which, according to the Minneapolis Star-Tribune, gave the idea "that Mr. Hyde had been mistaken by Washington people for a walking whisky-still." Hyde threatened to thrash the "gentleman from Austria" (Joseph Pulitzer, publisher of the Post-Dispatch) "within an inch of his life".

In the evening, Hyde encountered Pulitzer on Olive Street near Fourth; Hyde called him "a damned Austrian Jew" and struck him full in the face. The "stunning blow" knocked off Pulitzer's eyeglasses and scattered his papers. One witness said that Pulitzer drew a revolver, but it fell to the ground. The two grappled, and Pulitzer was struck again in the face; he fell to the sidewalk with Hyde on top of him, then they grappled in a gutter "full of mud and slush." Bystanders stopped the combat, and Hyde walked away. Pulitzer was helped into a barber shop and rubbed down.

=== Building fire ===
Hyde narrowly escaped injury during a fire on May 24, 1870, which destroyed the Republican building on Chestnut Street. The St. Louis Globe-Democrat reported that Hyde "had a valuable private library in his room, [and] rushed up to save some of the books" by throwing a dozen of them out a window before his retreat was cut off and he "incontinently plunged through the fire", escaping with a few minor bruises.

== Legacy ==
In August 1918, the name of the Bremen branch post office at 2510 North Broadway in St. Louis was changed to the Hyde Station in his honor, as part of a move to eliminate "Teutonic names" from post office branches.

== See also ==
- Daniel M. Grissom (1829-1930), reporter who worked under Hyde
- Joseph A. Dacus (1838-1885), writer who cared for Hyde's brother, Horace (Holly), during a suicide attempt
