= Joseph A. Dacus =

American writer and journalist

Joseph A. Dacus (1838–1885) was an American writer and journalist who wrote a history of outlaws Frank and Jesse James and a survey of the 1877 St. Louis general strike. He was also a member of the Missouri State Legislature.

== Professional life ==
His first work was as an editor in Memphis, Tennessee, and after the Civil War, he moved to St. Louis, Missouri. He went to work for the Missouri Republican, where he was the "river editor." He was also with the Times, the Dispatch, and the Journal there.

In 1868, the Public Ledger of Memphis reported that Dacus was then a "Baptist preacher in Illinois," adding that "Within the brief space of five years he has been a grocer, cotton factor, farmer, school teacher, journalist, poet, political 'stump orator', book agent, chief engineer of a flatboat and superintendent of a saw mill."

He wrote popular novels, including Idle Wild, and then the successful non-fiction Life of the James Boys and Annals of the Great Strike. He also wrote "a volume of facts and figures" about the Temperance movement called Battling With the Demon. His other works included Guide to Success, Golden Glimmer, Life in the Western Wilds, The Last Christmas Eve at Pleurs and poems, critical essays, statistical works, and serial stories. He wrote for the Chicago Current and Eastern magazines.

Dacus teamed up with James W. Buel to write A Tour of St. Louis, or the Inside Life of a Great City, published in 1878.

His book on the James brothers was merchandised by subscription and was said to have sold 21,000 copies in four months' time.

Dacus served in the Missouri Legislature as a Democrat, and in 1875 he was one of the incorporators of the Valley Monthly Publishing Company in St. Louis.

== Personal life ==
Dacus was born in 1838 in West Tennessee. The 1850 census listed him at age 11 as living in Tipton, Tennessee, District 7, with other Dacus family members, Lewis, 63; Nancy, 47; Buford L., 20; Mary B. 19; Nancy E., 15; Daniel D., 13; Emily, 10, and Frances, 8.

The 1860 census listed him at age 22 living with Nancy Dacus (female), age 58, a farmer; E. Ducas (female), 20, and T.M. Dacus (female), 15.

Dacus suffered from a severe case of "confluent smallpox" with resulting lesions. He was said to be "homely," but "Beauty beamed at him from the street corners, and sweet smiles were showered on him from every doorway and window ... soon after leaving Memphis, he wedded one of the loveliest daughters of a neighboring State."

He and Elizabeth C. Upchurch were married in Tipton under a license issued July 26, 1866.

In 1870, Dacus, a 29-year-old editor, was living with Elizabeth Dacos, 28, and a baby, Lulu. His child died at the age of 3 in March 1872.

According to an 1877 article in the Kansas City Times, datelined Jefferson City, Dacus was

a man of nerve, as was demonstrated in an affair of honor that occurred in Tennessee some years ago, in which he saw his antagonist carried off the field seriously wounded ... While representing the Republican here he at one time had a personal difficulty with Col. George Vest, in which blows were interchanged.

In 1877, Horace (Holly) Hyde, a reporter on the Republican who had just quit his job, was an overnight guest of Dacus in his rooms in a Jefferson City house owned by former Mayor Fred Fisher, when, late at night, Hyde attempted suicide by slitting his throat. Hyde said he wanted to end his life because he had been diagnosed with heart disease. Dacus and others attended Hyde through the night and watched over him. A brother of William Hyde (journalist), Horace Hyde was found dead on a railroad track near Jefferson City two years later. A coroner's jury ruled accidental death.

Dacus moved to Watalula Springs, Arkansas, in 1881, and died there. He was buried in Mountain View Cemetery in Franklin County.

=== Relation to Mexico ===
During the American Civil War, Dacus went to San Luis Potosí, Mexico, where, under the name Jose Adison Da Cus, he bought "mountains" filled with gold, according to Judge J. O. Pierce of Memphis. Conflicting land claims followed.

In April 1878, Dacus spoke at a meeting of the St. Louis Academy of Sciences and presented drawings of the ruins of a "vast palace" at Xayi, Chiapas, Mexico.
