= Missouri Republican =

Newspaper

Missouri Republican / St. Louis Republic
- Founded: 1808; 218 years ago
- Ceased publication: 1919
- City: St. Louis, Missouri
- Country: United States

The Missouri Republican was a newspaper founded in 1808 and headquartered in St. Louis, Missouri. Its predecessor was the Morning Gazette. It later changed its name to St. Louis Republic.

After supporting the Whig Party, the paper became aligned with the Democratic Party.

In the late 19th century, the Republic had the second-largest circulation in St. Louis, surpassing papers that would survive it, such as the St. Louis Post-Dispatch and the St. Louis Star-Times. Its final owner was David R. Francis, a prominent political figure. In 1919, after years of losses, Francis sold the Republic to the St. Louis Globe-Democrat, a longtime rival paper supportive of the Republican Party, which closed it.

== History ==
The Republican was founded by Joseph Charless in 1808 as the Missouri Gazette and Louisiana Advertiser, using the first printing press to be set up west of the Mississippi River. The name was changed to Louisiana Gazette in 1809. It was changed back to Missouri Gazette in 1818 after a change in owners.

Charless's prospectus for the weekly newspaper said, in part:

. . . we conceive it unnecessary to offer anything like professions to the public, but rather let the columns of the GAZETTE speak for themselves, and the print live or die by the character it may acquire, but its intended Patrons have a right to be acquainted with the grounds upon which their approbation is solicited.

Three columns of the paper were to be reserved for news in French, as many of the residents of the city were ethnic French who spoke that language.

The printing press came from Philadelphia, and the type from Louisville, Kentucky. The only paper available in St. Louis measured 8x12 inches, so that was the size used for the first issue, on July 12, 1808. There were 170 subscribers.

The first printer to work in the West was a Mr. Hinkle, who set up the first form of the Gazette in a little one-story building on Main Street . . . . the inking of the forms, as well as operating the press, was a task to be performed by hand. The old Ramage press . . . served to supply the public with their newspaper until 1827.

The Gazette hired Henry Marie Brackenridge, son of Hugh Henry Brackenridge and his wife, as the first staff correspondent for a St. Louis newspaper. His father was an attorney, chaplain, editor and more, based in Pittsburgh, Pennsylvania. The younger Brackenridge was educated in part by living for several years with a French-speaking family in Ste. Genevieve, Missouri when young, and then on another occasion. After reading the law and passing the bar in Baltimore, Maryland, Brackenridge had practiced there and in Pennsylvania, but grew restless and returned to the West in 1810, settling in St. Louis.

In the winter of 1810–1811, he wrote a series of articles for the Gazette about the Louisiana Territory. In 1811 he traveled with Manuel Lisa to the upper Missouri for fur trading. Brackenridge wrote "descriptive letters" for the Gazette from locations along the Missouri River during these months.

In 1820, Charless sold the Gazette, with its one thousand subscribers, to James C. Cummins, who had recently arrived from Pittsburgh. The latter held the paper for 18 months; in 1822 he sold it to Edward Charless, the oldest son of the founder. Edward Charless changed its name to Missouri Republican. Joseph (or Josiah) Spalding of Connecticut was made editor and partner.

Nathaniel Paschall became an apprentice printer in 1813 and became associated with Charless in March 1818. He eventually became the editor. George Knapp was another important figure in Republican history who began as an apprentice, in 1827.

The Republican became a daily newspaper on September 20, 1836.

In July 1837, Charless and Paschall sold the concern to A.B. Chambers, Oliver Harris, and George Knapp. Harris withdrew in August 1839, and the paper continued under Chambers and Knapp. In January 1840 Joseph W. Dougherty became a proprietor, but he left after a brief time. Chambers died on May 22, 1854, and George Knapp became sole owner a year later.

In August 1854, Nathaniel Paschall and John Knapp were admitted as partners. Paschall died in 1866, and William Hyde, who had been hired as a reporter in 1857, was promoted to editor.

It eventually becoming known as the St. Louis Republic in 1888. After supporting the Whig Party, the paper became aligned with the Democratic Party. In the late 19th century, the Republic had the second largest circulation in St. Louis, surpassing papers that would survive it, such as the St. Louis Post-Dispatch and the St. Louis Star-Times. Its final owner was David R. Francis, a prominent political figure. In 1919, after years of losses, Francis sold the Republic to the St. Louis Globe-Democrat, a longtime rival paper supportive of the Republican Party, which closed it.

== Symbol ==
The symbol of the newspaper was a figure of a "coon couchant," always mentioned in heraldic terms, or a raccoon that was posed lying down.

In 1840, the newspaper had supported William Henry Harrison as the presidential candidate.

with such effectiveness and zeal that in the midst of that . . . campaign[,] an emblem, a symbol as it were, was bestowed upon the paper by the admiring Whigs. The Republican was called "the Old Coon." The name was accepted promptly. The emblem, a metallic figure of a coon couchant, was hoisted high over the building . . . Perched over the smoke stack[,] the coon was visible from all parts of the city. . . . The emblem survived two disastrous fires. When the paper was moved to Third and Chestnut streets, occupying a new building which ranked with the imposing architecture of the city in its day, the coon found a place in the iron arch of the main entrance. The figure was also carried above the building.

When the building was torn down in 1932, the doorway symbol was presented to the St. Louis Globe-Democrat, the successor to the Republican.

== Politics ==
In 1856, the Republican supported James Buchanan for President of the United States. It was Democratic in politics, but vigorously opposed to secession. After the election of Abraham Lincoln, it did not support his administration in many measures.

Under Andrew Johnson, the Republican advocated a "passive policy" or "possum policy" for Democrats, with the support of Carl Schurz and his Westliche Post among the many German immigrants and their descendants. In practice, the publishers of the two newspapers conducted a national convention of Liberal Republicans which met in Cincinnati, Ohio, and nominated Horace Greeley and Benjamin Gratz Brown.

The Republican was instrumental in establishing a state lottery in 1871. It succeeded in bringing the 1876 Democratic National Convention to St. Louis.

In 1873, it propounded its political stand as

a fearless and independent advocate of Liberal Democratic principles. It is bound, however, by no ties to the support of unworthy men, nor by party discipline to any action it may deem unwise of impolitic. . . . It will studiously strive, as in the past, to avoid sensational and prurient journalism, and will without sacrificing spice and piquancy, aim to make itself worthy of admission into the purest circles. . . . It will also be enlivened with a variety of miscellaneous matter, and by features of interest to be found only in this paper.

== Circulation ==
In January 1876, the newspaper had a circulation of more than 240,000.

== First fire and second building ==
The first Republican building, including all the books and files, was destroyed by fire on May 17, 1849.

The firm moved into a new, five-story building, plus basement, which had just been completed. The basement held all the printing paper, and two news presses, one an eight-cylinder and the other a four-cylinder. There were two engines and two boilers as well.

The first floor held the counting room, two large fireproof vaults, file and paper cases, and back copies of the Republican and Democrat; second floor, a job bindery and the office of the job department; third floor, editorial rooms and the job printing office; fourth, more of the job office, material and machinery; and top floor, the news department, typesetting and makeup quarters, where some thirty-five printers, or "typos," could work. The job department included the office and back shop of the Irish News, which appealed to the many ethnic Irish in the city.

== Second fire and third building ==
On the evening of May 24, 1870, the five-story Republican building, on Chestnut Street between Second and Main streets, was destroyed by fire. The supply of water was insufficient to throw water any higher than the second story of the four-floor building until mud was forced out of the pipes.

Managing Editor William Hyde rushed to his room to save the valuable books in his library. He was accompanied by a self-possessed compositor named Fisk, who began to assist him in throwing books out at the windows. They had not thrown out more than a dozen . . . before their retreat was wholly cut off. . . .

Most of the books were destroyed, including several rare and valuable volumes. Crowds of spectators witnessed the debacle, emptying theaters to rush to see the intense flames engorge the building, which eventually collapsed. A four-cylinder Hoe press was saved, being protected in a fireproof vault. Only one day of publication was missed. A temporary building was constructed on the same site.

A five-story Renaissance style replacement building was opened on Wednesday, January 8, 1873, on Third Street at Chestnut.

== Page size ==
In its later days, the Republican had the largest page size of any newspaper west of the Mississippi. The years and page sizes were: 1822, 20x22 inches; 1828, 22x32 inches; 1835, 24x34 inches; 1843, 27x46 inches; 1844, 28x48 inches; 1851, 31.5x52 inches; 1853, 33x56 inches.

== Archiving ==
The St. Louis Republic is archived at the St. Louis Public Library and is part of the Library of Congress's Chronicling America collection.

== Notable people ==
- George Brown, "the highest-salaried newspaper reporter in St. Louis about 1875."
- William Hyde, managing editor
- William Marion Reedy, whose "daily assignment was the school board offices in the old Polytechnic building at Seventh and Locust streets." He became a "writer of more than local fame."
