= Merchants Exchange Building (St. Louis) =

Building in Missouri, US (1875–1958)

Coordinates: 38.62612°N 90.187379°W

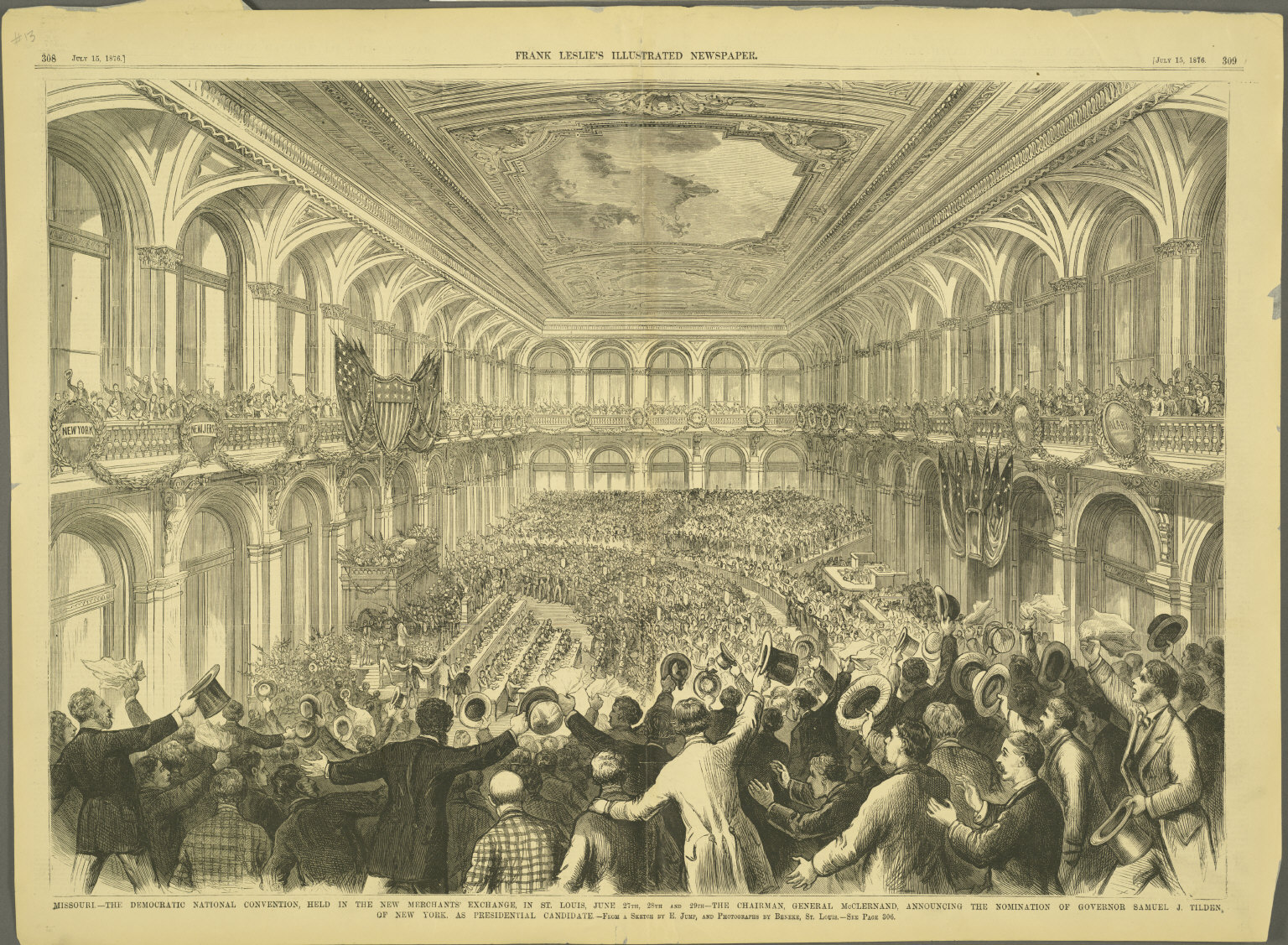
Interior of the Merchants Exchange Building during the 1876 Democratic National Convention, in which Samuel J. Tilden was named the party's nominee for president

The Merchants Exchange Building was a building at Third Street at Chestnut and Pine in St. Louis, Missouri, from 1875 to 1958, that housed the St. Louis Merchants Exchange and hosted the 1876 Democratic National Convention.

== Design and demolition ==
The building was designed by Francis Lee and Thomas Annan, who placed second in a competition for the structure (the winner was George I. Barnett, but his work was considered too expensive).

The building was the second Merchants Exchange on the location. The first building was built in 1857. During the American Civil War, members of the exchange split along North-South lines. The Exchange merged back together after the war.

The $2 million venue measured 235 by 187 ft (72 by 57 m) by 187 feet (57 m) and was actually two separate buildings. The second and third floors of the western half of the building had an iron truss system that supported the roof and created the largest open indoor space in the United States at the time of its construction (235 feet long and 98 feet (30 m) wide and 65 feet (20 m) tall), and thus was chosen for the 1876 Democratic National Convention, which was the first Democratic or Republican national convention held west of the Mississippi River.

At the same time of its construction, the Merchants Exchange also built the Eads Bridge across the Mississippi River.

The building was torn down in 1957 to make way for the Gateway Arch. Part of the Adam's Mark Hotel was built in its location. In 2008, the Adams Mark announced plans to become a Grand Hyatt.

== Merchants' Exchange of St. Louis ==
The Merchants Exchange founded in 1836 was the first commodity trading exchange in the United States—predating the Chicago Board of Trade.

It was the successor of the city's Chamber of Commerce and articles about the 1876 Convention referred to it as the Chamber of Commerce.

After vacating its downtown location, it was evicted in 1995 from its new location, under the doctrine of eminent domain, when the city expanded the St. Louis Science Center.

The Exchange made a last gasp in 2001 to conduct computerized trading of future trading of freight on the Mississippi and Illinois Rivers. It has quietly ceased operation.
