= 1876 Democratic National Convention =

U.S. political event held in St. Louis, Missouri

- 1876 presidential election
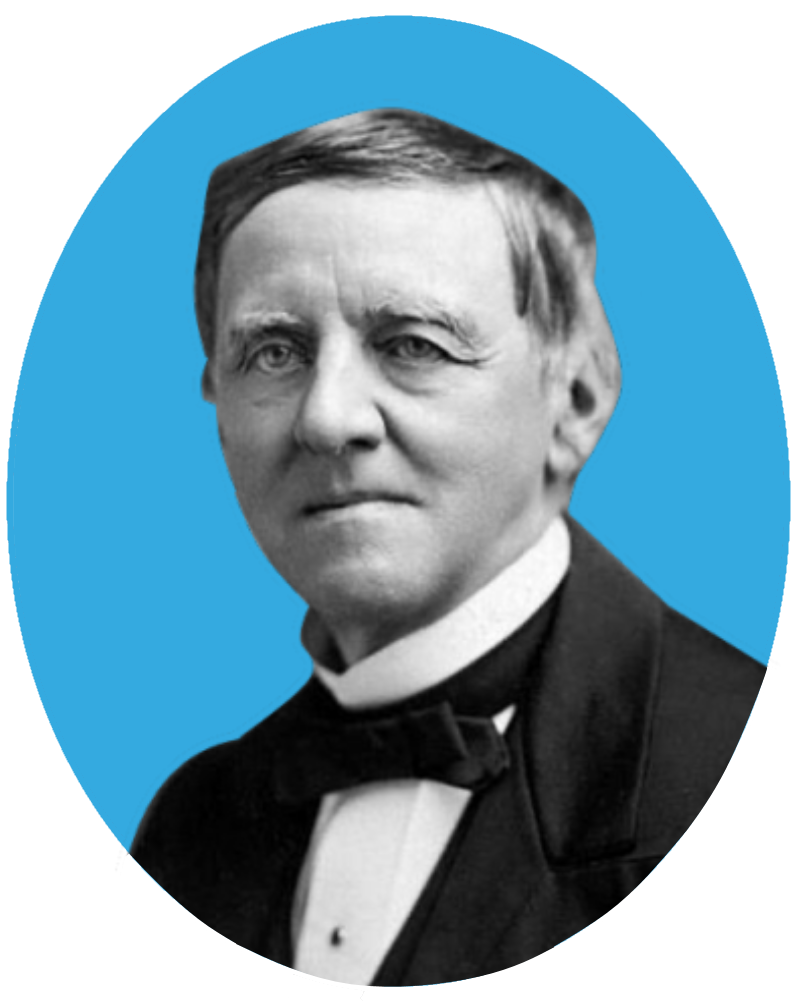
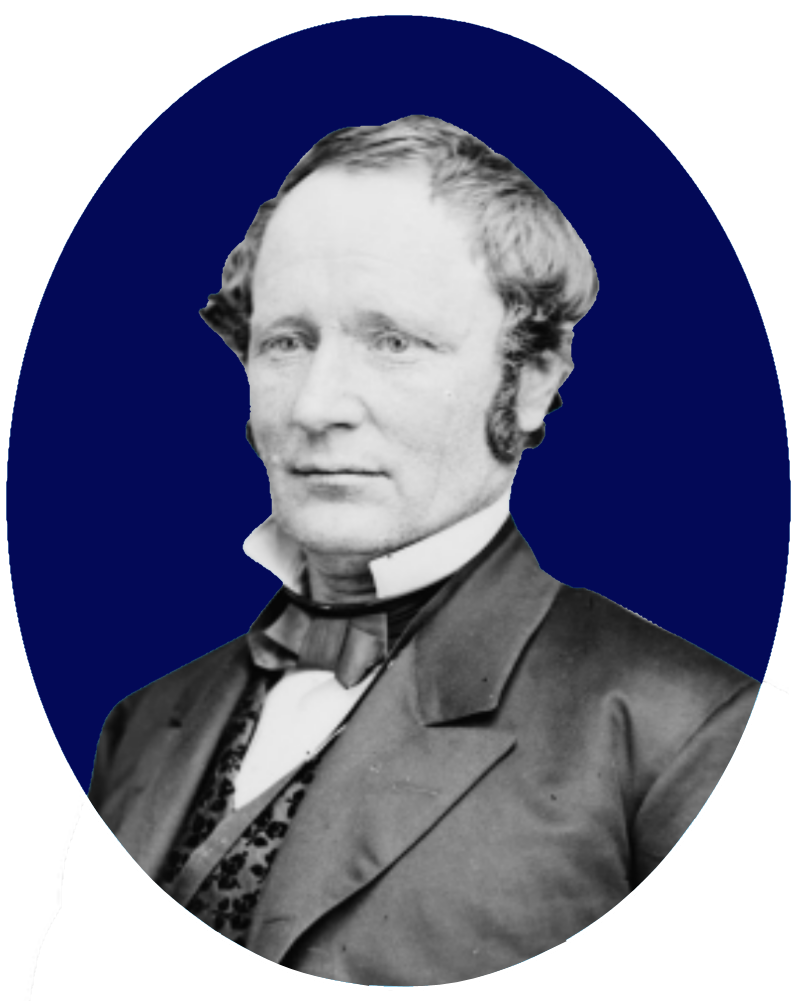
- Nominees; Tilden and Hendricks

Convention
- Date(s): June 27–29, 1876
- City: St. Louis, Missouri
- Venue: Merchants Exchange Building

Candidates
- Presidential nominee: Samuel Tilden of New York
- Vice-presidential nominee: Thomas Hendricks of Indiana

The 1876 Democratic National Convention assembled in St. Louis just nine days after the conclusion of the Republican National Convention in Cincinnati.

This was the first political convention held west of the Mississippi River. St. Louis was notified in February 1876 that it had been selected. Among the events was a fireworks display from the top of the Old Courthouse.

== Proceedings ==
The convention was called to order by Democratic National Committee chairman Augustus Schell. Henry Watterson served as the temporary convention chairman and John Alexander McClernand, a retired congressman and major general, served as permanent convention president.

== Platform ==
The Democratic platform pledged to replace the corruption of the Grant administration with honest, efficient government and to end "the rapacity of carpetbag tyrannies" in the South; called for treaty protection for naturalized U.S. citizens visiting their homeland, restrictions on Oriental immigration, and tariff reform; and opposed land grants to railroads.

== Presidential nomination ==
=== Presidential candidates ===
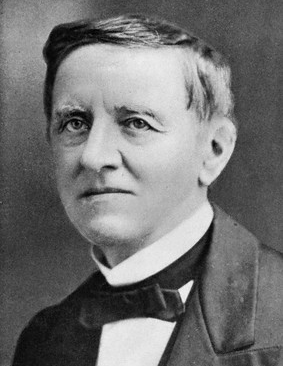
Governor Samuel J. Tilden of New York

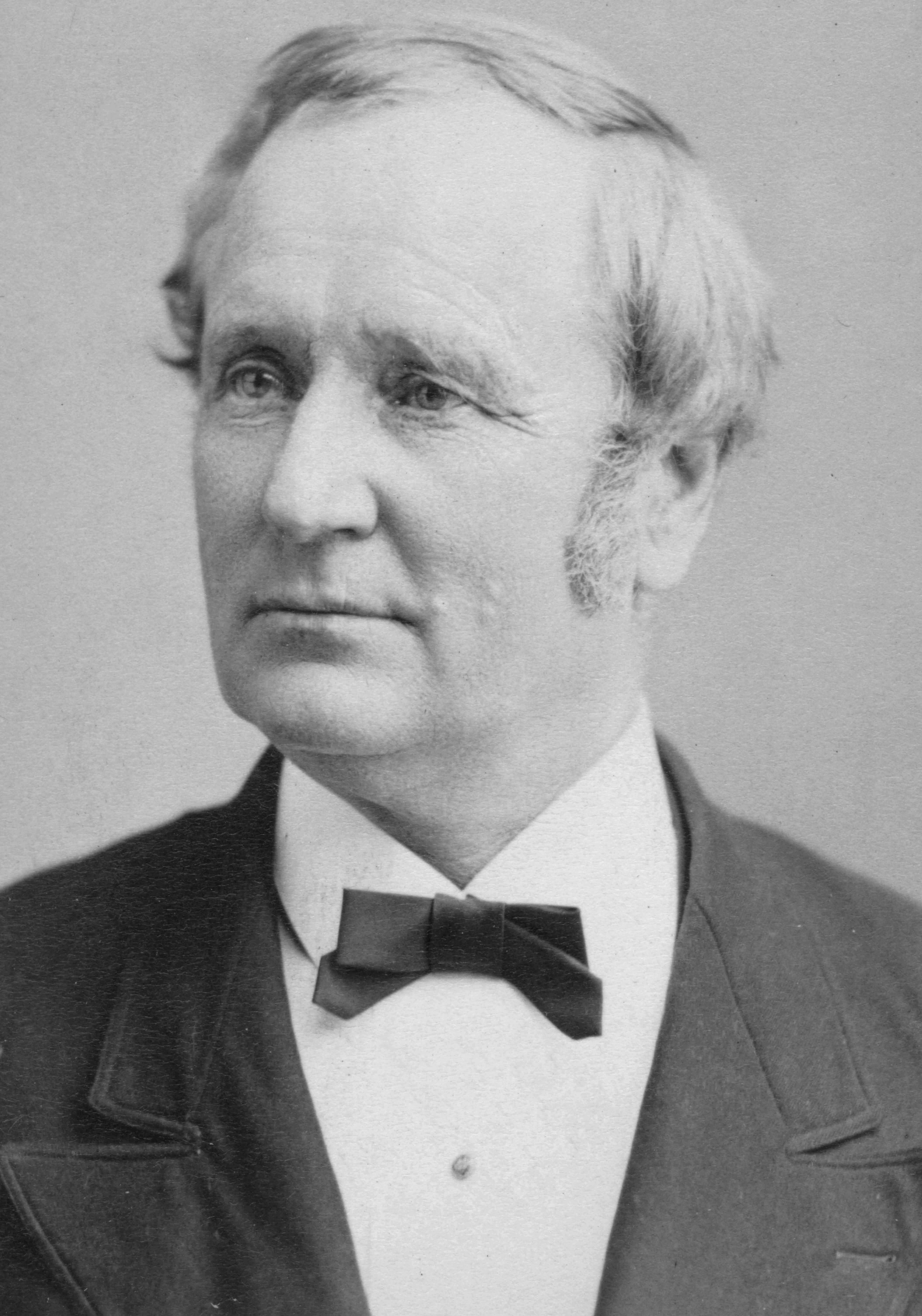
Governor Thomas A. Hendricks of Indiana

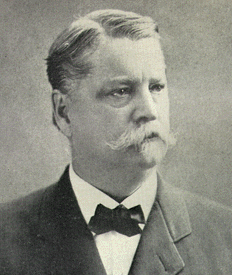
Major General Winfield Scott Hancock of Pennsylvania

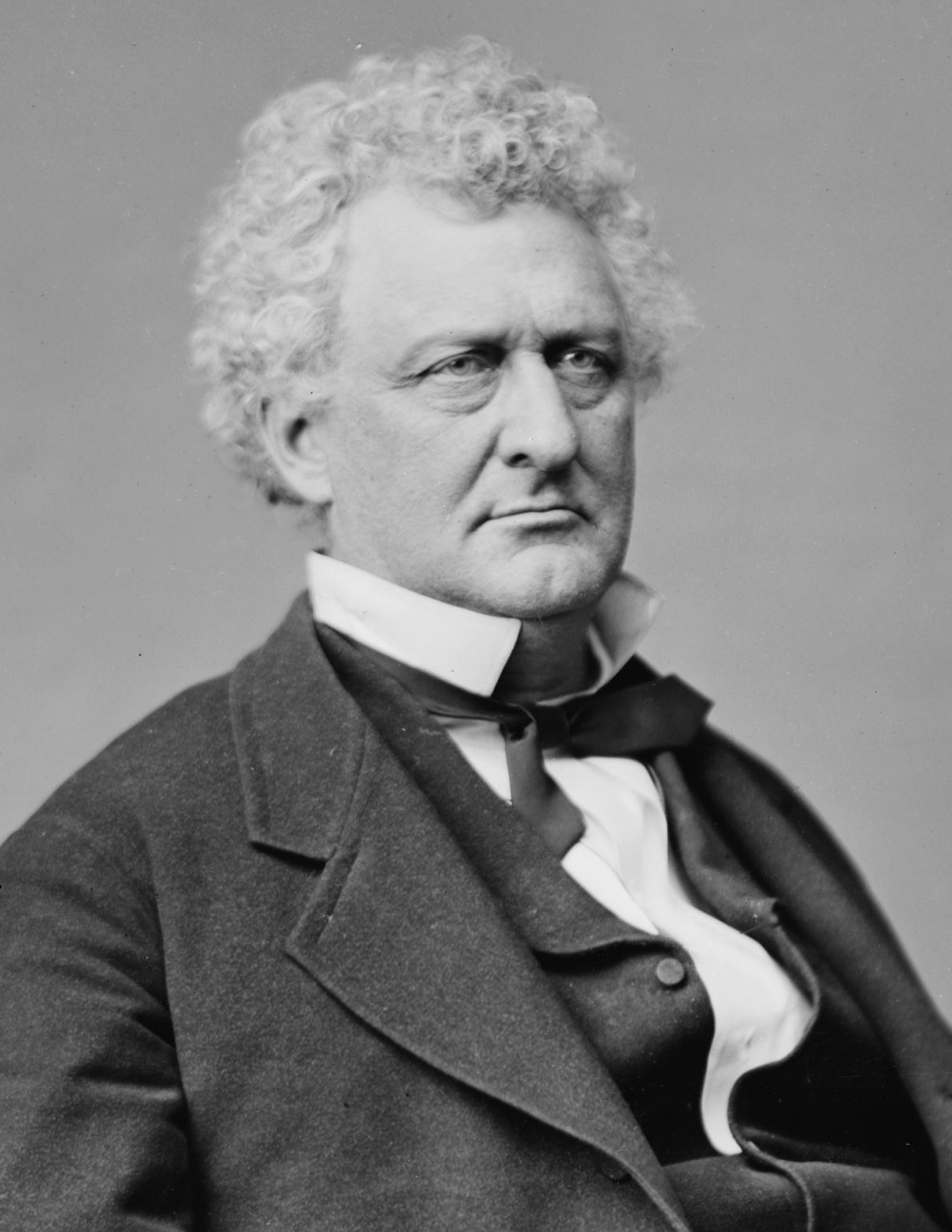
Former Governor William Allen of Ohio

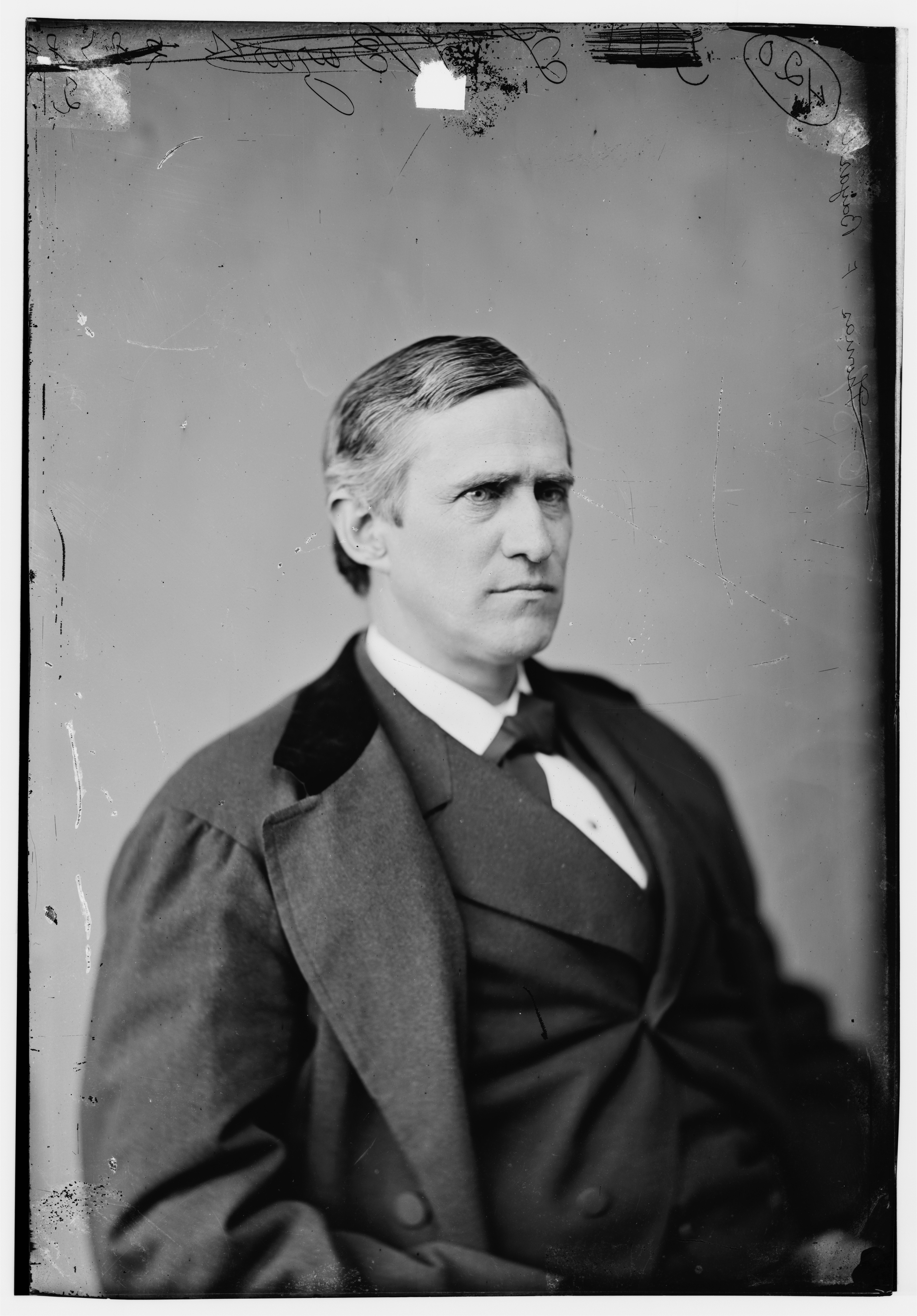
Senator Thomas F. Bayard of Delaware

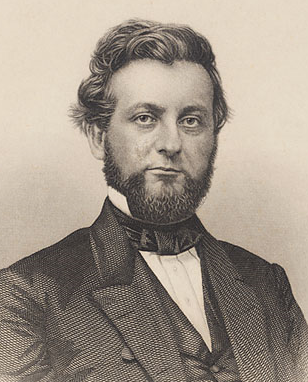
Former Governor Joel Parker of New Jersey

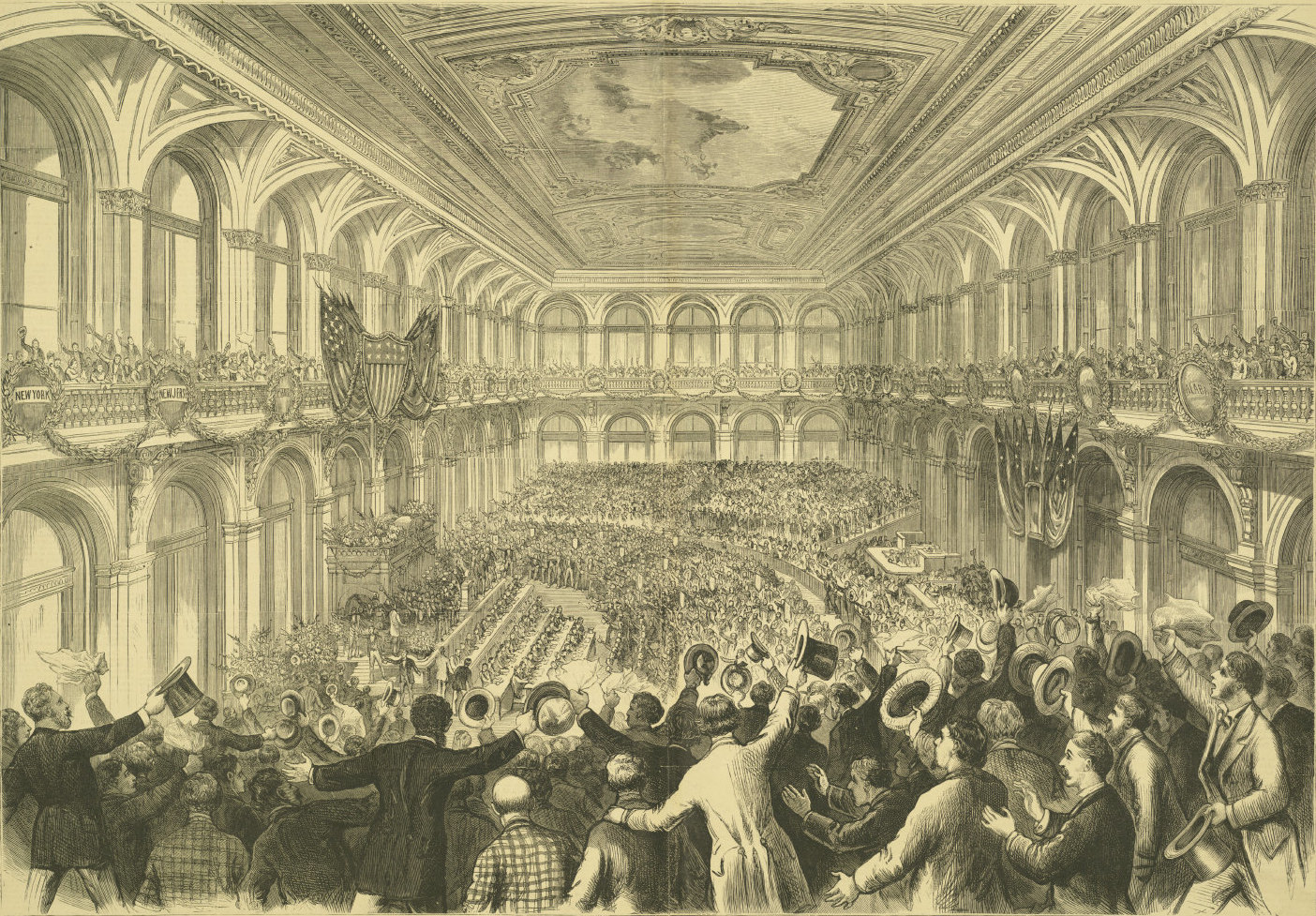
Interior of the Merchants Exchange Building of St. Louis, Missouri, during the announcement of Samuel J. Tilden as the Democratic presidential nominee

The 12th Democratic National Convention assembled in St. Louis in June 1876. Five thousand people jammed the auditorium in St. Louis, hoping for the Democrats' first presidential victory in 20 years. The platform called for immediate and sweeping reforms following the scandal-plagued Grant administration.

Six names were placed in nomination: Samuel J. Tilden, Thomas A. Hendricks, Winfield Scott Hancock, William Allen, Thomas F. Bayard, and Joel Parker. Tilden won more than 400 votes on the first ballot, a strong showing, but less than the 492 required by the convention's two-thirds rule. He won the nomination by a landslide on the second ballot. Although Tilden was strongly opposed by "Honest John" Kelly, the leader of New York's Tammany Hall, he was still able to obtain the nomination. According to contemporary accounts, Tilden's nomination was received by the delegates with more enthusiasm than that of any nominee since Andrew Jackson.

Presidential Ballot
	1st (Before Shifts)	1st (After Shifts)	2nd (Before Shifts)	2nd (After Shifts)	Unanimous
Tilden	403.5	410.5	508	534	738
Hendricks	133.5	140.5	85	60	0
Hancock	77	77	60	59	0
Allen	56	56	54	54	0
Bayard	31	31	11	11	0
Broadhead	19	5	0	0	0
Parker	18	18	18	18	0
Thurman	0	0	2	2	0

Source: Official proceedings of the National Democratic convention, held in St. Louis, Mo., June 27th, 28th and 29th, 1876. (September 3, 2012).

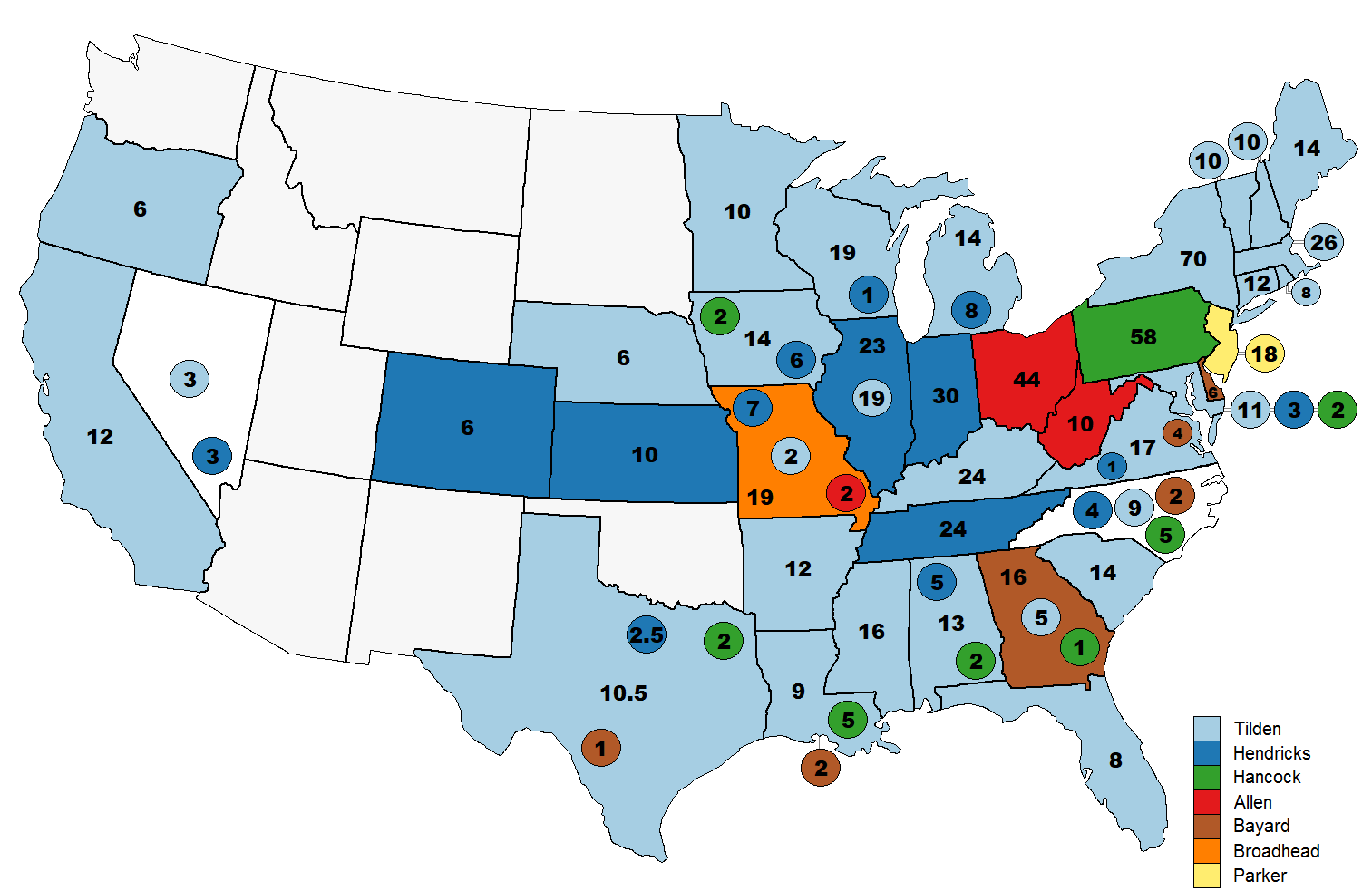
1st Presidential Ballot
Before Shifts

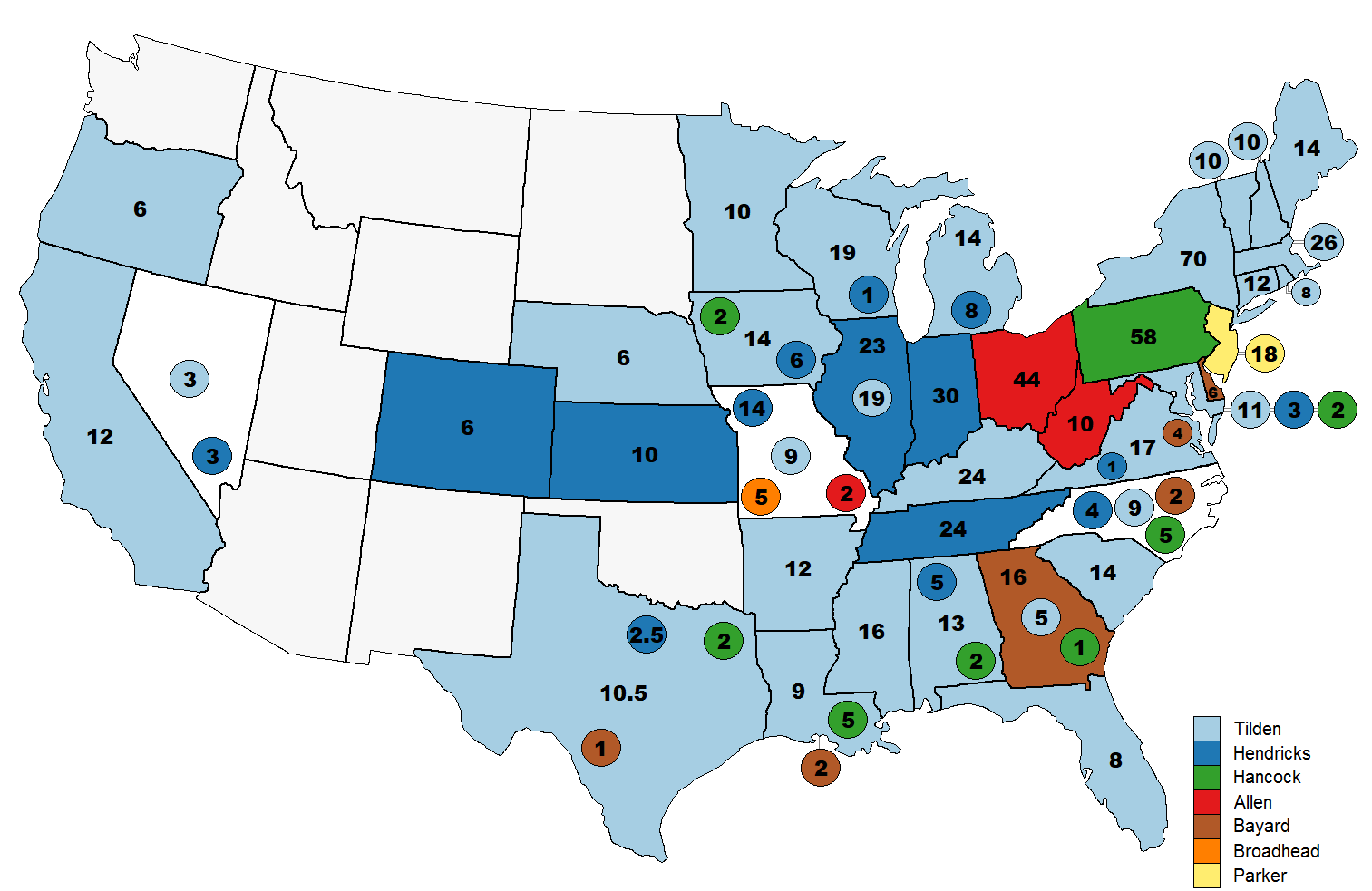
1st Presidential Ballot
After Shifts

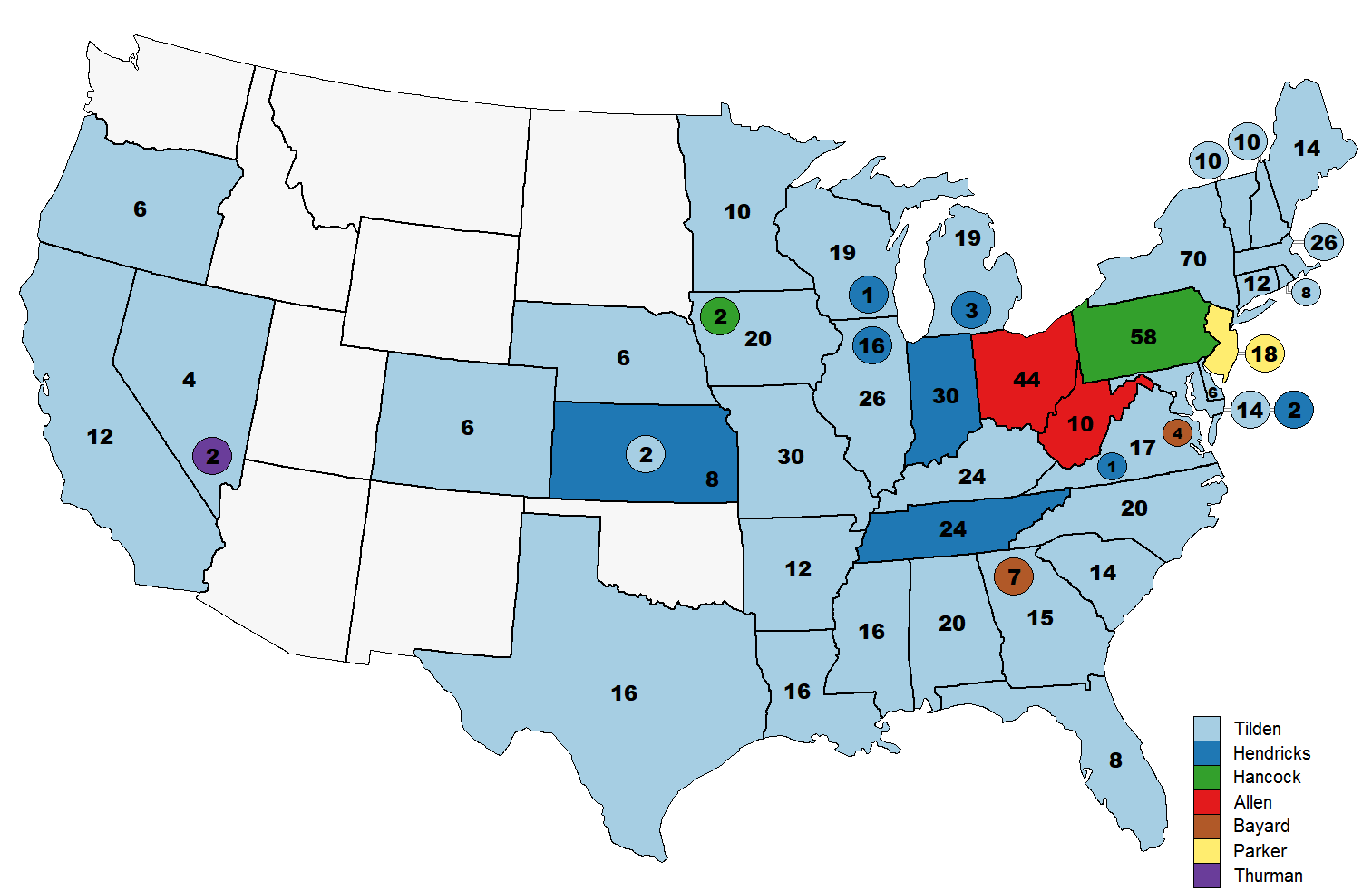
2nd Presidential Ballot
Before Shifts

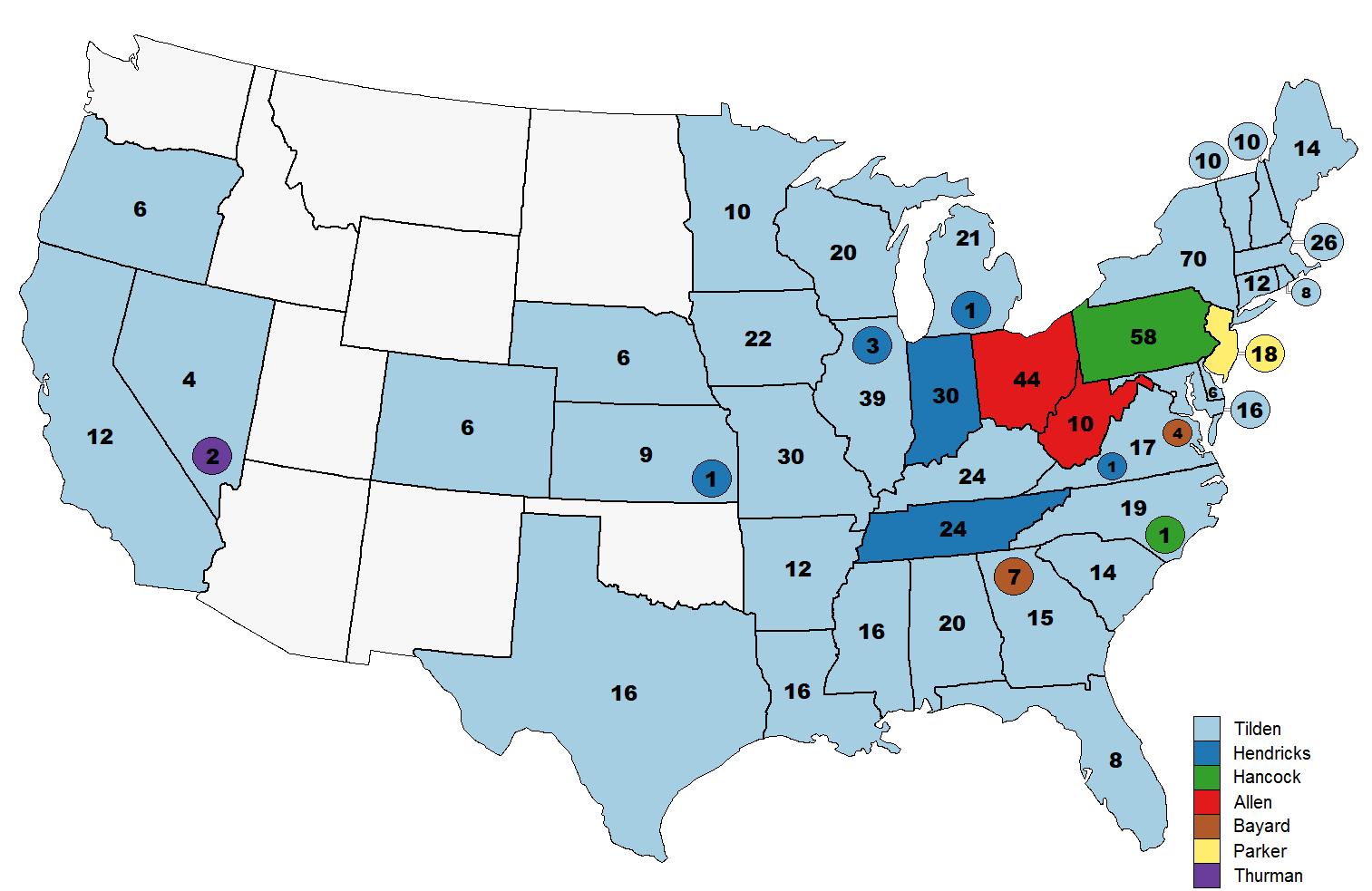
2nd Presidential Ballot
After Shifts

== Vice presidential nomination ==
=== Vice presidential candidates ===
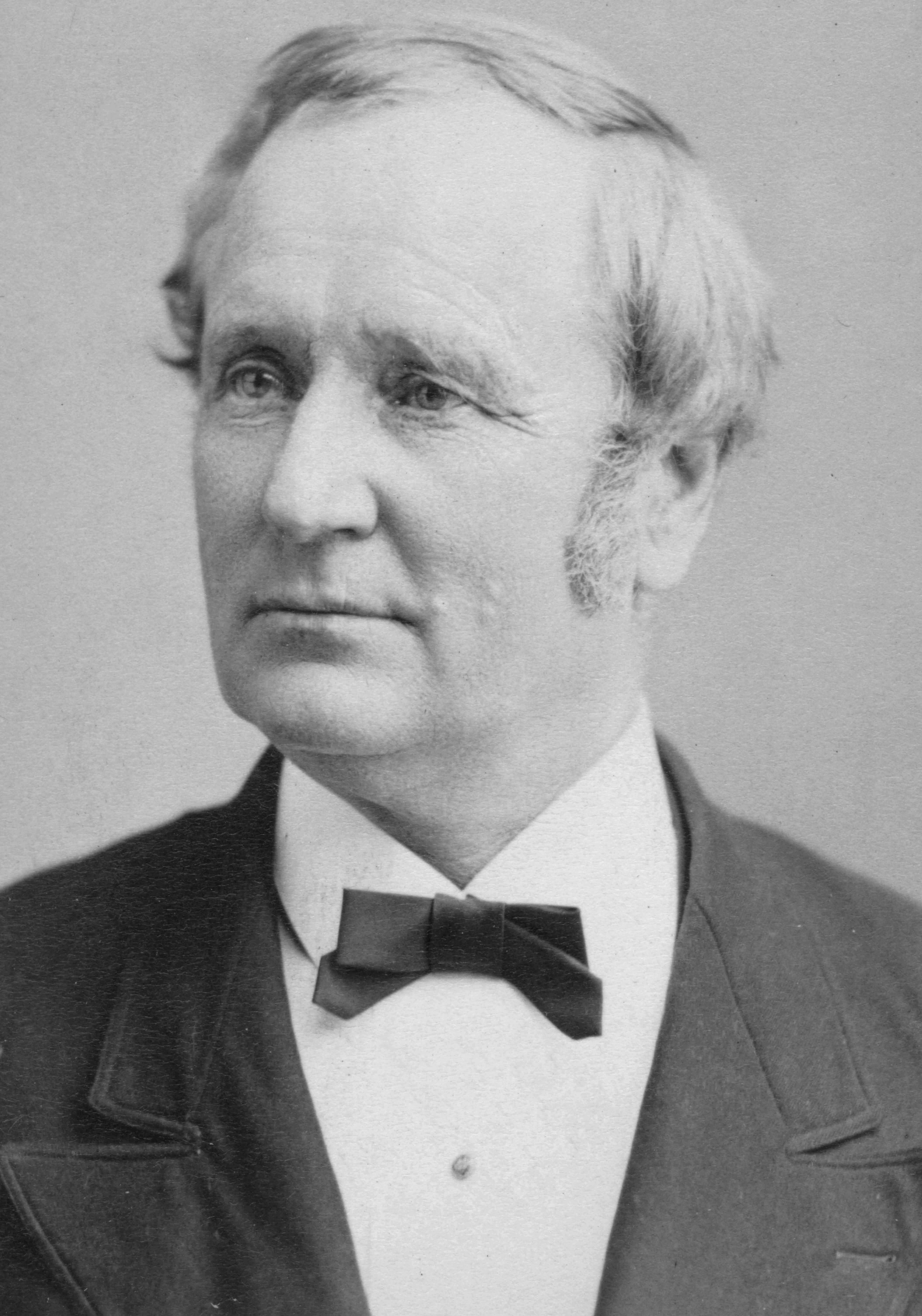
Governor
Thomas A. Hendricks
of Indiana

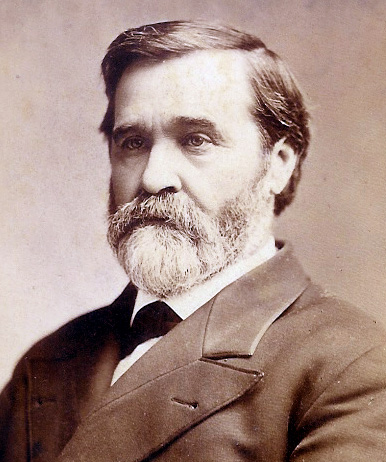
Representative
William R. Morrison
of Illinois
(Not Nominated)

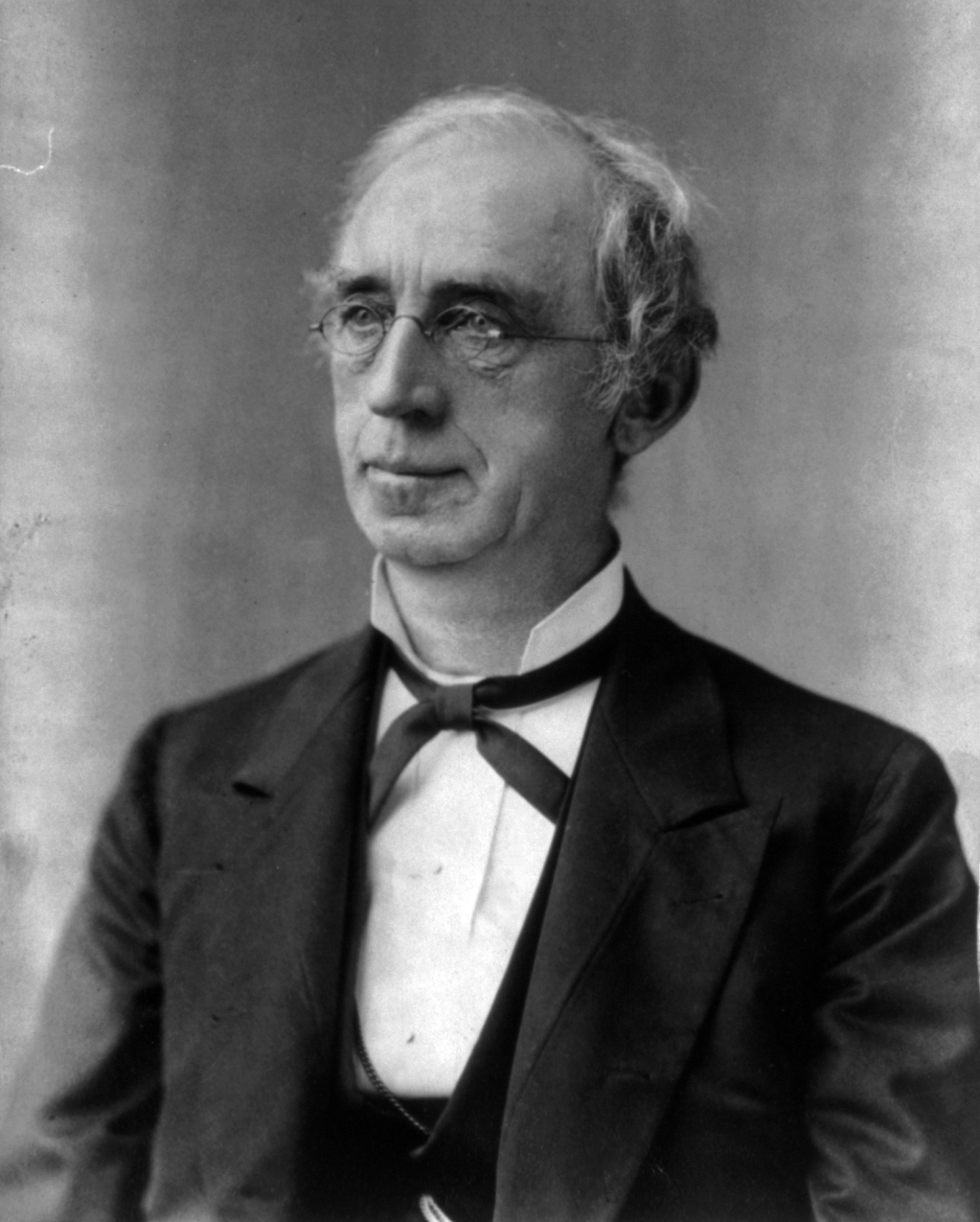
Representative
Henry B. Payne
of Ohio
(Not Nominated)

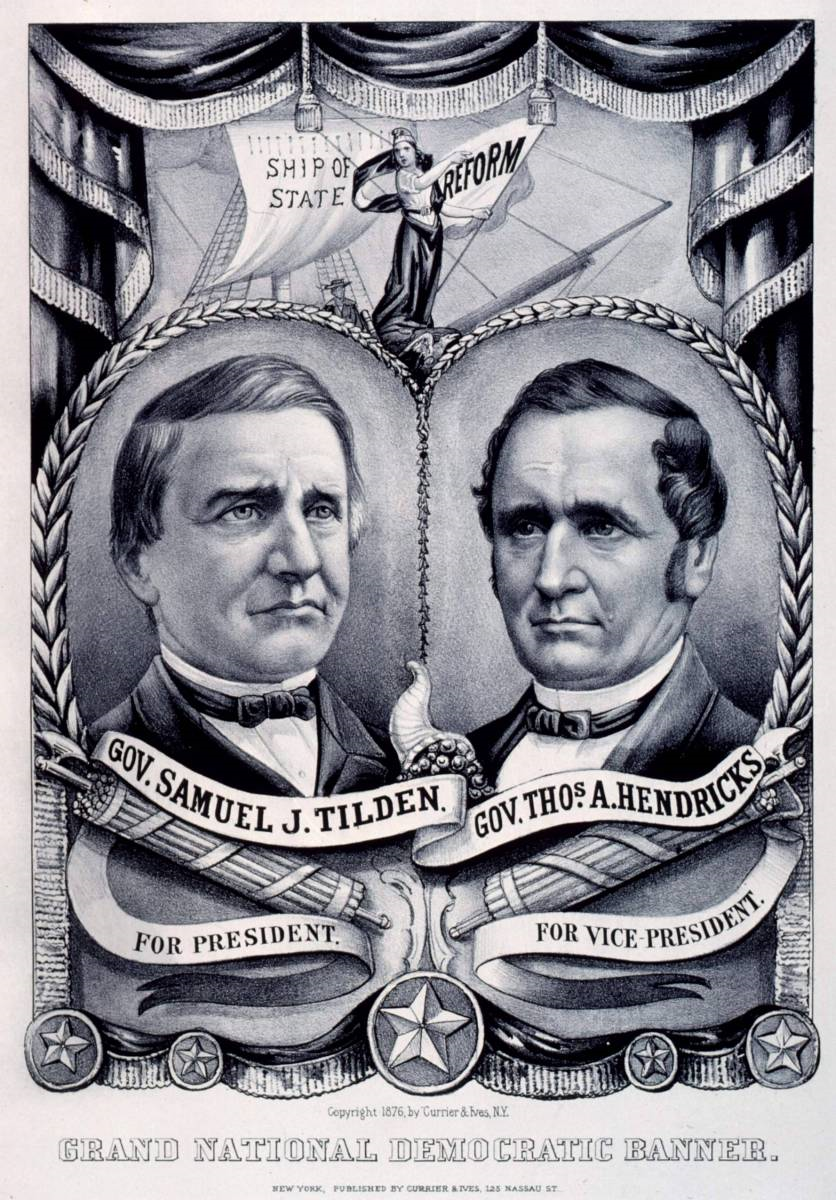
Tilden/Hendricks campaign poster

Delegates proposed various potential candidates for vice president, including William R. Morrison of Illinois, chairman of the House Committee on Ways and Means. The Ohio delegation considered nominating U.S. Representative Henry B. Payne. However, the feeling of unanimity was so great that the Ohio delegates instead seconded the nomination of Hendricks. Hendricks was the only nominee, and won the nomination nearly unanimously on the first ballot, with the only exceptions being eight abstentions from Ohio.

Vice Presidential Ballot
Candidate	1st
Hendricks	730
Blank	8

Source: Official proceedings of the National Democratic convention, held in St. Louis, Mo., June 27th, 28th and 29th, 1876. (September 3, 2012).

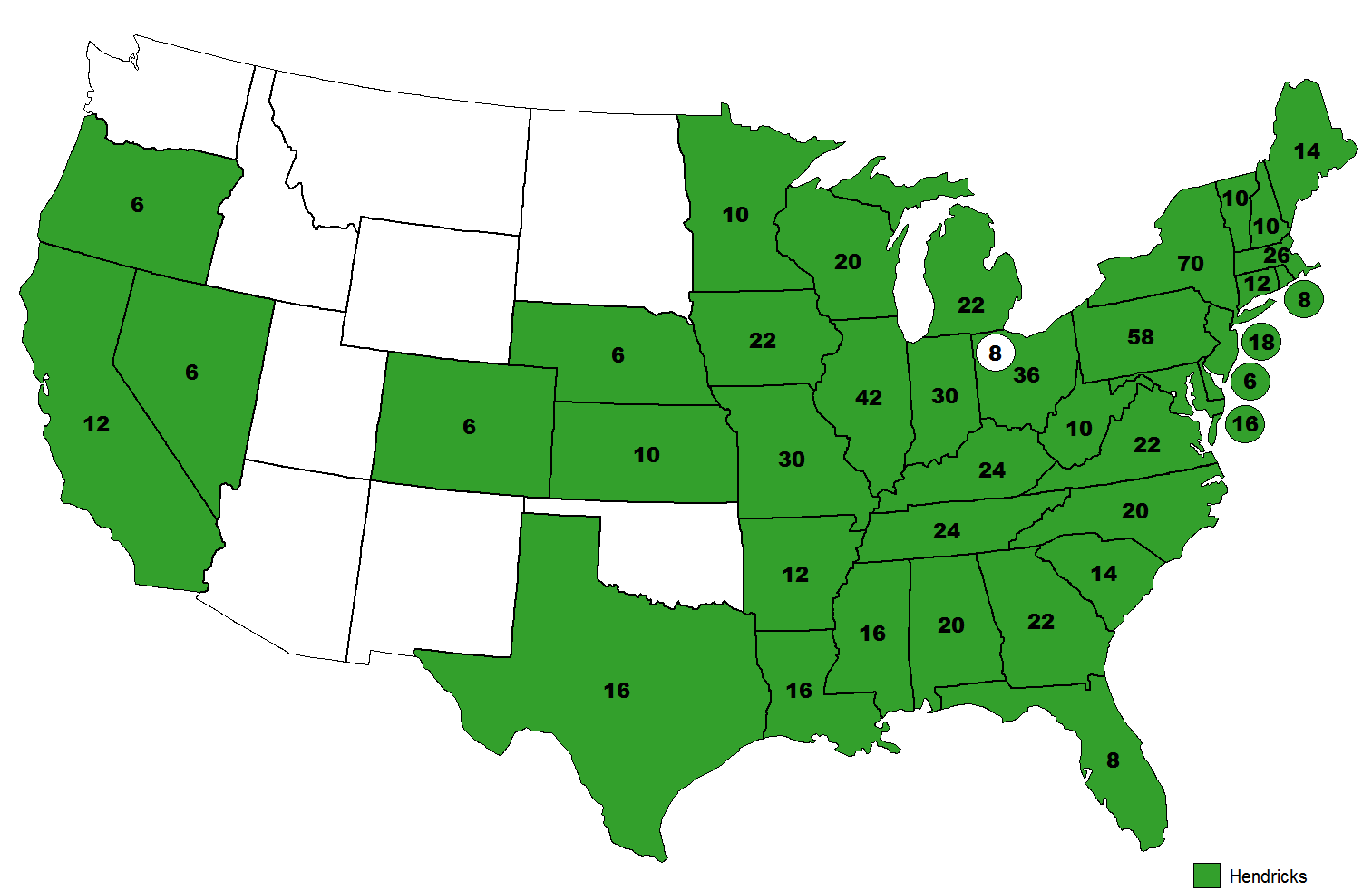
1st Vice Presidential Ballot

== See also ==
- 1876 Republican National Convention
- List of Democratic National Conventions
- U.S. presidential nomination convention
- 1876 United States presidential election
- History of the United States Democratic Party

Preceded by 1872; Baltimore, Maryland	Democratic National Conventions	Succeeded by 1880; Cincinnati, Ohio
