= Joseph Charless =

- Born: 16 July 1772; Killicun, County Westmeath, Leinster, Ireland
- Died: 28 July 1834 (aged 62)
- Occupation(s): Printer, publisher
- Known for: Founded three newspapers
- Spouse: Sarah McCloud (m. 1798)
- Children: 8, including 1 step child

Joseph Charless (16 July 1772 – 28 July 1834), born Joseph Charles, was an Irish immigrant to the United States, where he became known as a printer, publisher and editor, founding three newspapers in Kentucky and Missouri in the early 19th-century. After working in Philadelphia, he moved and founded the Independent Gazeteer and the Louisville Gazette, both in Kentucky, and lastly, Missouri Gazette in St. Louis, Missouri.

== Early life and education ==
Joseph Charles was born on 16 July 1772, in Killicun, County Westmeath, Leinster, Ireland. He was of Welsh descent, the son of Edward and Ann Chapman Charles. As a young man he took part in the Irish Rebellion of 1795 and was forced to flee the country for France.

== Immigration, career and marriage ==
He immigrated to America, arriving in New York City in 1796. He added an "s" to his surname to secure the Irish pronunciation of Char-less as two syllables. A printer by trade, Charless found employment in Philadelphia with Mathew Carey, another Irish refugee.

In 1798, he married Sarah (Jordan) McCloud, a widow with a three-year-old son, Robert McCloud. The new couple had seven children together: Edward, John, Joseph, Ann or Anne, Eliza, Chapman, and Sarah.

The family moved to Lexington, Kentucky, in 1800, where Charless was hired as a printer. In partnership with Francis Peniston, he began a newspaper, the Independent Gazetteer, on 29 March 1803. He formed a partnership with Robert Kay on 16 August 1803, but he withdrew from the connection on 27 September. He continued as a printer, publisher, and bookseller in Lexington until 1807, then moved with his family to Louisville, Kentucky, where he established the Louisville Gazette.

He continued the Louisville Gazette while at the same time moving to St. Louis, Missouri, where he founded the Missouri Gazette. Its first issue appeared on 12 July 1808, with 174 subscribers. It was on foolscap sheets, measuring about 8-1/4 x 12-1/2 inches, in three columns. After another year, he sold the Louisville newspaper in July 1809. He continued to operate the Missouri Gazette until 1820, when he sold it.

Charless died on 28 July 1834, at age 62. In religion, he was a Presbyterian.

== Confrontations ==
An account printed in several newspapers in 1933 said of Charless that

"For articles that appeared in his newspaper, whether he was the author of them or not, he was sometimes attacked on the streets of St. Louis. Once a prominent man spit in his face and threatened him with a pistol. Another time Charless was shot at, but unharmed, by a hidden enemy as he walked in his garden."

What was described as "one of the most important incidents in the . . . history of Missouri journalism took place" in the Missouri Gazette office on 6 February 1814, when five men, one of them armed with a sword, confronted Charless. They demanded to know who had written an article signed "Q," which had criticized the military qualifications of U.S. General Benjamin Howard. Refused, the men left, but later "The direct result of the encounter was the founding in May 1815 of Missouri's second newspaper, the Western Journal, by Charless's enemies." Howard was the first governor of the Missouri Territory and fought in the War of 1812, still underway at the time of this incident.
