= Community correspondent =

A community correspondent, also known as a rural correspondent or country correspondent, is someone who produces a regular column on community events, places and people for publication in their local—typically weekly—newspaper. The writer is generally not a regular member of the newspaper staff but is a stringer who receives little or no pay for their submissions, outside of a free subscription to the periodical.

== Content ==
The columns produced by community correspondents almost universally focus on community events at an extremely localized scale, often from a personal viewpoint. The writers typically have little professional journalistic training and instead of building their articles around major events and themes often focus on the day to day lives and interactions of the people and places in their community. It is not uncommon to read reports of new babies, vacations, recently purchased automobiles and church suppers in these pieces.

== History ==
Sometimes referred to as "chicken-dinner news" or "country letters", these columns have been a staple in local newspapers in the United States for around 100 years, offering editors cheap copy to fill pages with, while also providing a unique look at local events and news.

== Current trends and challenges ==
A majority of the 7,500 weekly newspapers across the United States continue to depend upon these community correspondents for help in reporting local news. These columns remain some of the most popular sections in them, despite the advent of blogs and other information heavy social media. One difficulty that modern newspapers have discovered for continuing this tradition is a lack of available writers. Most writers of these columns tend to be older and women, though not universally so, and when they are no longer able to produce regular submissions, editors have found a lack of replacements for a job that receives little compensation. Another challenge editors at newspapers with community correspondents often face is how to make necessary edits for readability and to protect personal privacy in a column while retaining the writer's personality, which can be a bigger draw than the news itself.
