= 1904 Missouri Secretary of State election =

- November 8, 1904

Nominee	John Ephraim Swanger	Sam Baker Cook
Party	Republican	Democratic
Popular vote	320,824	296,844
Percentage	49.96%	46.22%
Secretary of State before election
Sam Baker Cook
Democratic
Elected Secretary of State
John Ephraim Swanger
Republican

The 1904 Missouri Secretary of State election was held on November 8, 1904, in order to elect the secretary of state of Missouri. Republican nominee John Ephraim Swanger defeated Democratic nominee and incumbent secretary of state Sam Baker Cook, Socialist nominee Charles W. Wilkerson, Prohibition nominee William F. Brennecke, People's nominee Abram Neff and Socialist Labor nominee O. M. Howard.

== General election ==
On election day, November 8, 1904, Republican nominee John Ephraim Swanger won the election by a margin of 23,980 votes against his foremost opponent Democratic nominee Sam Baker Cook, thereby gaining Republican control over the office of secretary of state. Swanger was sworn in as the 21st secretary of state of Missouri on January 9, 1905.

=== Results ===
Missouri Secretary of State election, 1904
Party	Candidate	Votes	%
Republican	John Ephraim Swanger	320,824	49.96
Democratic	Sam Baker Cook (incumbent)	296,844	46.22
Socialist	Charles W. Wilkerson	12,482	1.94
Prohibition	William F. Brennecke	6,788	1.06
Populist	Abram Neff	3,645	0.57
Socialist Labor	O. M. Howard	1,601	0.25
Total votes		642,184	100.00
Republican gain from Democratic			

== See also ==
- 1904 Missouri gubernatorial election
