= 1904 Missouri State Auditor election =

- November 8, 1904

Nominee	William Werner Wilder	Albert Otis Allen
Party	Republican	Democratic
Popular vote	319,988	298,024
Percentage	49.79%	46.37%
State Auditor before election
Albert Otis Allen
Democratic
Elected State Auditor
William Werner Wilder
Republican

The 1904 Missouri State Auditor election was held on November 8, 1904, in order to elect the state auditor of Missouri. Republican nominee William Werner Wilder defeated Democratic nominee and incumbent state auditor Albert Otis Allen, Socialist nominee William M. Brandt, Prohibition nominee George H. Gibson, People's nominee William H. Mills and Socialist Labor nominee Joseph W. Molineux.

== General election ==
On election day, November 8, 1904, Republican nominee William Werner Wilder won the election by a margin of 21,964 votes against his foremost opponent Democratic nominee Albert Otis Allen, thereby gaining Republican control over the office of state auditor. Wilder was sworn in as the 21st state auditor of Missouri on January 9, 1905.

=== Results ===
Missouri State Auditor election, 1904
Party	Candidate	Votes	%
Republican	William Werner Wilder	319,988	49.79
Democratic	Albert Otis Allen (incumbent)	298,024	46.37
Socialist	William M. Brandt	12,534	1.95
Prohibition	George H. Gibson	6,856	1.07
Populist	William H. Mills	3,750	0.58
Socialist Labor	Joseph W. Molineux	1,592	0.24
Total votes		642,744	100.00
Republican gain from Democratic			

== See also ==
- 1904 Missouri gubernatorial election
