= Henry Overstolz =

Mayor of St. Louis

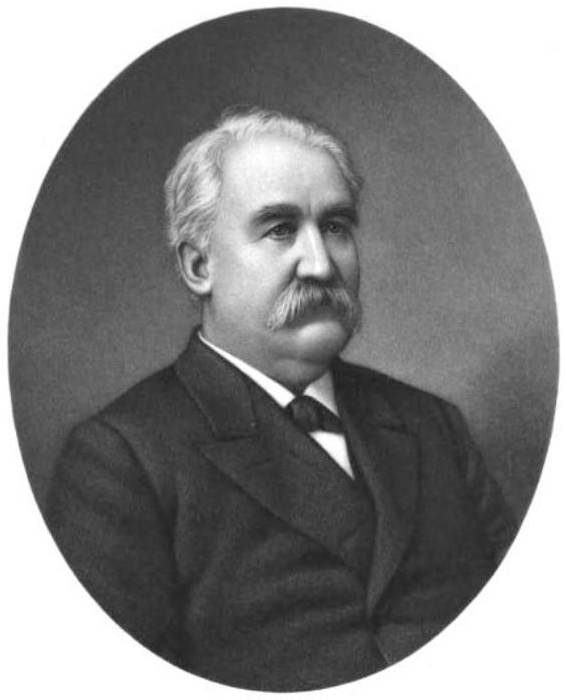

24th Mayor of St. Louis, Missouri
- In office February 9, 1876 – April 12, 1881
- Preceded by: James H. Britton
- Succeeded by: William L. Ewing

Personal details
- Born: Henry Clemens von Overstolz; July 4, 1821 Münster, Kingdom of Prussia
- Died: November 29, 1887 (aged 66) St. Louis, Missouri, U.S.
- Party: Independent
- Spouse: Philippina Espenshied
- Children: Lucile A., Ida, Charles Henry, Marie, Catherine Philippine

Henry Overstolz (born Henry Clemens von Overstolz; July 4, 1821 – November 29, 1887) was the 24th mayor of St. Louis, Missouri, serving from 1876 to 1881. He was a direct descendant of the oldest patrician family of Cologne, Germany (the Cologne patricians). He exerted a wide influence on public thought, public actions, political affairs, and business activity.

== Early life ==
Born in Munster, Kingdom of Prussia on July 4, 1821, to William von Overstoltz and Therese Buse. His father William was born in Duisburg, Westphalia in 1780 and died in St. Louis in 1853. His mother Therese was born in Paderborn, Westphalia in 1790 and died in St. Louis in 1862. Henry moved to St. Louis in 1846, where he entered the merchandising business. Aside from his business prosperity, Henry could lay claim to eminent services rendered to his fellow-citizens in a political life as satisfactory, as it was honorable.

== Political career ==
Henry involved himself in the city's government and, in 1847, was elected to membership in the City Council. In 1853, Henry was elected as the city's comptroller, becoming the first native-born German to be elected to office in St. Louis. Later, in 1871, he was elected president of the city council. Henry ran for mayor as an independent in April 1875, but lost to Arthur Barret.

Following Barret's sudden death a scant three weeks after his election, Henry again ran for mayor in the special mayoral election that followed. He lost to his opponent James Britton. Henry contested the election two days later, alleging, among other irregularities, ballot stuffing. In February 1876, after a recount of the ballots, Henry unseated Britton and was declared mayor, having won by 77 votes out of more than 29,000 votes cast. He was a supporter of the Charter and Scheme that separated the city of St. Louis from St. Louis County in 1876.

In 1877, Henry was endorsed by both the Democrat and Republican conventions for his reelection, in addition to a petition in the Missouri Republican of several thousand residents asking him to run for reelection. As a result of the new city charter, Henry became the first mayor of St. Louis elected to a four-year term when he was reelected in 1877. During the course of his mayorship, Henry worked to reorganize the city government and forge new relationships with the county and state resulting from the changes instituted by the new city charter. Henry sought a third term as mayor, but was defeated by William Ewing in the 1881 mayoral election.

== Personal life ==
In 1875, Henry married Philippina Espenshied (later known as Philippine E. Von Overstolz, May 1, 1847 – September 6, 1925). He was a widower when he married Philippine. Philippine and Henry had six children.

Philippine was the daughter of a successful Western wagon-maker, Louis Espenschied, who was the owner of Louis Espenschied Wagon Co. Henry died on November 29, 1887, and was buried in Bellefontaine Cemetery in St. Louis. One of his legacies to her was a large library and a collection of paintings, valued at the time at $100,000 which was widely exhibited at large fairs and exhibitions.

Among their children were Charles Henry von Overstolz Ida von Overstolz, Marie E. von Overstolz, Catherine Philippine von Overstolz, and Lucile Alice von Overstolz (March 29, 1876 – June 22, 1948), who married Maximillian Joseph Koeck.

Political offices
Preceded by James H. Britton	Mayor of St. Louis, Missouri; 1876 – 1881	Succeeded by William L. Ewing
