= 1888 Missouri Secretary of State election =

- November 6, 1888

Nominee	Alexander A. Lesueur	F. W. Mott
Party	Democratic	Republican
Popular vote	261,301	236,855
Percentage	50.12%	45.43%
Secretary of State before election
Michael Knowles McGrath
Democratic
Elected Secretary of State
Alexander A. Lesueur
Democratic

The 1888 Missouri Secretary of State election was held on November 6, 1888, in order to elect the secretary of state of Missouri. Democratic nominee Alexander A. Lesueur defeated Republican nominee F. W. Mott, Union Labor nominee Boswell Fox and Prohibition nominee Herman P. Faris.

== General election ==
On election day, November 6, 1888, Democratic nominee Alexander A. Lesueur won the election by a margin of 24,446 votes against his foremost opponent Republican nominee F. W. Mott, thereby retaining Democratic control over the office of secretary of state. Lesueur was sworn in as the 19th secretary of state of Missouri on January 14, 1889.

=== Results ===
Missouri Secretary of State election, 1888
Party	Candidate	Votes	%
Democratic	Alexander A. Lesueur	261,301	50.12
Republican	F. W. Mott	236,855	45.43
Union Labor	Boswell Fox	18,769	3.60
Prohibition	Herman P. Faris	4,399	0.85
Total votes		521,324	100.00
Democratic hold			

== See also ==
- 1888 Missouri gubernatorial election
