= Rolla Wells =

American politician (1856–1944)

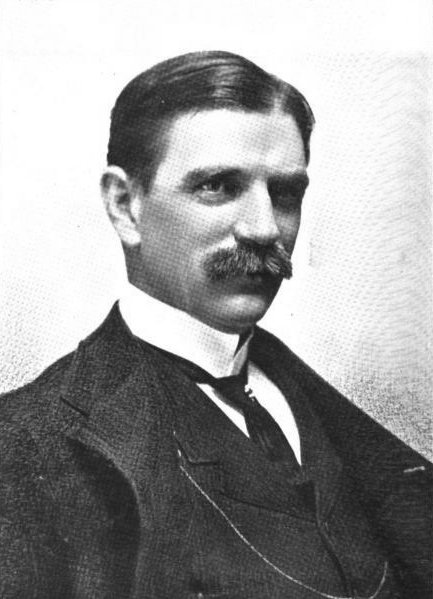

President of the Federal Reserve Bank of St. Louis
- In office October 28, 1914 – February 5, 1919
- Preceded by: Position established
- Succeeded by: David Biggs

Treasurer of the Democratic National Committee
- In office August 6, 1912 – June 17, 1916
- Preceded by: Herman Ridder
- Succeeded by: Wilbur W. Marsh

30th Mayor of St. Louis
- In office April 9, 1901 – April 13, 1909
- Preceded by: Henry Ziegenhein
- Succeeded by: Frederick Kreismann

Personal details
- Born: June 1, 1856 St. Louis, Missouri, U.S.
- Died: November 30, 1944 (aged 88) St. Louis, Missouri, U.S.
- Party: Democratic
- Education: Washington University in St. Louis; Princeton University

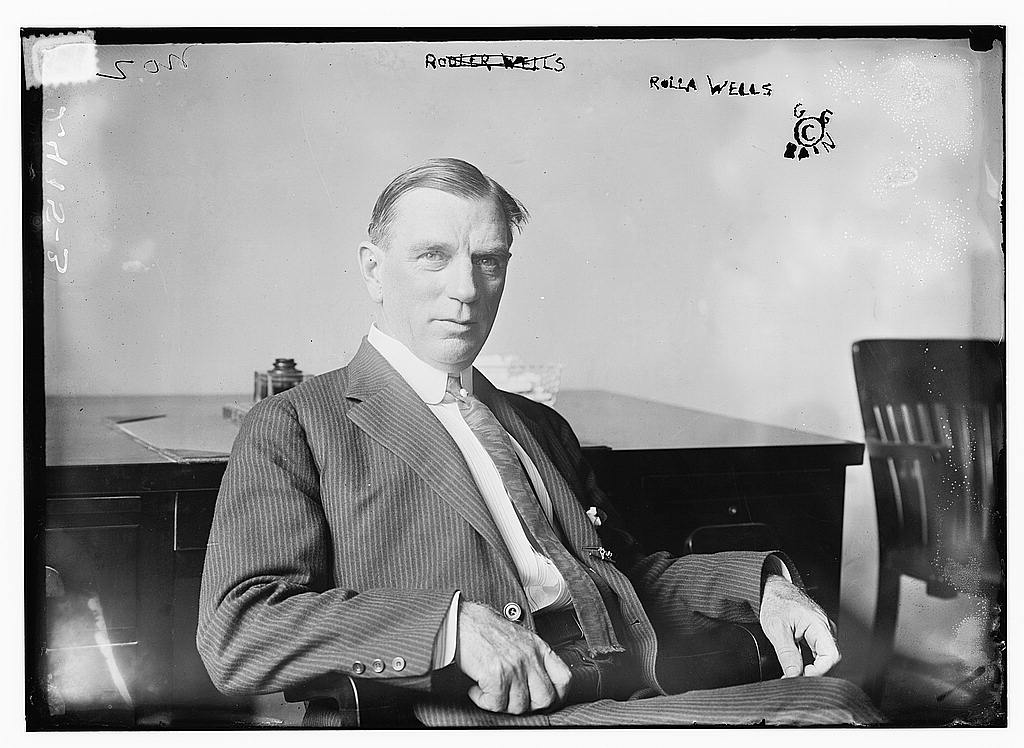
Wells circa 1915

Rolla Wells (June 1, 1856 – November 30, 1944), also called "Rollo", was an American politician. He served two terms as Mayor of St. Louis, Missouri, was named an officer of the Democratic National Committee in the 1912 Wilson campaign, and served as Governor of the St. Louis branch of the Federal Reserve Bank.

== Biography ==
Wells was born in St. Louis, Missouri, on June 1, 1856 to Erastus Wells and Isabella Bowman Henry Wells. His father was a representative from Missouri. Wells was educated at Washington University in St. Louis and Princeton University, and later in life received honorary MA degrees from both institutions.

His name first appears in print in the on October 9, 1892, edition of New York Times, where he is described as the "President of the Fair Association" for St. Louis. In the March 18, 1893, edition, he is quoted as the "President of the Jockey Club" of St. Louis; and the July 16, 1896, edition includes the statement "Rolla Wells, President of the Jefferson Club, resigned last night, announcing that he could not support the Chicago platform" (the "Chicago platform" referring to William Jennings Bryan).

Wells ran for and was elected Mayor of St. Louis in 1901, with the New York Times reporting that "One of the hardest fought municipal campaigns in the history of St Louis closed to-night" and that the candidates were "Rolla Wells, Democratic; George W. Parker, Republican; Chauncey I. Filley, Good Government; Lee Meriwether, Public Ownership; Leon Greenbaum, Social-Democrat, and Lewis C. Fry, Socialist-Labor."

Wells was Mayor of St. Louis for eight years, during which time the World's Fair and the Olympics were held there. Some of his major accomplishment included overseeing the construction of a new city hall in 1903, the paving of many city streets, and—in 1904—making the city's drinking water run clear for the first time.

In 1912, Governor Woodrow Wilson, Democratic candidate for President, named Wells treasurer of the Democratic National Committee, where he served until Wilbur W. Marsh was appointed in 1916.

Around 1914 to 1916, Wells was named Governor of the Federal Reserve Bank of St. Louis. He held the position until 1919, when he was named Receiver for the United Railways of St. Louis.

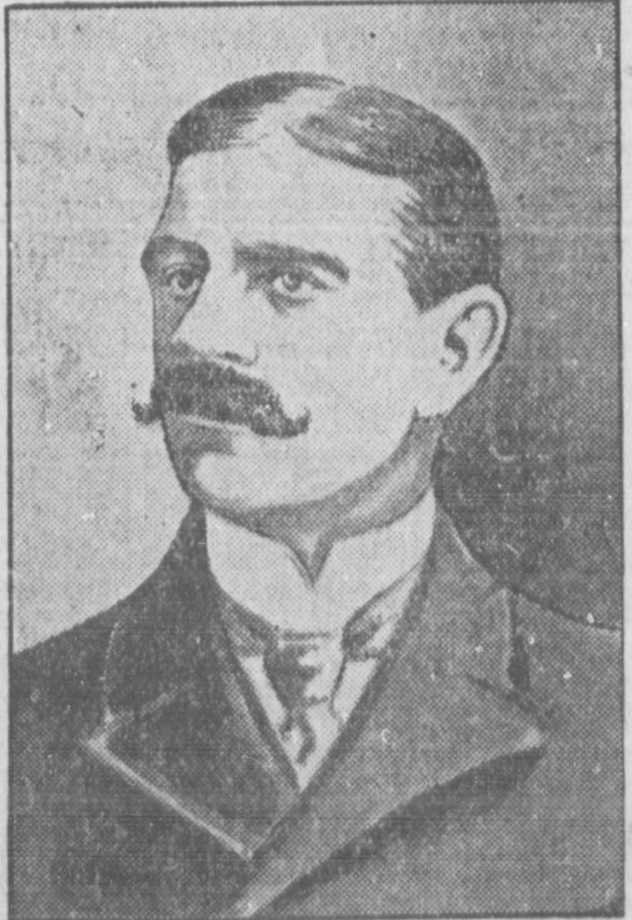
Wells circa 1901

He died on November 30, 1944, and was buried at Bellefontaine Cemetery.

=== Family life ===
His first wife, Jennie Howard Parker, died in 1917. He later wed Mrs. Carlotta Clark Church, widow of Alonzo Church, on November 18, 1923, in St. Louis.

== Publications ==
- Episodes of My Life (1933)

Political offices
Preceded by Henry Ziegenhein	Mayor of St. Louis; 1901–1909	Succeeded by Frederick Kreismann
