= Joseph Brown (Missouri politician) =

American politician (1823–1899)

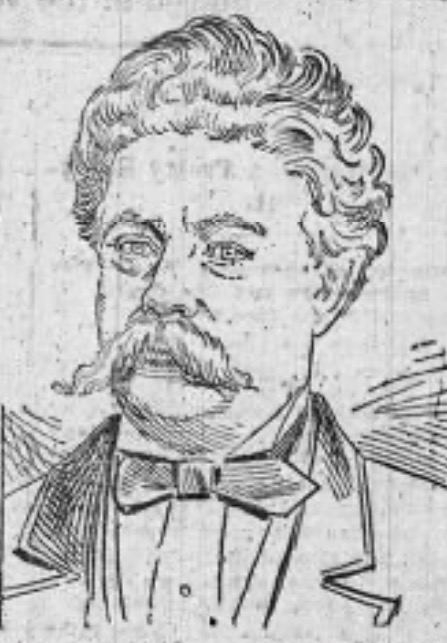

21st Mayor of St. Louis, Missouri
- In office 1871 – April 13, 1875
- Preceded by: Nathan Cole
- Succeeded by: Arthur Barret

Mayor of Alton, Illinois
- In office 1856–1857

Personal details
- Born: 1823 Jedburgh, Scotland
- Died: December 3, 1899 (aged 75–76) St. Louis, Missouri, US
- Party: War Democrat
- Spouse: Virginia Brown

Joseph Brown (1823 – December 3, 1899) was an American politician who served as mayor of Alton, Illinois, from 1856 to 1857, and as the 21st mayor of St. Louis, Missouri, from 1871 to 1875.

== Childhood and young adulthood ==
Brown was born in 1823 in Jedburgh, Scotland. He lived there with his family until he turned eight. Afterwards, he and his family immigrated to the United States, settling down in Alton, Illinois. Brown received a good education, partially completing his college career before going to work in the milling business at the age 18.

After a few years, Brown met Miss Virginia Keach. In 1854, they got married, and later had two daughters.

Brown was also well known in the river traffic. He oversaw many of his steamers' construction. At the start of the American Civil War, Brown retired from this business to pursue real estate operations. However, he continued on assisting in the construction in many of the gunboats and ironclad ships for the Navy.

== Political career ==
Before becoming elected to being the St. Louis Mayor, Brown served as the head of the City government and Mayor of Alton, IL. During this time period, Brown successfully connected Chicago and Alton with a railroad. As a war democrat, he additionally was elected to the Missouri State Senate.

in 1871, Brown was elected to be the Mayor of St. Louis. Within his second year after being elected, Brown helped oversee the creation of a temporary City Hall (where the present Civil Courts Building is) and the taxpayers' League. This league's purpose was to "aid in securing honesty, economy and efficiency in the administration of municipal affairs and public affairs." In 1873, the city faced a critical depression. In order to help alleviate the citizens, Brown ran a soup kitchen for as many as 1200 people per day and issued tax certificates of $300,000, which was also known as "Brown Bucks". To support them, Brown used his own credit as well as the city's. His administration also oversaw the creation of three of the city's largest parks: Forest Park, O'Fallon Park, and Carondelet Park. Brown also helped administer the completion of the Eads Bridge.

== Later life and death ==
On December 3, 1899, Brown died. He was buried in Grandview Cemetery in Alton, Illinois.

Political offices
| Preceded by Nathan Cole | Mayor of St. Louis, Missouri; 1871–1875 | Succeeded by Arthur Barret |
