= William L. Ewing =

American politician

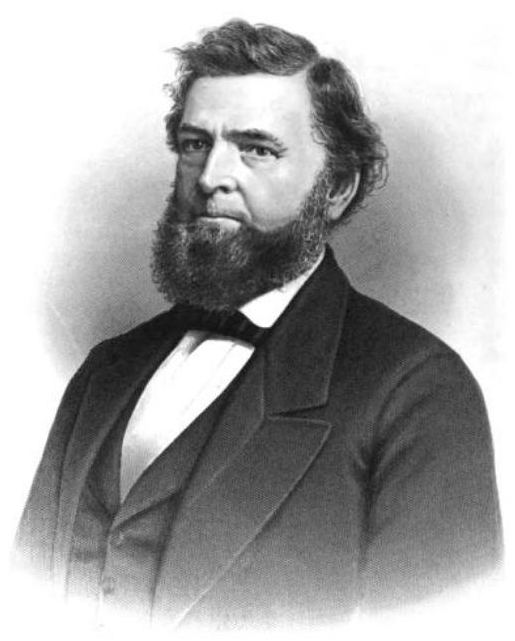

25th Mayor of St. Louis, Missouri
- In office April 12, 1881 – April 14, 1885
- Preceded by: Henry Overstolz
- Succeeded by: David R. Francis

Personal details
- Born: William Lane Ewing; March 16, 1843 St. Louis, Missouri, U.S.
- Died: June 4, 1905 (aged 62) Vincennes, Indiana, U.S.
- Resting place: Calvary Cemetery
- Party: Republican
- Spouse: Mary Flemming (m. 1880)
- Children: William Ewing
- Parent(s): William L. Ewing and Clara Berthold Ewing
- Education: Christian Brothers College
- Profession: Banker

William Lane Ewing (March 16, 1843 – June 4, 1905) was the 25th mayor of St. Louis, Missouri, serving from 1881 to 1885. Ewing helped organize the State National Bank in 1885 and was a member of its board of directors. During his administration the cable car was introduced to the city, 12 miles of business streets were paved, and the St. Louis Exposition and Music Hall was constructed.

== Biography ==
William L. Ewing was born in St. Louis on March 16, 1843.

He graduated from Christian Brothers College and became a clerk in his father's prosperous wholesale grocery business for many years. The firm was dissolved following the elder Ewing's death in 1873. Young Mr. Ewing became prominent in banking circles and also had farming and investment interests. In 1880, he married Miss Mary Flemming of Indianapolis, and they had one son, William.

He was sworn in as Mayor of St. Louis on April 12, 1881. During his tenure, the St. Louis Exposition and Music Hall was completed, and cable car lines were introduced. He was succeeded by David R. Francis on April 14, 1885.

He died in Vincennes, Indiana on June 4, 1905. He was buried at Calvary Cemetery in St. Louis.

Political offices
Preceded by Henry Overstolz	Mayor of St. Louis, Missouri; 1881–1885	Succeeded by David R. Francis
