= David R. Francis =

American politician and diplomat (1850–1927)

David Francis
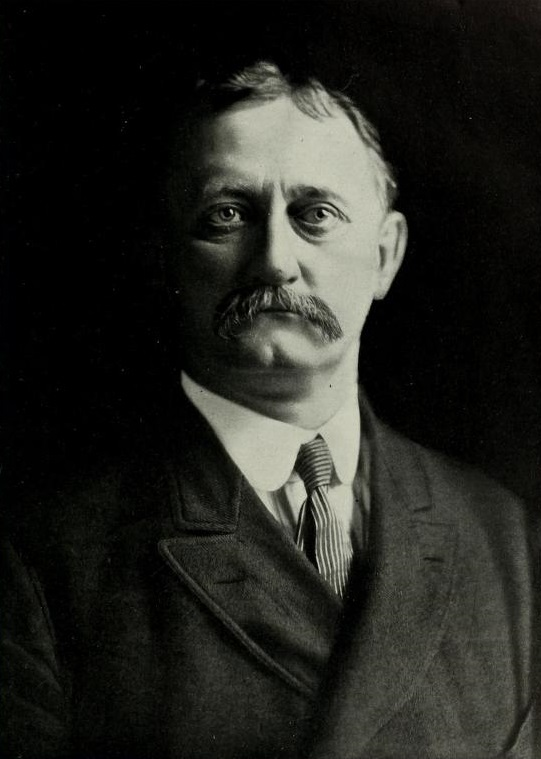

United States Ambassador to Russia
- In office May 5, 1916 – November 7, 1917
- President: Woodrow Wilson
- Preceded by: George Marye
- Succeeded by: William Christian Bullitt Jr. (as Ambassador to Soviet Union)

President of the Organizing Committee for the Olympic Games
- In office October 28, 1900 – September 3, 1904
- President: Pierre de Coubertin
- Preceded by: Pierre de Coubertin
- Succeeded by: Edward Battell

20th United States Secretary of the Interior
- In office September 3, 1896 – March 5, 1897
- President: Grover Cleveland; William McKinley
- Preceded by: Hoke Smith
- Succeeded by: Cornelius Bliss

27th Governor of Missouri
- In office January 14, 1889 – January 9, 1893
- Lieutenant: Stephen Claycomb
- Preceded by: Albert P. Morehouse
- Succeeded by: William J. Stone

26th Mayor of St. Louis
- In office April 14, 1885 – January 2, 1889
- Preceded by: William L. Ewing
- Succeeded by: Edward A. Noonan

Personal details
- Born: David Rowland Francis; October 1, 1850 Richmond, Kentucky, U.S.
- Died: January 15, 1927 (aged 76) St. Louis, Missouri, U.S.
- Resting place: Bellefontaine Cemetery
- Party: Democratic
- Spouse: Jane Perry (m. 1876; died 1924)
- Children: 6
- Education: Washington University in St. Louis (BA)
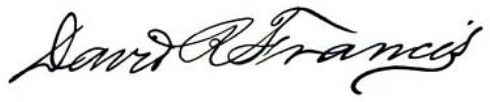
- Signature

David Rowland Francis (October 1, 1850 – January 15, 1927) was an American politician and diplomat. He served in various positions including Mayor of St. Louis, the 27th governor of Missouri, and United States Secretary of the Interior. He was the U.S. Ambassador to Russia between 1916 and 1917, during the Russian Revolution of 1917. He was a Wilsonian Democrat.

== Early life ==
Francis was born on October 1, 1850, in Richmond, Kentucky, the son of Eliza Caldwell (née Rowland) (1830–1898) and John Broaddus Francis (1818–1894). He graduated from Washington University in St. Louis in 1870 where he was number one on the rolls of the Alpha Iota chapter of Beta Theta Pi fraternity.

== Career ==
After graduating from University, he became a successful businessman in St. Louis and served as the president of a grain merchant's exchange. The St. Louis Mining and Stock Exchange was formed in St. Louis in the fall of 1880 with Francis as a founding member.

In 1885, he was elected mayor of St. Louis as a Democrat. In 1888, he was elected governor of Missouri becoming the only mayor of St. Louis elected governor of the state.

In 1896, Francis was appointed United States Secretary of the Interior by President Grover Cleveland and served until 1897.

=== World's Fair 1904 ===
Francis was one of the main promoters of the St. Louis World's Fair of 1904, serving as president of the Louisiana Purchase Exposition. Historians generally emphasize the prominence of themes of race and empire, and the Fair's long-lasting impact on intellectuals in the fields of history, art history, architecture and anthropology. From the point of view of the memory of the average person who attended the fair, it primarily promoted entertainment, consumer goods and popular culture.

The 1904 Summer Olympics were held in combination with that Exposition, and by overseeing the opening ceremony, Francis became the only American to have opened an Olympic Games without ever serving as president or vice president of the United States.

=== Later career ===
In 1905, after being elected president of the Louisiana Purchase Exposition Company, he was sent to Europe by the World's Fair directors to thank kings, emperors, and other rulers for their part in making the exposition a success. He was decorated by the emperors of Germany and Austria and Wilhelmina, the Queen of the Netherlands.

In 1910, Francis was arrested for non-payment of taxes, but released on bail.

=== Diplomatic career ===
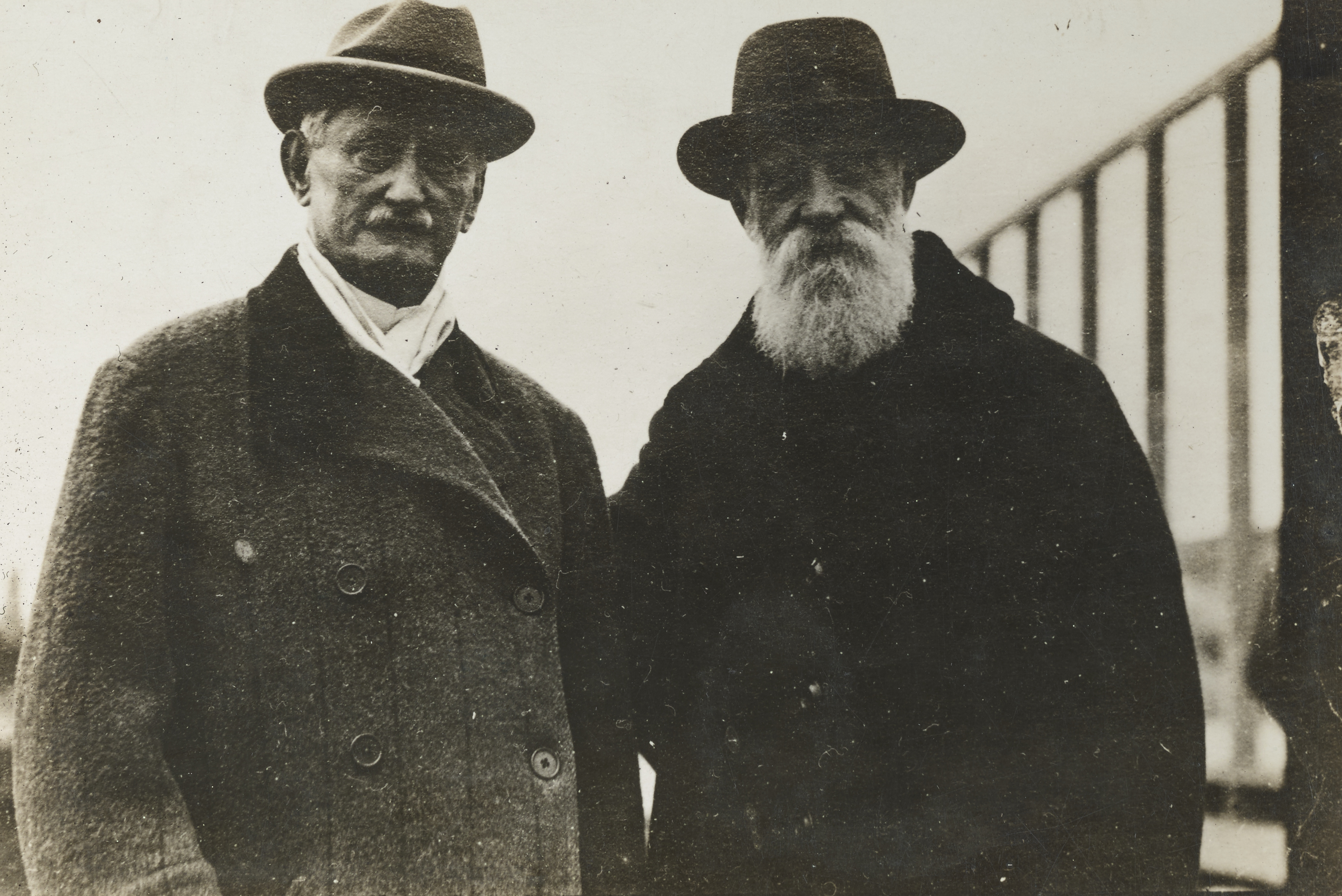
Ambassador Francis and with Nikolai Tchaikovsky, c. 1918

President Woodrow Wilson appointed Francis as the last U.S. Ambassador to the Russian Empire between 1916 and 1917. He escaped a communist-organized assassination attempt late in 1916. During Francis's time as ambassador, he was almost appointed as U.S. Senator from Missouri. He served in that post during both the social-democratic February Revolution and communist October Revolution of 1917, and through him the U.S. recognized the brief Russian Republic (and not the subsequent Bolshevik regime that seized power in the October Revolution).

Francis was the final owner of the St. Louis Republic, a morning newspaper which he sold after years of losses to the rival St. Louis Globe-Democrat in 1919. His biographer, Harper Barnes, summarized his personality. In 1922 president Warren Harding nominated Francis as governor general of the Philippines

David R. Francis was a brash, opinionated, stubborn, smart, sometimes foolish, straight-talking, quick-acting, independent-minded, proud, self-made man who represented the United States in Russia for two and a half years, during the most tumultuous era in that country's history. Much of his activity has been shrouded in myth – some of that heroic, more of that comic and tragic.

== Personal life ==
On January 20, 1876, he married the former Jane Perry (1854–1924), the daughter of John Dietz Perry (1815–1895) and a granddaughter of James Earickson, the former Missouri State Treasurer. They had six children: John David Perry (1876–1950), David Rowland Jr. (1879–1938), Charles Broaddus (1881–1957), Talton Turner (1882–1955), Thomas (1884–1964), and Sidney Rowland Francis (1888–1960).

His wife died in San Antonio, Texas, on March 21, 1924. Francis died in St. Louis, Missouri, on January 15, 1927. He was buried in Bellefontaine Cemetery.

=== Legacy ===
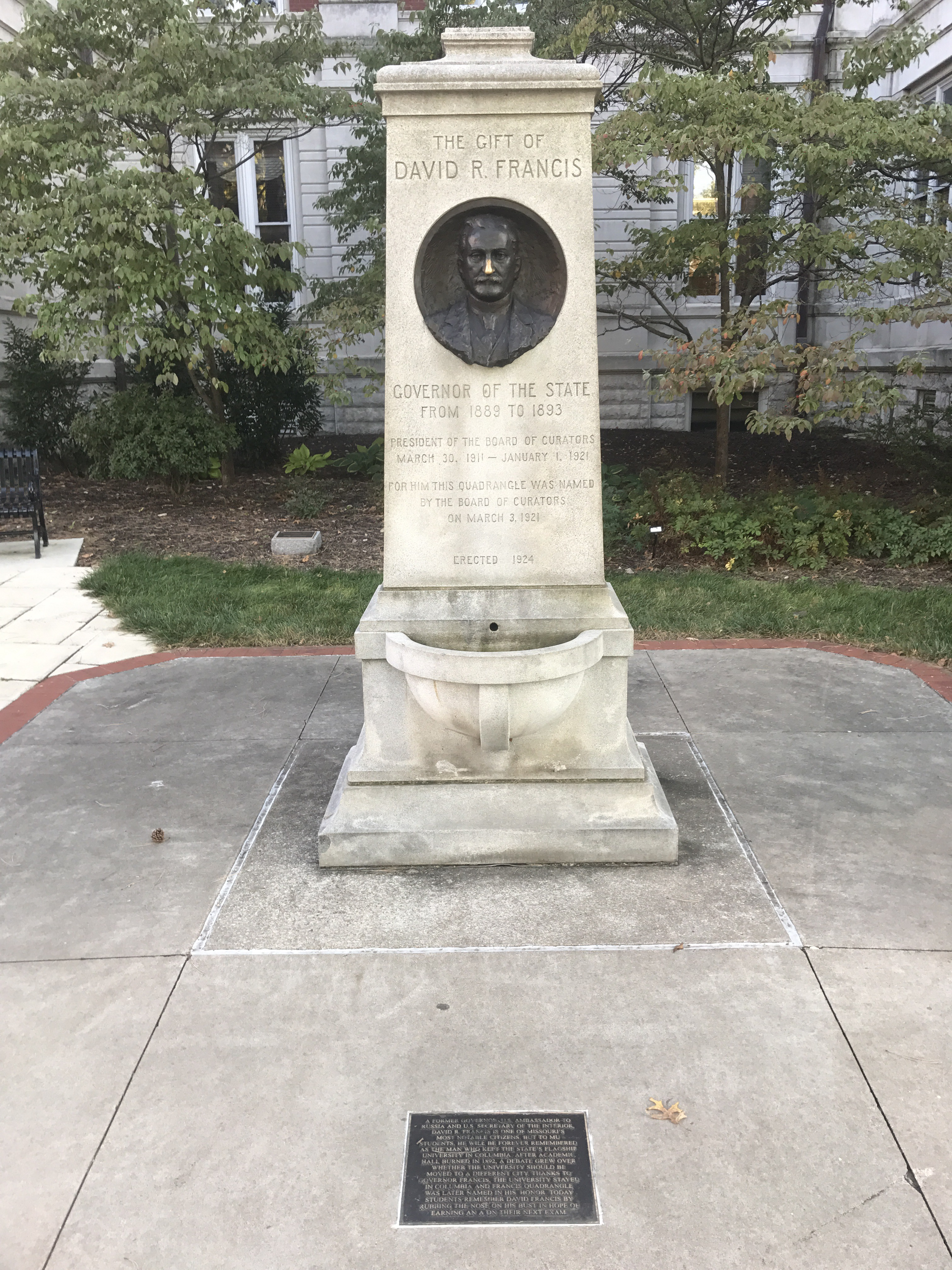
Francis Quadrangle Marker at the University of Missouri

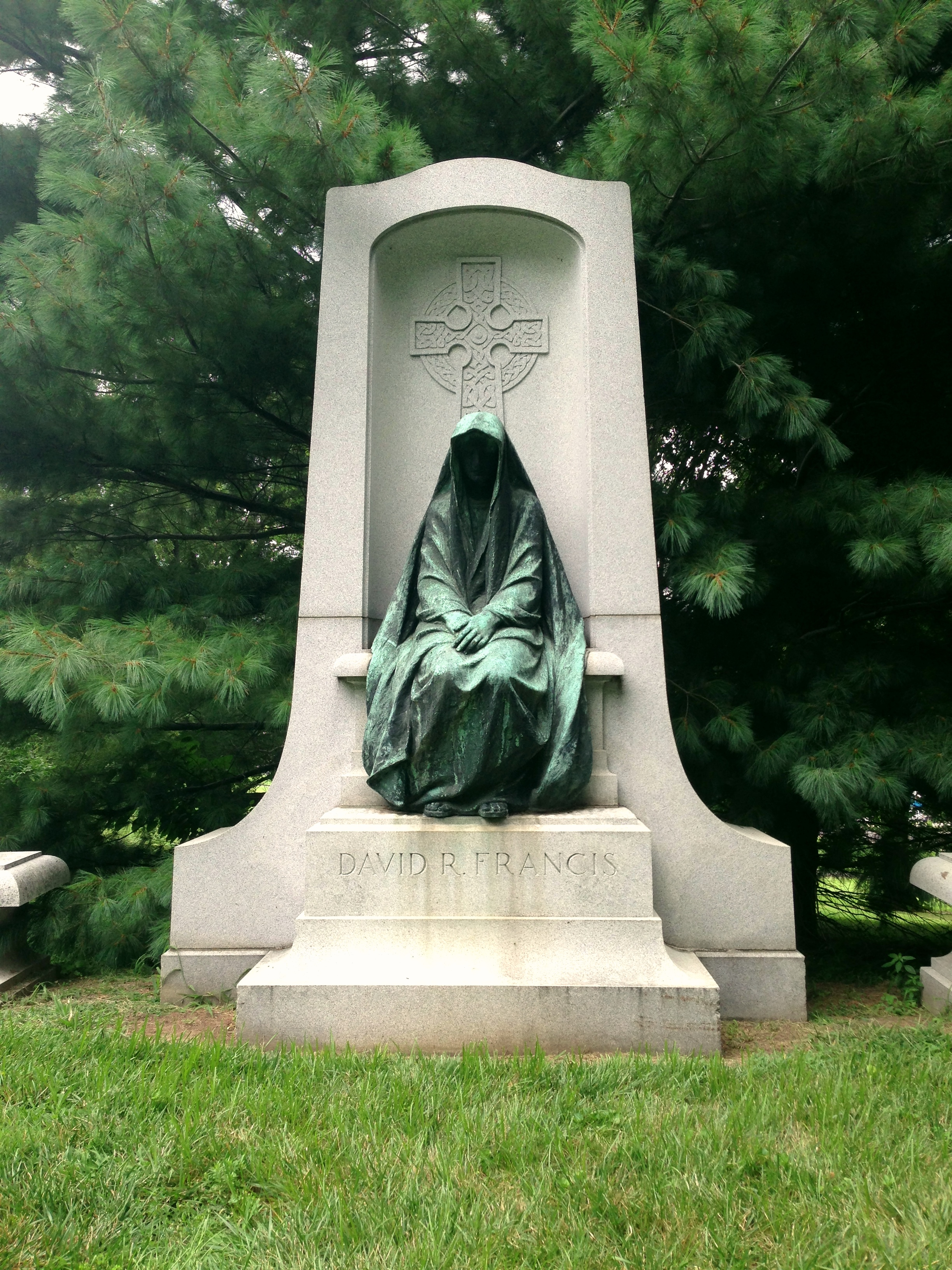
Monument marking Francis's grave in Bellefontaine Cemetery.

In 1895, the University of Missouri dedicated David R. Francis Quadrangle in honor of the former governor who is credited with keeping the university in Columbia after the fire of Academic Hall in 1892. Francis insisted that the state's land-grant university remain in a central location, rather than moving to Sedalia, as many state legislators desired. Instead, Sedalia was awarded the Missouri State Fair as compensation. A bronze bust of Francis' face sits at the south end of Francis Quad near the steps of Jesse Hall. A popular MU student tradition is to rub Governor Francis' nose before taking a test in order to get an A.

The track/soccer/football stadium at Washington University in St. Louis, as well as the adjacent gymnasium, are named in Francis' honor. Francis Field was the site of the 1904 Summer Olympics; Francis attended the opening ceremony and officially opened the games as the representative for the host nation.

In 1916, he gave 60 acres (240,000 m^{2}) of land to the city of St. Louis, Missouri, as a Christmas gift. It was turned into a park that bears his name.

In recognition of his donation of the land, a memorial statue of Francis was installed in Francis Park in the city of St. Louis, Missouri in August 2018. Francis Park is located within the neighborhood of St. Louis Hills. The bronze sculpture of David R. Francis is the work of American artist and sculptor, Harry Weber. The memorial is supported by the group, Friends of Francis Park.

Political offices
Preceded by William L. Ewing	Mayor of St. Louis; 1885–1889	Succeeded by Edward A. Noonan
Preceded by Albert P. Morehouse	Governor of Missouri; 1889–1893	Succeeded by William J. Stone
Preceded by Hoke Smith	United States Secretary of the Interior; 1896–1897	Succeeded by Cornelius Bliss
Party political offices
Preceded by John S. Marmaduke	Democratic nominee for Governor of Missouri; 1888	Succeeded by William J. Stone
Diplomatic posts
Preceded by George Marye	United States Ambassador to Russia; 1916–1917	Succeeded by William Christian Bullitt Jr. as United States Ambassador to the Soviet Union
