= Cyrus Walbridge =

American politician (1849–1921)

Cyrus P. Walbridge
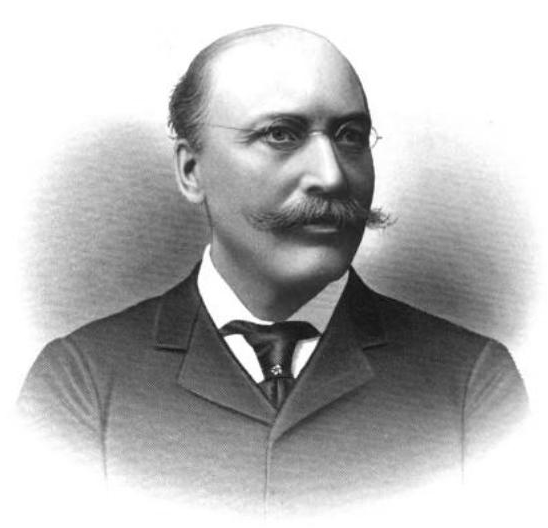

28th Mayor of St. Louis, Missouri
- In office April 8, 1893 – April 10, 1897
- Preceded by: Edward A. Noonan
- Succeeded by: Henry Ziegenhein

Personal details
- Born: July 20, 1849 Madrid, New York
- Died: May 1, 1921 (aged 71) St. Louis, Missouri
- Resting place: Bellefontaine Cemetery
- Party: Republican
- Spouse: Lizzie Merrell (m. 1879)
- Children: 1

Cyrus Packard Walbridge (July 20, 1849 – May 1, 1921) was the 28th mayor of St. Louis, Missouri, serving from 1893 to 1897. He was also the unsuccessful Republican candidate for Governor of Missouri in the 1904 election.

== Biography ==
Cyrus Walbridge was born in Madrid, New York on July 20, 1849. He married Lizzie Merrell on October 9, 1879, and they had one son.

He died at his home in St. Louis on May 1, 1921, and was buried at Bellefontaine Cemetery.

Party political offices
Preceded by Joseph Flory	Republican nominee for Governor of Missouri; 1904	Succeeded by Herbert S. Hadley
Political offices
Preceded by Edward A. Noonan	Mayor of St. Louis, Missouri; 1893–1897	Succeeded by Henry Ziegenhein
