= Wilbur W. Marsh =

Treasurer of the DNC (1862–1929)

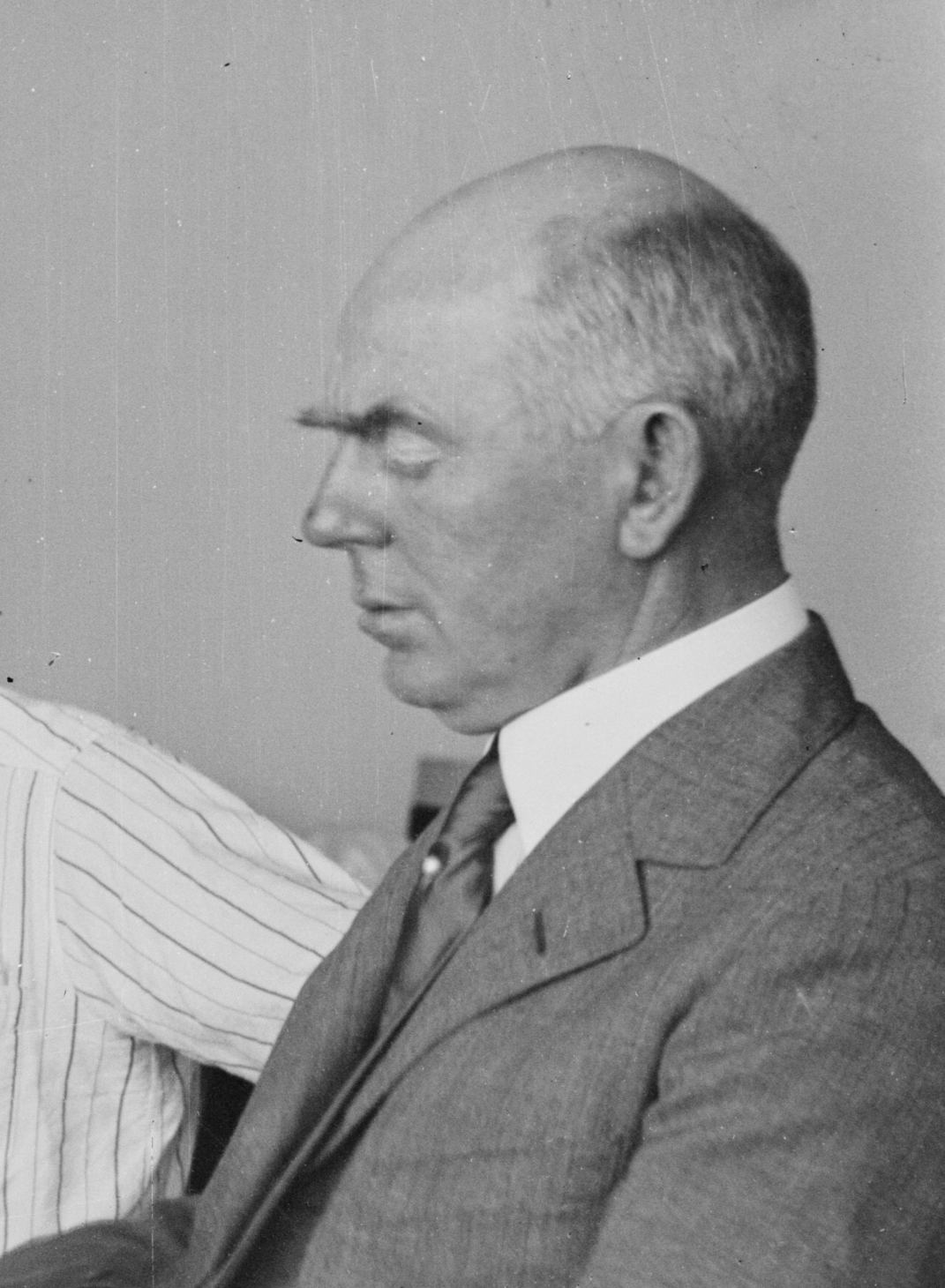

Treasurer of the Democratic National Committee
- In office June 17, 1916 – January 15, 1924
- Preceded by: Rolla Wells
- Succeeded by: James W. Gerard

Personal details
- Born: July 14, 1862 New York State, United States
- Died: December 23, 1929 (aged 67) Waterloo, Iowa
- Party: Democratic

Wilbur W. Marsh (July 14, 1862 - December 23, 1929), was treasurer of the Democratic National Committee.

== Biography ==
He was born in New York on July 14, 1862. He was a Democratic National Committeeman in 1912 and again in 1916. He was the committee's treasurer from 1916 to 1924.

He was a delegate to 1920 Democratic National Convention and the 1928 Democratic National Convention representing Iowa.

Marsh died at his home in Waterloo, Iowa, on December 23, 1929, after having a stroke while driving his car.
