= Henry Ziegenhein =

American politician

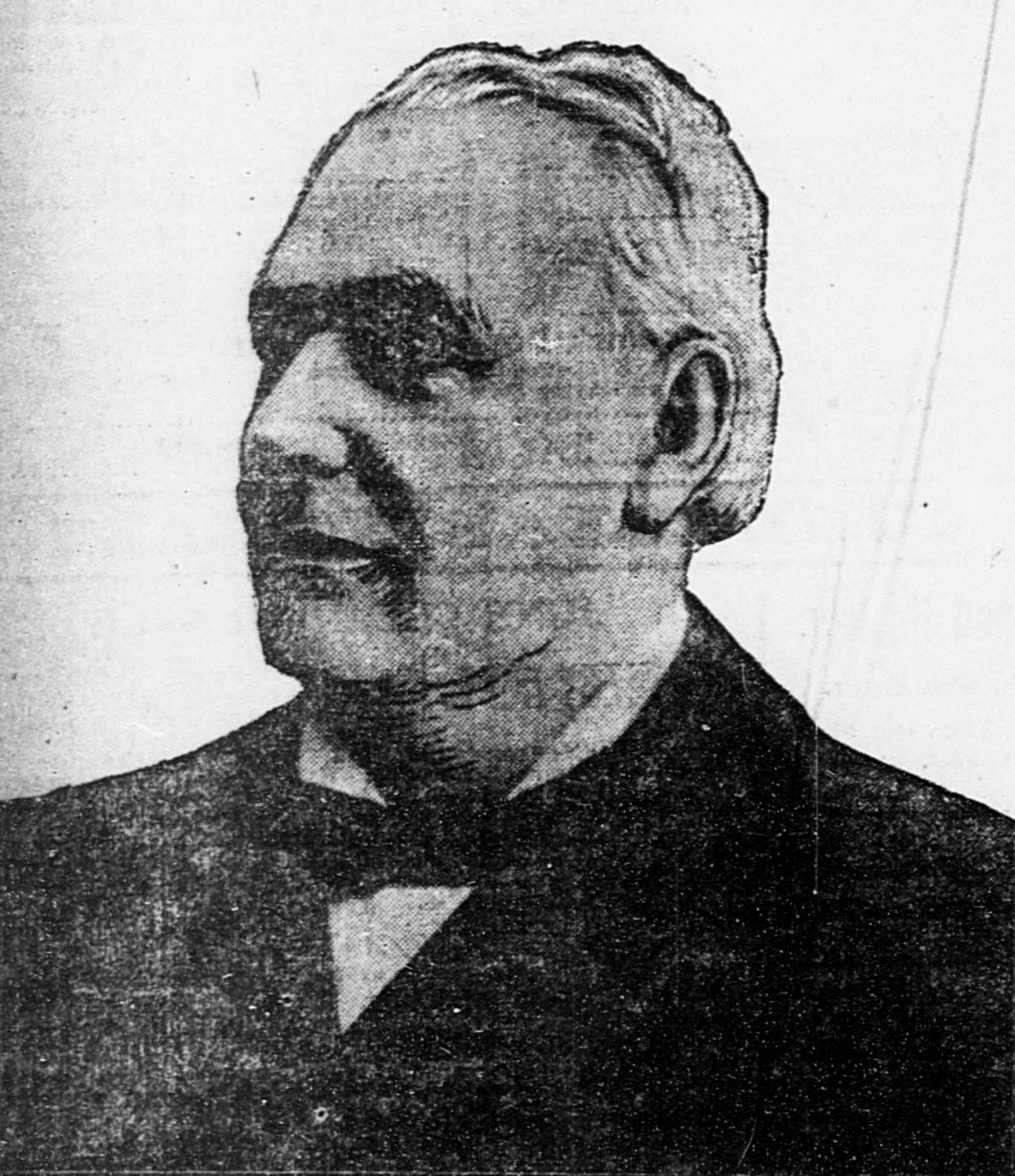
- in 1902

29th Mayor of St. Louis, Missouri
- In office April 10, 1897 – April 9, 1901
- Preceded by: Cyrus Walbridge
- Succeeded by: Rolla Wells

Personal details
- Born: c. 1845 St. Louis County, Missouri, US
- Died: March 17, 1910 St. Louis, Missouri, US
- Party: Republican

Henry Ziegenhein (c. 1845 – March 17, 1910) was the 29th mayor of St. Louis, Missouri, serving from 1897 to 1901.

== Childhood and young adulthood ==
Born on September 20, 1845, Ziegenhein was the son of farmer Peter Ziegenhein. Both his parents had emigrated from Germany to settle in the area, and were some of the first to do so. Until he turned thirteen years old, Ziegenhein lived at home, attending the nearby rural school and helping out on the farm with his brothers William and Henry Ziegenhein. However, in 1858, he moved to St. Louis City become an apprentice to a carpenter.

When Ziegenhein turned 17, the Civil War started, and so he served the Union Army. Upon his return to St. Louis afterwards, he began his own building and contracting business.

A few years later when Ziegenhein was twenty-four years old, he met and married Miss Catherine Henkle, with whom he had nine children.

== Political career ==
In his early thirties, Ziegenhein was a very active member of politics in the St. Louis region. From 1881 to 1885, he was a member of the City Council, and in the following years, he became a member of the Missouri State Legislature. At the end of the decade in 1889, Ziegenhein was elected to the City Collector office, and he was re-elected a few years later in 1893. Throughout this time period, Ziegenhein was rising in prestige and importance in the Republican Party of St. Louis City, resulting in his being recognized as one of the leaders of the party.

In the spring of 1897, Ziegenhein was elected to become the twenty-ninth Mayor of St. Louis. In his four-year term from 1897 to 1901, he was very active in the completion of the present City Hall and various other projects. Though various offices began being occupied in 1898, the building itself was not complete until 1904. In addition, Ziegenhein was approved by the Ordinance of 1900 to appoint a Factory Inspector who looked for violations in State Laws regarding sanitary conditions, number of hours worked, and restrictions on the special election on July 12, 1898.

In addition to his efforts in aiding the City Hall's construction, Ziegenhein authorized the start of construction on the City Hospital. Earlier in 1896, a giant tornado had excessively damaged the past one, requiring a whole new building to be built in its place.

Ziegenhein refused to wear a dress suit when he was invited to attend the Veiled Prophet Ball and "welcome" the Veiled Prophet to his city in 1898. He said he had never worn one and never would, preferring a Prince Albert coat, which he wore on all state occasions.

== Criticism ==
Despite these achievements, Ziegenhein also garnered accusations of corruption in Lincoln Steffens' muckraking exposé essay for McClure's Magazine, "Tweed Days In St. Louis. Steffens reported that

Mayor Ziegenhein, called "Uncle Henry," was a "good fellow," "one of the boys," and though it was during his administration that the city grew ripe and went to rot, his opponents talked only of incompetence and neglect, and repeated such stories as that of his famous reply to some citizens who complained because certain street lights were put out: "You have the moon yet—ain't it?"

== Post-political career ==
After stepping down from his position as Mayor in 1901, Ziegenhein became an active figure in planning the future for Lafayette Bank, where he was one of the largest stockholders.

On March 17, 1910, Ziegenhein died.

Political offices
| Preceded by Cyrus Walbridge | Mayor of St. Louis, Missouri; 1897–1901 | Succeeded by Rolla Wells |
