= Edward A. Noonan =

American politician

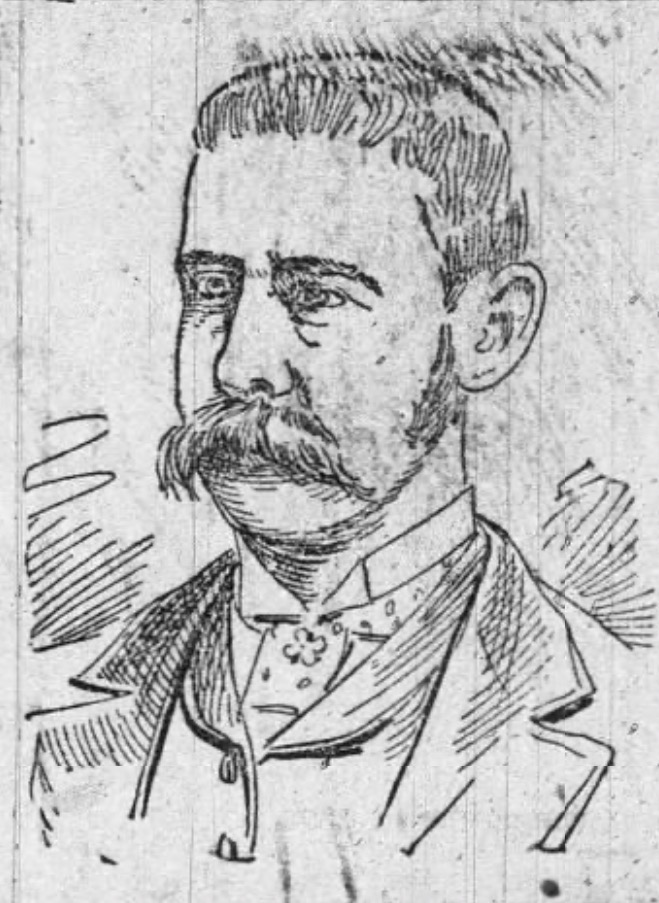

27th Mayor of St. Louis, Missouri
- In office April 6, 1889 – April 8, 1893
- Preceded by: David R. Francis
- Succeeded by: Cyrus Walbridge

Personal details
- Born: December 20, 1852 Reading, Pennsylvania, US
- Died: September 23, 1927 (aged 74) St. Louis, Missouri, US
- Party: Democratic

Edward A. Noonan (December 20, 1852 – September 23, 1927) was the 27th mayor of St. Louis, Missouri, US, serving from 1889 to 1893.

Political offices
Preceded by David R. Francis	Mayor of St. Louis, Missouri; 1889–1893	Succeeded by Cyrus Walbridge
