= Philippine E. Von Overstolz =

American musician and artist (1847–1925)

Philippine Espenschied Von Overstolz
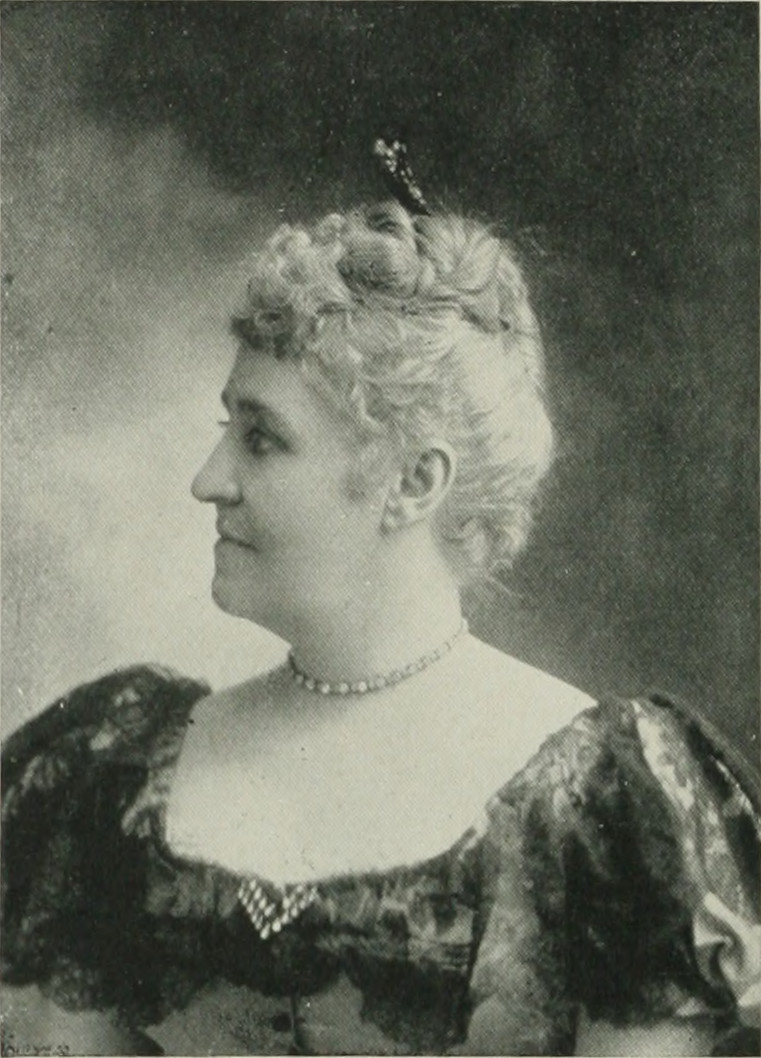

Background information
- Born: Philippine Espenschied; May 1, 1847; St. Louis, Missouri, U.S.
- Died: September 6, 1925 (aged 78)

Philippine Espenschied Von Overstolz (May 1, 1847 – September 6, 1925) was a musician, linguist and artist.

== Early life ==
Philippine Espenschied was born on May 1, 1847, in St. Louis, Missouri, the daughter of Louis Espenschied (1821–1887), a wagon-maker owner of Louis Espenschied Wagon Co., and Catherine Weber (1824–1887). She was of German-Spanish descent. Her father was one of the first settlers of St. Louis. Through the affluence of her highly-cultured parents she was enable to enjoy rare advantages of education and full development of the talent she possessed. In early childhood, she had a well-equipped art studio, and it was at the time the only private studio in St. Louis. At the age of eight years, she won medals and other premiums for pencil-drawings and several studies in oil, and she continued to win premiums offered to young artists until her thirteenth year, when a serious illness caused by the effects of oils prevented further paint work. She took up the study of vocal music. In instrumental music, she commanded a knowledge of harp, piano, organ, violin, mandolin and banjo, and her proficiency was marked. She had an aptitude for language, and in Germany she was pronounced an exceptional German scholar for one born and bred an American.

== Career ==
Her talent for modeling was evident, and without any instruction she achieved success. Busts of herself in bronze and marble were made by the distinguished sculptor, Frederick Ruckstull, and exhibited in the Paris Salon. Other were displayed at the World's Columbian Exposition in Chicago in 1893. In her husband, Henry Overstolz, Overstolz found help and encouragement in both art and literature. One of his legacies to her was a large library and a collection of paintings, valued at $100,000 ($100,000 in 1893 are $2,591,699.31 in 2017), which was widely exhibited in large fairs and expositions and requested for the World's Columbian Exposition in 1893.

She was a patron of arts and helped young artists like William Merritt Chase, William Henry Howe, Wiemer, Tracey, George Chambers (son), Joseph Rusling Meeker, Frederick Ruckstull.

Later in life, Overstolz undertook the study of medicine as an additional provision for herself and live children against possible adversity and graduated from a western medical college.

== Personal life ==
In 1875, Espenschied married Henry Clemens Overstolz (1822–1887), a member of the oldest living German family in the world, and twice mayor of St. Louis. The Overstolz ancestry was direct from the Roman family named Superbus, and whose home, "The Tempel-Haus," on the banks of the Rhine, No. 43 Rhein-Strasse, Cologne, Germany, was retained by the royal rulers of Germany. They had six children, including Charles Henry von Overstoltz (1880–1941), Ida von Overstoltz (1878–1961), Marie E. von Overstoltz, Catherine Philippine von Overstoltz, and Lucile Alice von Overstoltz Koeck (1876–1948).

In 1894, she remarried to Dr. Otto Edward Forster (1858–1920), an 1881 graduate of the Washington University Medical School. Forster was the son of Marquand Forster, a millionaire brewer. Despite being 11 years younger than her, Dr. Forster died in 1920, five years before his wife.

An anecdote says that she was the only young lady with whom President Ulysses Grant danced during his occupancy.

She died on September 6, 1925, and is buried with her first husband at Bellefontaine Cemetery, St. Louis, Missouri.
