= Nathan Cole =

American politician and businessman (1825–1904)

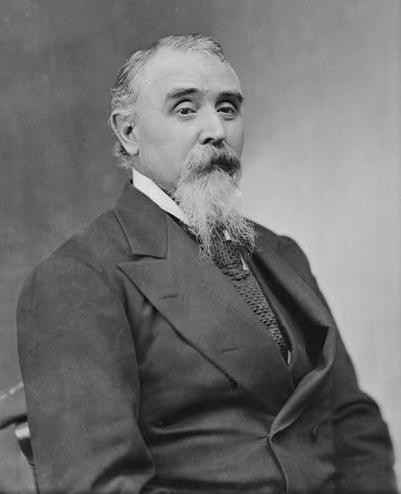
- Brady-Handy collection portrait of Cole, taken between 1865 and 1880

Member of the U.S. House of Representatives from Missouri's 2nd district
- In office March 4, 1877 – March 3, 1879
- Preceded by: Erastus Wells
- Succeeded by: Erastus Wells

Mayor of St. Louis
- In office 1869 – 1871
- Preceded by: James S. Thomas
- Succeeded by: Joseph Brown

Personal details
- Born: July 26, 1825 St. Louis, Missouri, US
- Died: March 4, 1904 (aged 78) St. Louis, Missouri, US
- Resting place: Bellefontaine Cemetery
- Party: Republican
- Education: Shurtleff College
- Occupation: Politician, businessman
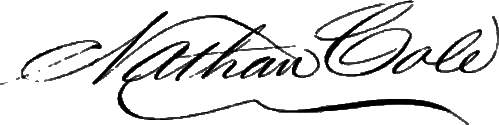
- Signature

Nathan Cole (July 26, 1825 – March 4, 1904) was an American politician and businessman. A Republican, he was the Mayor of St. Louis and a member of the United States House of Representatives from Missouri.

== Early life and education ==
Cole was born on July 26, 1825, in St. Louis. The son of Nathan Cole Sr., he descended from the settlers of Plymouth Colony. His father was born in New York, and due to lackluster transportation, walked 100 miles (160 km) from Cairo, Illinois, to St. Louis in his journey there. Cole was possibly the first person born in St. Louis after its incorporation as a city. Educated at common schools, he attended Shurtleff College; he later spent two years working for the college.

== Career ==
Beginning in 1843, Cole began work as a merchant in St. Louis. For 43 years, he was director of the St. Louis Bank of Commerce, spending a majority of that time as its vice-president. He headed other corporations, such as insurance companies. In 1876, he was president of the Merchants Exchange.

Cole was a Republican. From 1869 to 1871, he was the Mayor of St. Louis, and while in office, protected former Confederate States Army soldiers. He represented Missouri's 2nd district in the United States House of Representatives, serving from March 4, 1877, to March 3, 1879. He lost the following election. He was a delegate to etiher the 1892 ot 1896 Republican National Convention.

After serving in Congress, Cole returned to working as a businessman. He retired c. 1889.

== Personal life and death ==
He was a Baptist, being baptized in Wood River, Illinois. On January 30, 1851, he married Rebecca Lane Fagin; they had eleven children together, including Nathan Cole Jr., a founder of the Los Angeles Times. His net worth was estimated at $750,000. He died on March 4, 1904, aged 78, in St. Louis, from apoplexy. His last words were "this is my end. I am gone", which he said while falling into his servant's arms. He was buried at Bellefontaine Cemetery.

Political offices
Preceded by James S. Thomas	Mayor of St. Louis, Missouri; 1869 – 1871	Succeeded by Joseph Brown
U.S. House of Representatives
Preceded by Erastus Wells	Member of the U.S. House of Representatives from Missouri's 2nd congressional district March 4, 1877 – March 3, 1879	Succeeded by Erastus Wells
