= James H. Britton =

American politician (1817–1900)

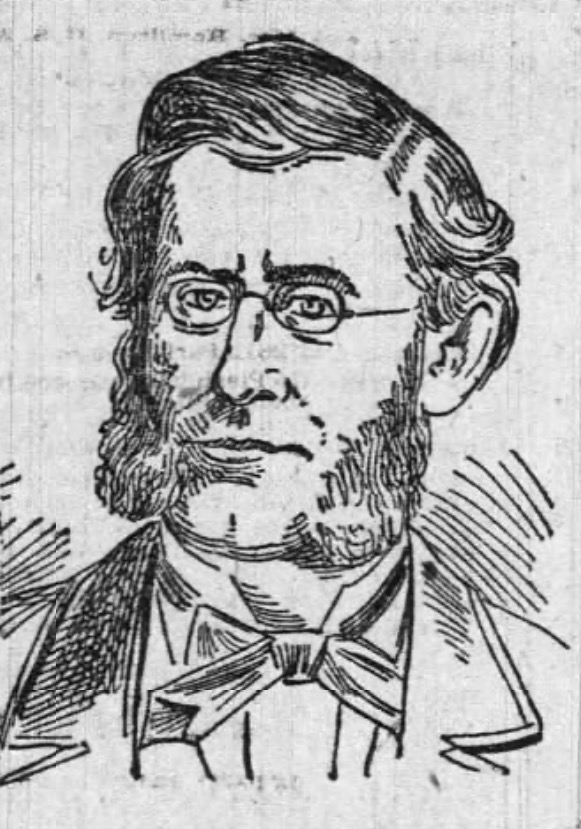

23rd Mayor of St. Louis, Missouri
- In office May 29, 1875 – February 9, 1876
- Preceded by: Arthur Barret
- Succeeded by: Henry Overstolz

Personal details
- Born: July 11, 1817 Shenandoah County, Virginia, US
- Died: January 27, 1900 (aged 82) Ardsley, New York, US
- Party: Democratic

James H. Britton (July 11, 1817 – January 27, 1900) was the 23rd mayor of St. Louis, Missouri.

== Biography ==
Britton was born in Shenandoah County, Virginia, on July 11, 1817. In 1840, Britton moved to Troy, Missouri, where he opened a general store. He first became involved in Missouri politics when he became Secretary of the Senate of the Missouri Legislature in 1848. Between 1852 and 1856, he served as a representative of Lincoln County in the State Legislature. Afterwards, he took the position of Chief Clerk of the Missouri House of Representatives. He would later serve as the Treasurer of Lincoln County and Postmaster of Troy.

Britton moved to St. Louis in 1857 and took a job as a cashier at Southern Bank and, seven years later, became the bank's president. A few years later, Britton was named president of the National Bank of the State of Missouri.

Following mayor Arthur Barret's sudden death in 1875, Britton ran for mayor and was nominated by the Democratic party on May 10, 1875. In the special mayoral election held five days later on May 15, Britton defeated his opponent Henry Overstolz. However, two days later, Overstolz decided to contest the election alleging ballot stuffing amongst other things. Several months later, the ballots were recounted and on February 9, 1876, Britton was unseated and Overstolz was declared mayor. Britton had lost by 77 votes out of more than 29,000 votes cast.

During the nine months that Britton served as mayor, many sewer districts were created and building inspections were mandated for new construction.

Britton died January 27, 1900, in Ardsley, New York.

Political offices
Preceded by Arthur Barret	Mayor of St. Louis, Missouri; 1875–1876	Succeeded by Henry Overstolz
