= Arthur Barret =

American politician

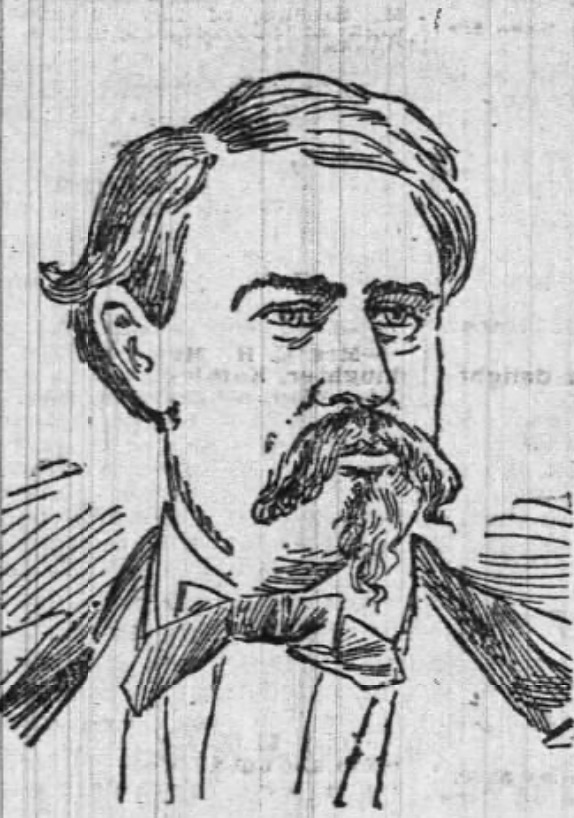

22nd Mayor of St. Louis, Missouri
- In office April 13, 1875 – April 24, 1875
- Preceded by: Joseph Brown
- Succeeded by: James H. Britton

Personal details
- Born: August 23, 1836 Springfield, Illinois, US
- Died: April 24, 1875 (aged 38) St. Louis, Missouri, US
- Party: Democratic
- Spouse: Anna F. Barret

Arthur B. Barret (August 23, 1836 – April 24, 1875) was the 22nd mayor of St. Louis, Missouri, but died of an illness only 11 days after taking office.

Barret was born on his family farm in Sangamon County, Illinois, near the state capital of Springfield. He was educated at various private schools including Phillips Academy and Saint Louis University. As he reached adulthood, he moved to a farm across the Missouri River from Hermann, Missouri, to raise cattle. A few years later, he moved to St. Louis where he met and married his wife, Miss Anna F. Swerengen, in June 1859 with whom he had three children. Shortly after the American Civil War, Barret succeeded his cousin, Colonel J. Richard Barret, to become president of the St. Louis Agricultural and Mechanical Association, a group that organized many large fairs held on the lands that would become Fairground Park in St. Louis. He resigned from the post in 1874.

He was a candidate for mayor several times before the St. Louis Democratic Convention: he was defeated three times in 1869, 1871, and 1873, the latter two which he was defeated by 3 votes and 1 vote, respectively. Finally, in 1875, Barret was nominated by the Democratic Convention without any opposition. On April 6, he was elected mayor of St. Louis having defeated Henry Overstolz with a large majority of the vote.

Barret was inaugurated as mayor of St. Louis on April 13, 1875. Four days later, he fell severely ill. The illness proved fatal and he died on April 24, 1875, having served only 11 days as mayor.

Preceded by Joseph Brown	Mayor of St. Louis, Missouri; 1875	Succeeded by James H. Britton
