= 1888 Missouri gubernatorial election =

- November 6, 1888
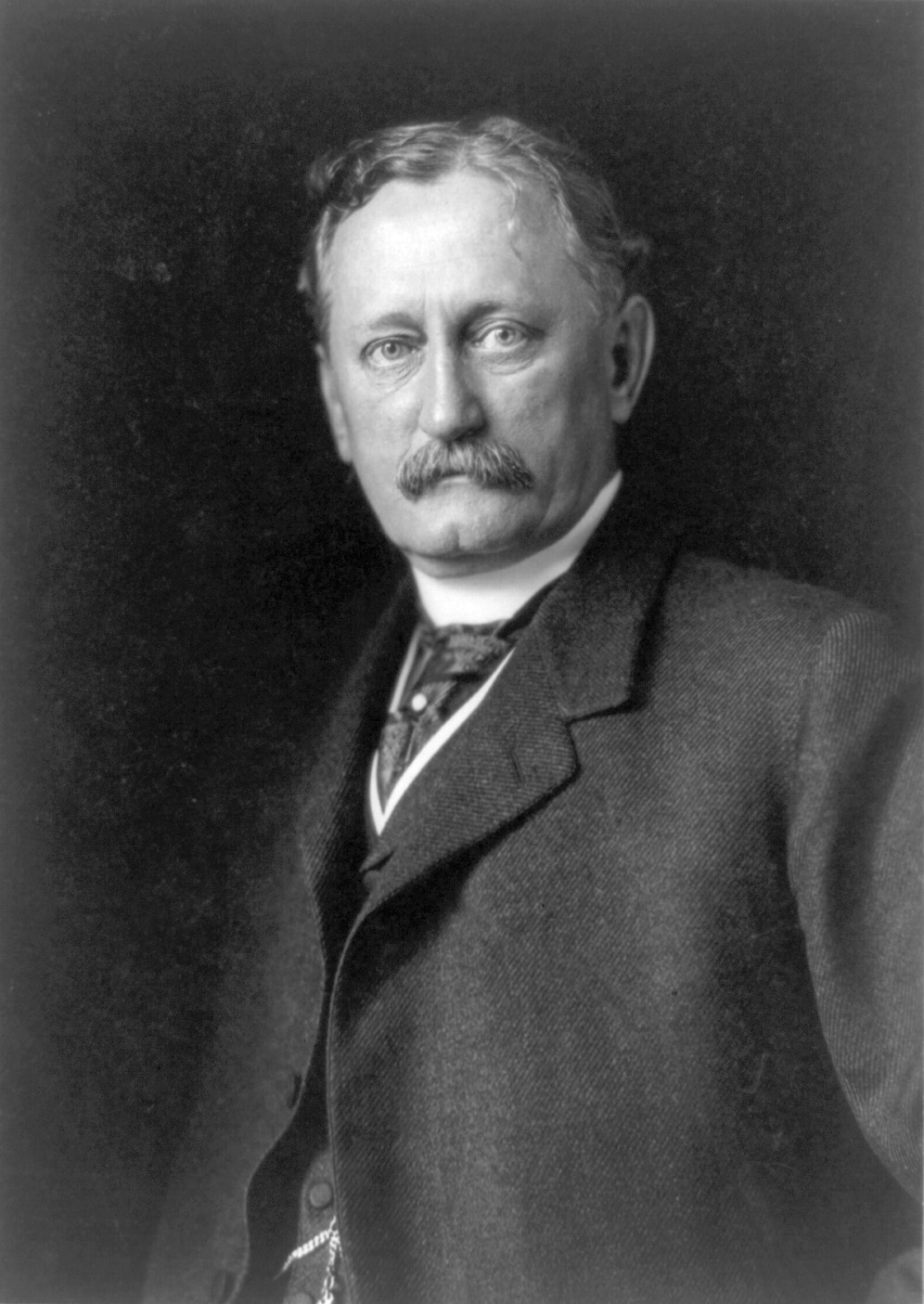

Nominee	David R. Francis	Elbert Kimball
Party	Democratic	Republican
Popular vote	255,764	242,531
Percentage	49.36%	46.81%
- County results Francis: 40–50% 50–60% 60–70% 70–80% Kimball: 40–50% 50–60% 60–70% 70–80% Tie: 40–50%
Governor before election
Albert P. Morehouse
Democratic
Elected Governor
David R. Francis
Democratic

The 1888 Missouri gubernatorial election was held on November 6, 1888, and resulted in a victory for the Democratic nominee, Mayor of St. Louis David R. Francis, over the Republican candidate Elbert E. Kimball, Union Labor candidate Ahira Manring, and Prohibition candidate Frank M. Lowe.

== Results ==
1888 gubernatorial election, Missouri
Party	Candidate	Votes	%	±%
Democratic	David R. Francis	255,764	49.36	−0.69
Republican	Elbert E. Kimball	242,531	46.81	−0.74
Union Labor Party	Ahira Manring	15,438	2.98	+2.98
Prohibition	Frank M. Lowe	4,389	0.85	+0.85
Majority		13,233	2.55	+0.05
Turnout		518,122	23.89	
Democratic hold		Swing		
