= 1904 Missouri gubernatorial election =

- November 8, 1904
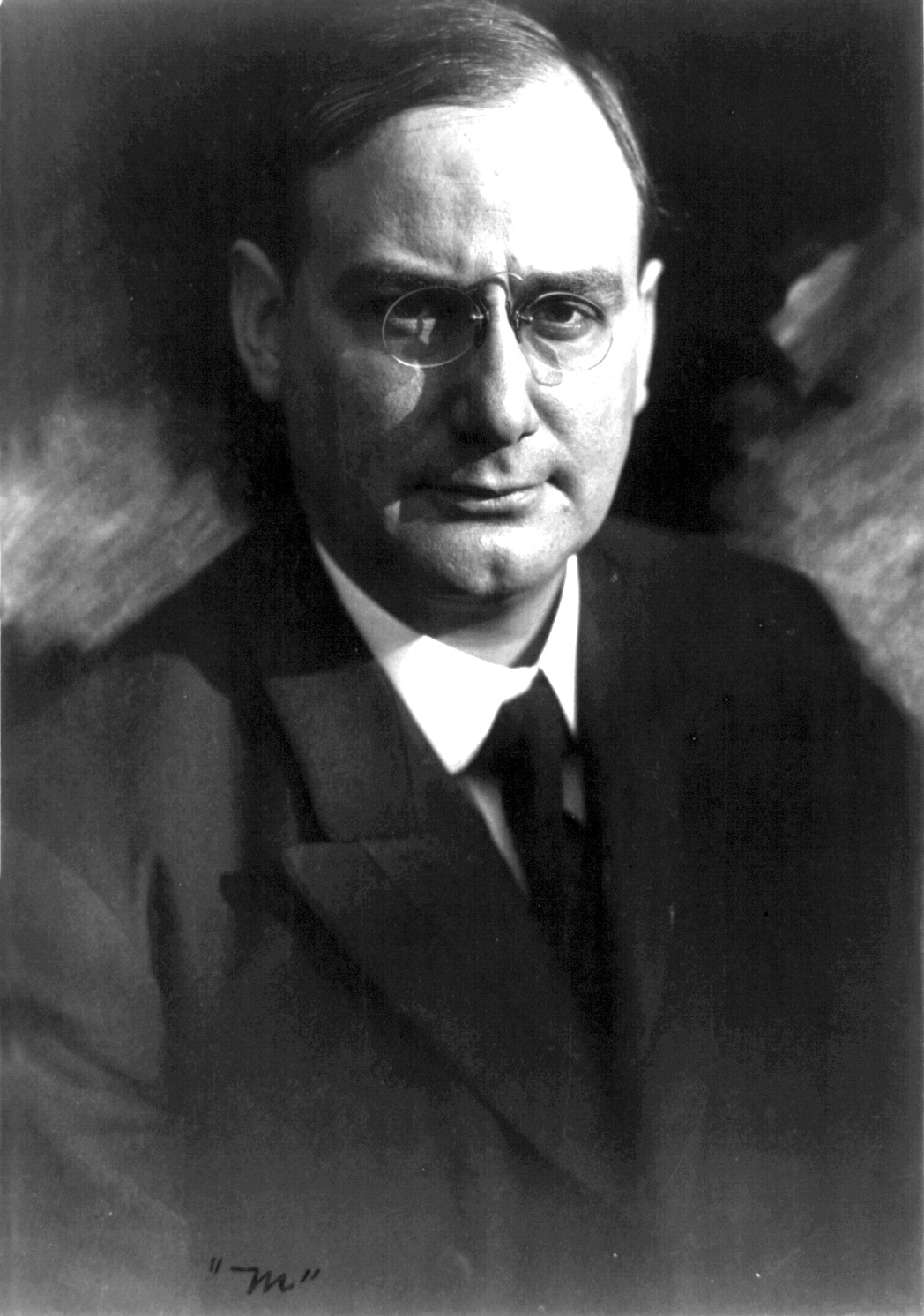

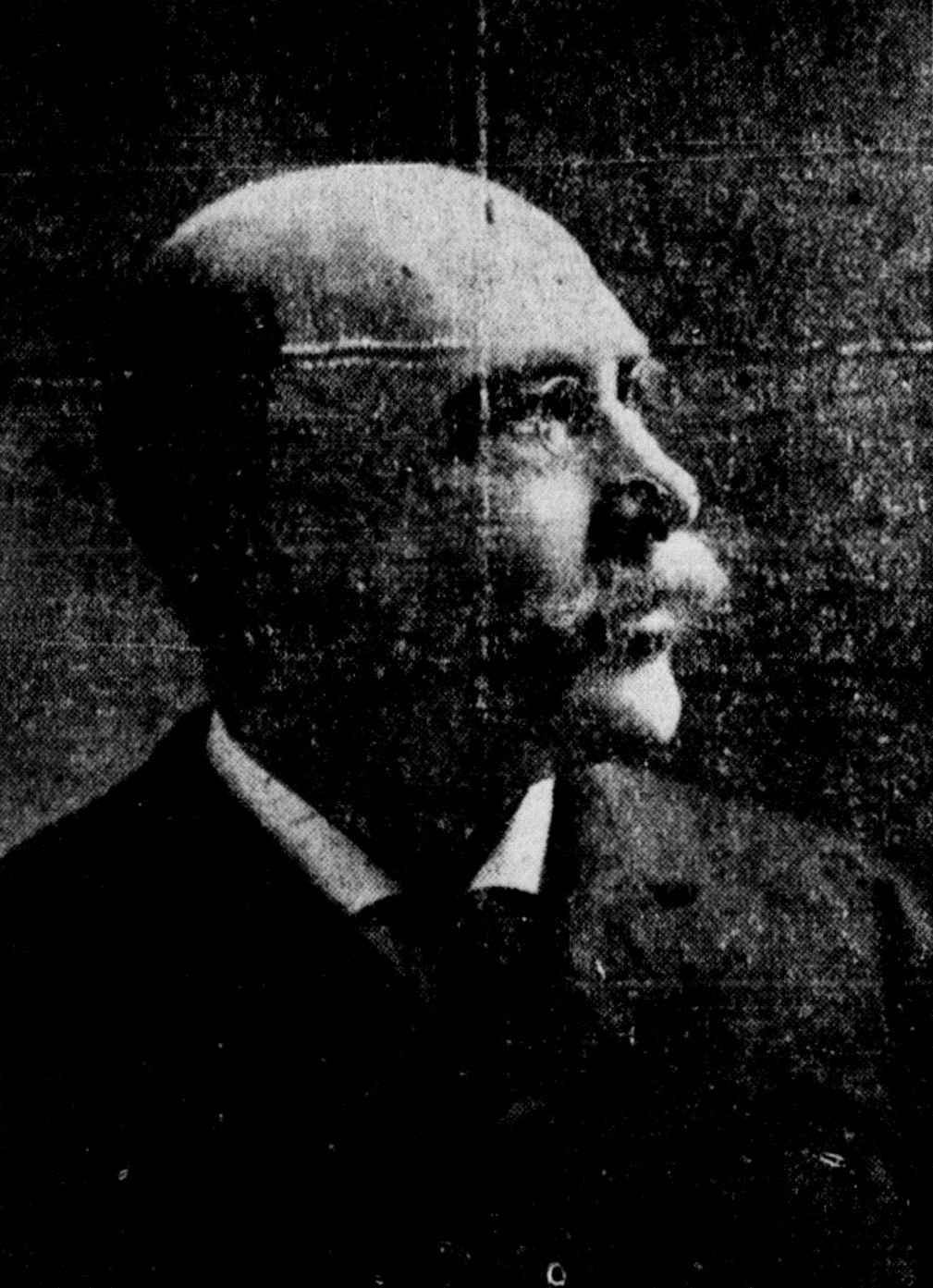
Nominee	Joseph W. Folk	Cyrus Walbridge
Party	Democratic	Republican
Popular vote	326,652	296,552
Percentage	50.73%	46.05%
- County results Folk: 40–50% 50–60% 60–70% 70–80% 80–90% Walbridge: 40–50% 50–60% 60–70% 70–80%
Governor before election
Alexander Monroe Dockery
Democratic
Elected Governor
Joseph W. Folk
Democratic

The 1904 Missouri gubernatorial election was held on November 8, 1904, and resulted in a victory for the Democratic nominee, Joseph W. Folk, over the Republican candidate, former mayor of St. Louis Cyrus Walbridge, and several other candidates representing minor parties. Folk defeated Harry B. Hawes and Kansas City mayor James A. Reed for the Democratic nomination.

== Results ==
1904 gubernatorial election, Missouri
Party	Candidate	Votes	%	±%
Democratic	Joseph W. Folk	326,652	50.73	−0.42
Republican	Cyrus Walbridge	296,552	46.05	−0.41
Socialist	Ernest T. Behrens	11,031	1.71	+1.71
Prohibition	Orange J. Hill	5,591	0.87	+0.11
Populist	William C. Alldredge	2,701	0.42	+0.42
Socialist Labor	J. E. White	1,442	0.22	+0.04
Majority		30,100	4.67	−0.03
Turnout		643,969	20.73	
Democratic hold		Swing		
