= Slayback =

Slayback is a surname. Notable people with the surname include:

- Alonzo W. Slayback (1838-1882), a St. Louis, Missouri, lawyer and Confederate Army officer
- Charles E. Slayback (1840-1924), a grain merchant in Louisiana and Missouri

== See also ==
- Slayback (comic book character)
- Slayback's Missouri Cavalry Regiment
