= Lalla Rookh =

1817 poem by Thomas Moore

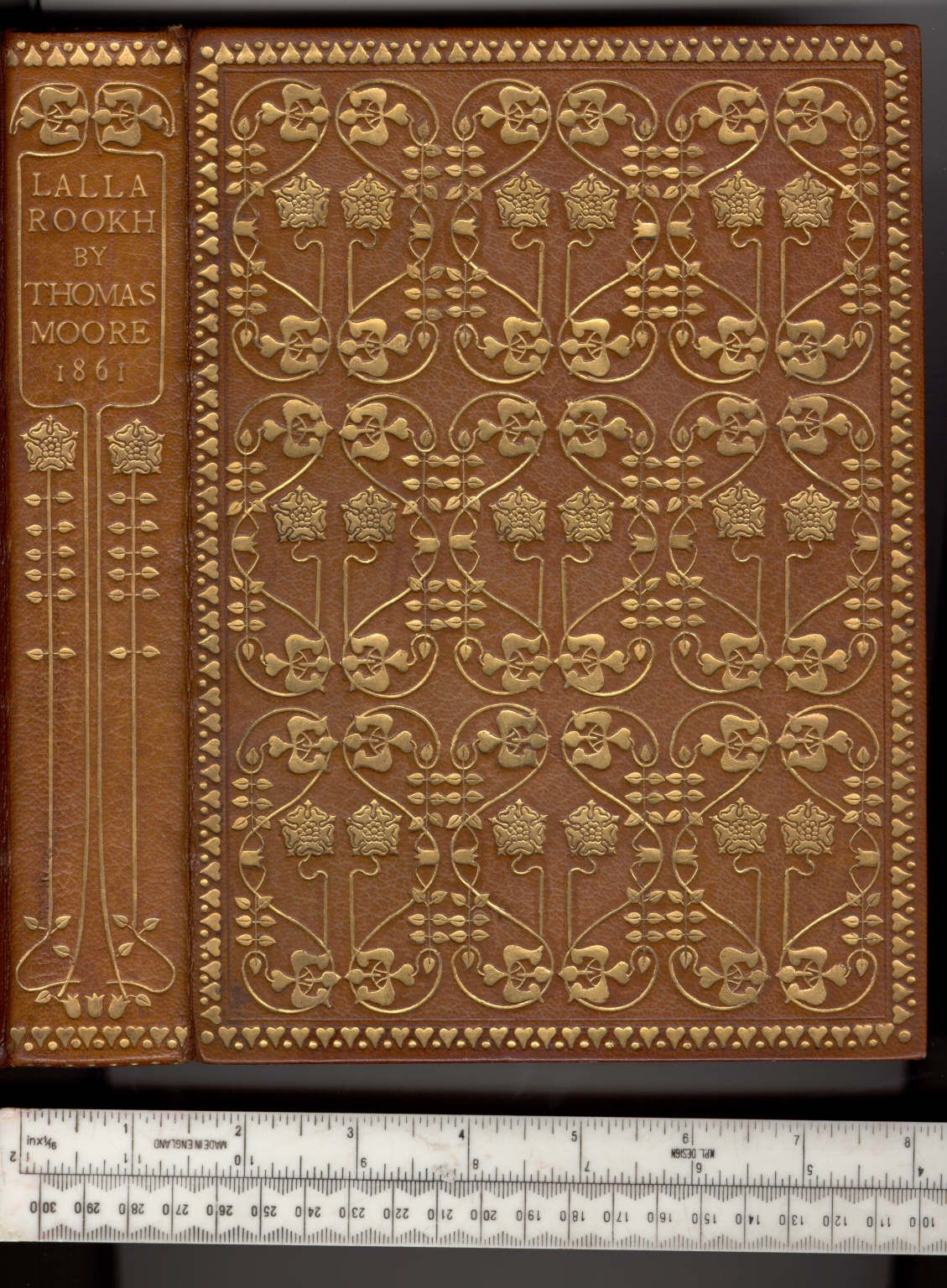
- The 1861 edition
- Author: Thomas Moore
- Publication date: 1817

Lalla Rookh is a romantic work by Irish poet Thomas Moore, first published in 1817. The title refers to the fictional heroine of the frame tale, depicted as the daughter of the 17th-century Mughal emperor Aurangzeb. It consists of four narrative poems with a connecting tale in prose. The work was a resounding success, and its popularity gave rise to many ships being named "Lalla Rookh" during the 19th century. It also played an instrumental role in making Kashmir (called Cashmere in the poem) a household name in the English-speaking world. The poem remains one of the great works of orientalist poetry and has been regularly adapted into films, musicals, operas, and other media.

== Name and background ==
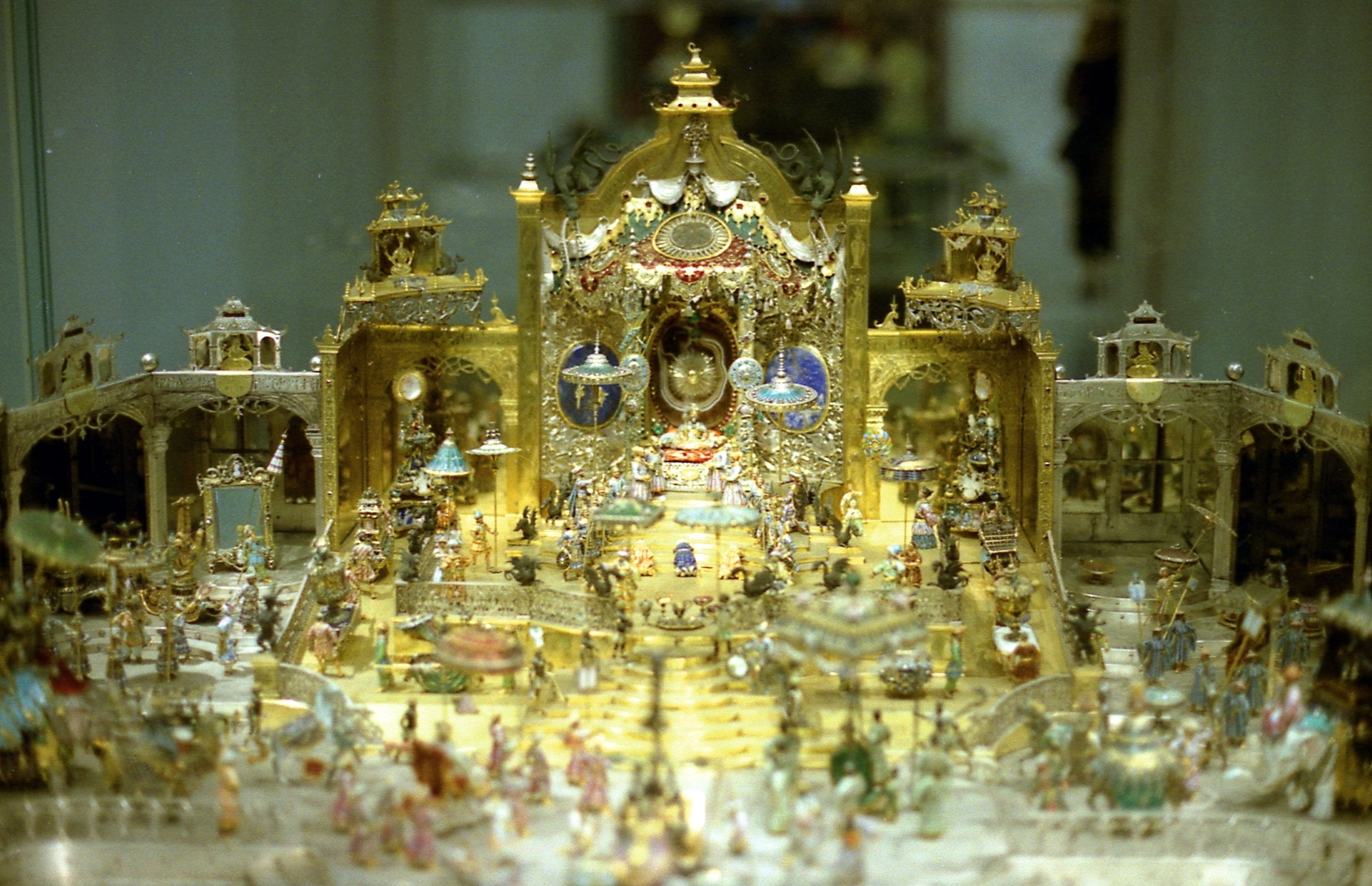
Diorama of the Mughal imperial palace at Delhi (1701–1708), made by Johann Melchior Dinglinger

The name Lalla Rookh or Lala-Rukh (Persian: لاله رخ laleh rox or rukh) means "tulip-cheeked" and is an endearment frequently used in Persian poetry. Lalla Rookh has also been translated as "rosy-cheeked"; however, the first word derives from the Persian word for tulip, laleh, and a different word, laal, means rosy, or ruby. Tulips were first cultivated in Persia, probably in the 10th century, and remain a powerful symbol in Iranian culture, and the name Laleh is a popular girl's name. Rukh also translates as "face".

Moore is believed to have drawn inspiration from The Garden of Knowledge by Inayatullah Kamboh (1608–1671). He set his poem in a sumptuous oriental setting on the advice of Lord Byron. The work was completed in 1817 while Moore was living in a house in the countryside of Hornsey, Middlesex, and the house was renamed, possibly by Moore himself, after the poem. Lalla Rookh is a fictional daughter of Emperor Aurangzeb; he had no daughter of this name.

== Overview ==
The plot is framed by a romantic narrative featuring the princess's journey and encounters. The aged King of Bukhara abdicated in favour of his son, which caused an Indian ruler to arrange a marriage between his daughter Lalla Rookh and the new ruler. Lalla Rookh travels to meet her betrothed, but falls in love with Feramorz, a poet posing as a humble singer in her entourage. Feramorz charms the princess with his ability to compose poetry. The bulk of the work consists of four interpolated tales sung by the poet: "The Veiled Prophet of Khorassan" (loosely based upon the story of Al-Muqanna), "Paradise and the Peri", "The Fire-Worshippers", and "The Light of the Harem". When Lalla Rookh enters the palace of her bridegroom, she swoons away, expecting to do her duty in marrying a man she has never met. She awakens with rapture to find that the poet she loves is there. The king had disguised himself as a slave to test whether his bride-to-be loved him for who he truly was.

== Allegorical meaning ==
Scholars have stated Moore, a friend of the executed Irish rebel Robert Emmet, depicts in the poem "disguised versions of the French Revolution and the Irish Rebellion of 1798, [and] condemns the former but justifies the latter".

== Adaptations ==
Lalla Rookh inspired several musical settings, including a cantata by Frederic Clay & W. G. Wills (1877) featuring the famous song "I'll Sing Thee Songs of Araby".

The Fire-Worshippers is an 1892 "dramatic cantata" by Granville Bantock based on one of the tales, and Bantock also wrote a 6-part adaptation of the whole poem for piano solo in 1919.

It is also the basis of the operas Lalla-Rûkh, festival pageant (1821) by Gaspare Spontini, partly reworked into Nurmahal oder das Rosenfest von Caschmir (1822), Lalla-Roukh by Félicien David (1862), Feramors by Anton Rubinstein (1863), and The Veiled Prophet by Charles Villiers Stanford (1879). One of the interpolated tales, Paradise and the Peri, was set as a choral-orchestral work by Robert Schumann (1843). Lines from the poem form the lyrics of the song "Bendemeer Stream".

The poem was translated into German in 1846 as Laleh-Rukh. Eine romantische Dichtung aus dem Morgenlande, by Anton Edmund Wollheim da Fonseca, was possibly the most translated poem of its time.

Lala Rookh, a 1958 Indian Hindi-language romantic-drama film by Akhtar Siraj, was based on Moore's poem.

== Legacy ==
The poem, which earned the highest price ever thus far for a poem (£3,000), enhanced Moore's reputation considerably at the time.

The popularity of the poem and its subsequent adaptations gave rise to many ships being named Lalla Rookh during the 19th century.

Alfred Joseph Woolmer painted "Lalla Rookh" in 1861, depicting Hinda, daughter of the Emir of Arabia, in a tower overlooking the Persian Gulf, based on the story called "The Fire-Worshippers" in the poem. It is now housed in the Leicester Museum & Art Gallery.

It is also credited with having made Kashmir (spelt Cashmere in the poem) "a household term in Anglophone societies", conveying the idea that it was a kind of paradise (an old idea going back to Hindu and Buddhist texts in Sanskrit.

The Mystic Order of Veiled Prophets of the Enchanted Realm (founded 1889), often known as "the Grotto", a social group with membership restricted to Master Masons, and its female auxiliary, the Daughters of Mokanna (founded 1919), also take their names from Thomas Moore's poem.

The Veiled Prophet Organization of St. Louis, Missouri, founded in 1878 by Charles and Alonzo Slayback created a mythology for a secret society and borrowed the name "The Veiled Prophet of Khorassan".

A tomb in Hassanabdal, Pakistan, dating from the Mughal Empire, is known as the tomb of Princess Lalarukh. Some historians and others say that there is a woman called Lalarukh from the household of Emperor Humayun buried here after dying on a journey from Kashmir, while others claim that she was the daughter of Emperor Aurangzeb. The tomb was first recorded as the Tomb of Lady Lalarukh in 1905, which historians suggest was derived from Moore's popular work and named by British officers in the time of British India.

In George Eliot's 1871/1872 novel Middlemarch, it is said of the character Rosamond Vincy, "Her favourite poem was 'Lalla Rookh'" (Chapter 16).
