= George Soulie =

George Albert Raoul Soulie, known as George Soulie (1844-1919) was a French-born artist living and working in New Orleans, Louisiana, and St. Louis, Missouri.

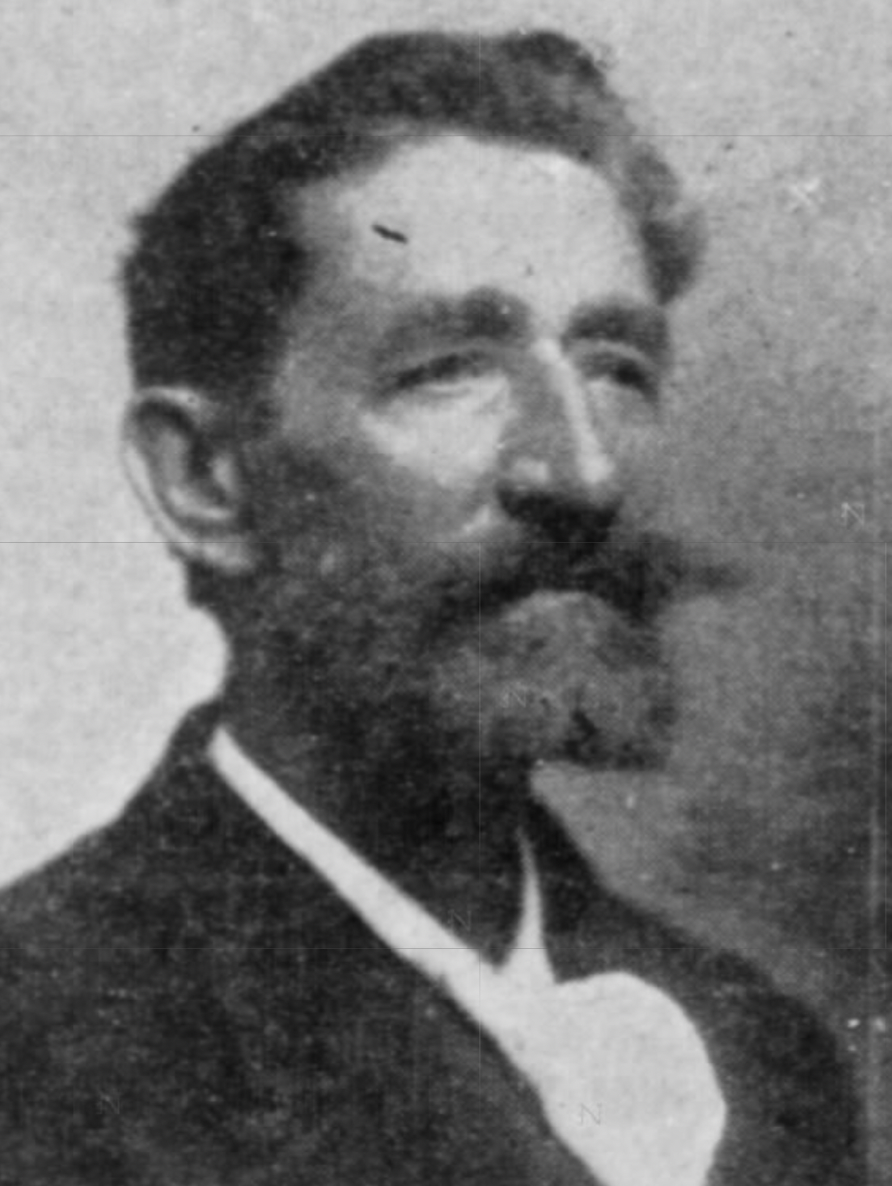
George Soulie

== Personal ==
He was born in December 1844 in Paris, Ile-de-France. He married Ernestine Dupaquier in Paris on January 4, 1868, to whom was born one son. He then was wed to Louise Broulet in 1872, and they had two children. He died on September 15, 1919, at the age of 74.

== Education and work ==
Soulie learned the profession of sculptor and painter in Paris, then served in the army during the Franco-Prussian War of 1870, after which he emigrated to New Orleans. There he established an atelier, or workshop, where he first devoted his time to making ornaments and models in papier-maché for the floats in Mardi Gras parades. Later he built a complete parade from a superstructure of woodwork and papier-maché, executed by the same set of workmen, under one superintendent. He remained the sole contractor and builder for thirty years.

George R. Larriue wrote for the New Orleans Times-Democrat that:

For seven or eight months preceding the Carnival Mr. Soulie has a force of from thirty to thirty-five people constantly at work putting up the woodwork, making flowers, decorations, signs, floats and arranging and executing the details that go toward the construction of a scene car or float. His plant is complete . . . But it is also . . . private.

He and his son, Henry Soulé, now his assistant, would draw the plans, and the father would make models in clay, "the figures of horses, lions, dogs or other animals, as well as birds, statuary, dragons and other ornaments and fixtures."

He then cast plaster models which were "given over to a corps of ladies for the purpose of stamping the molds with papier-maché," and, when dried, the "molds are removed and the figure is complete and ready to be mounted on the wooden frame," then "decorated in keeping with the original design or drawing."

Soulie did this kind of work in New Orleans for more than three decades, Larriue wrote, modeling "every figure" on from 70 to 75 floats every year.

In 1879 he also proposed to do similar work for the Veiled Prophet Parade in St. Louis, Missouri., and he signed a contract "to paint, decorate, and fix up generally in first-class style twenty-one chariots, or floats" for $630. He worked for three weeks, then was discharged by Superintendent Daniel E. Carroll.

Because the St. Louis Prophets were supposed to be nameless, "every effort" was made to keep the matter quiet, but Soulie filed suit against John G. Priest, president; Frank Galennie, secretary; Daniel Carrol, superintendent; Charles E. Slayback and Preston T. Slayback. The St. Louis Daily Globe Democrat reported that after "the indignant artist threatened to reveal all he knew concerning the Prophets and their identity," a "consultation of the high-muck-a-mucks of the V.P.'s was held," they offered $200, Soulie withdrew the suit, "the bounced artist promised to remain true to his plighted word not to squeal, and the awful mystery which surrounds to Prophets" remained "as impenetrable as before."
