= Alfred Woolmer =

British painter (1805–1892)

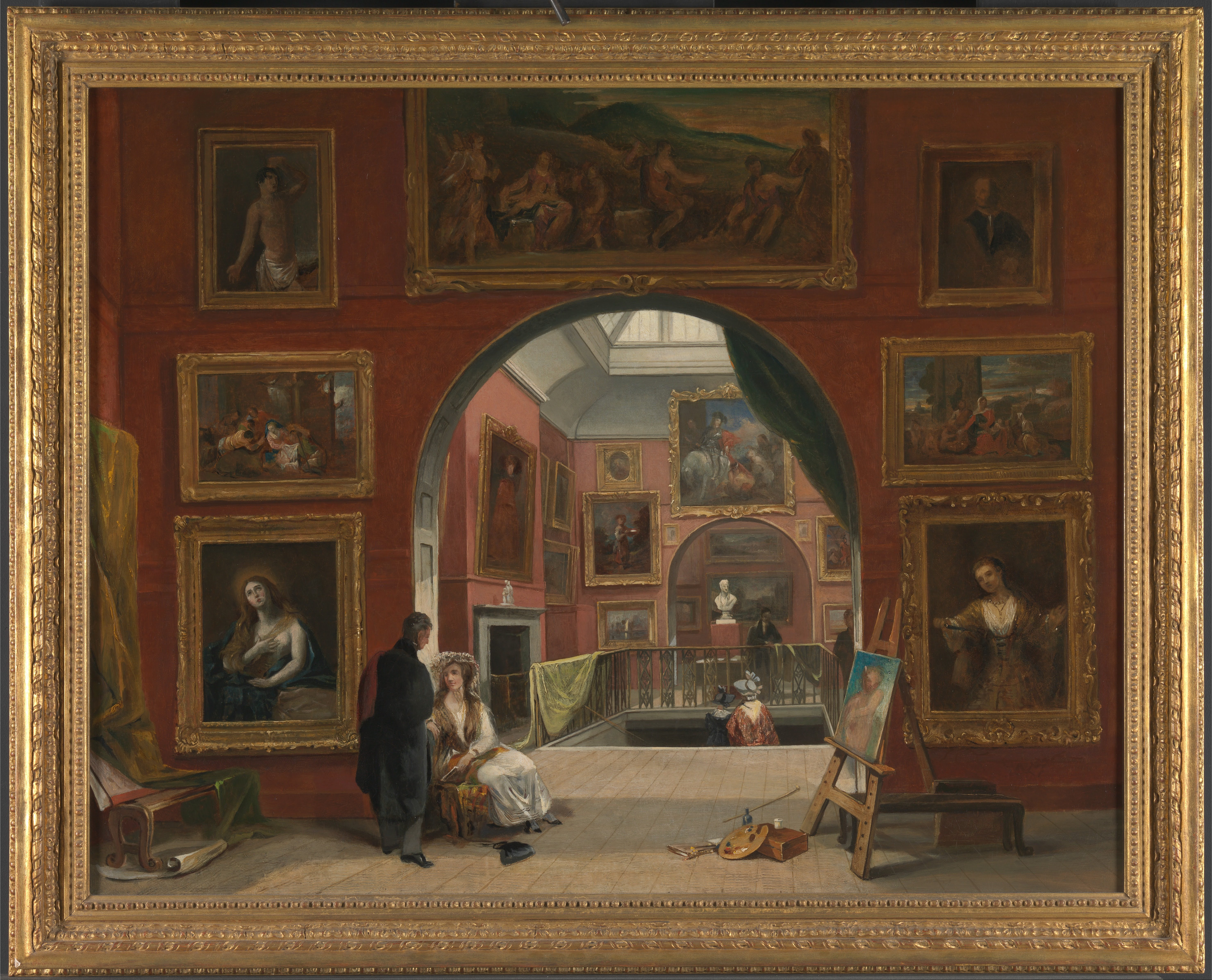
Interior of the British Institution (Old Master Exhibition, Summer 1832), by Alfred Joseph Woolmer (Yale Center for British Art)

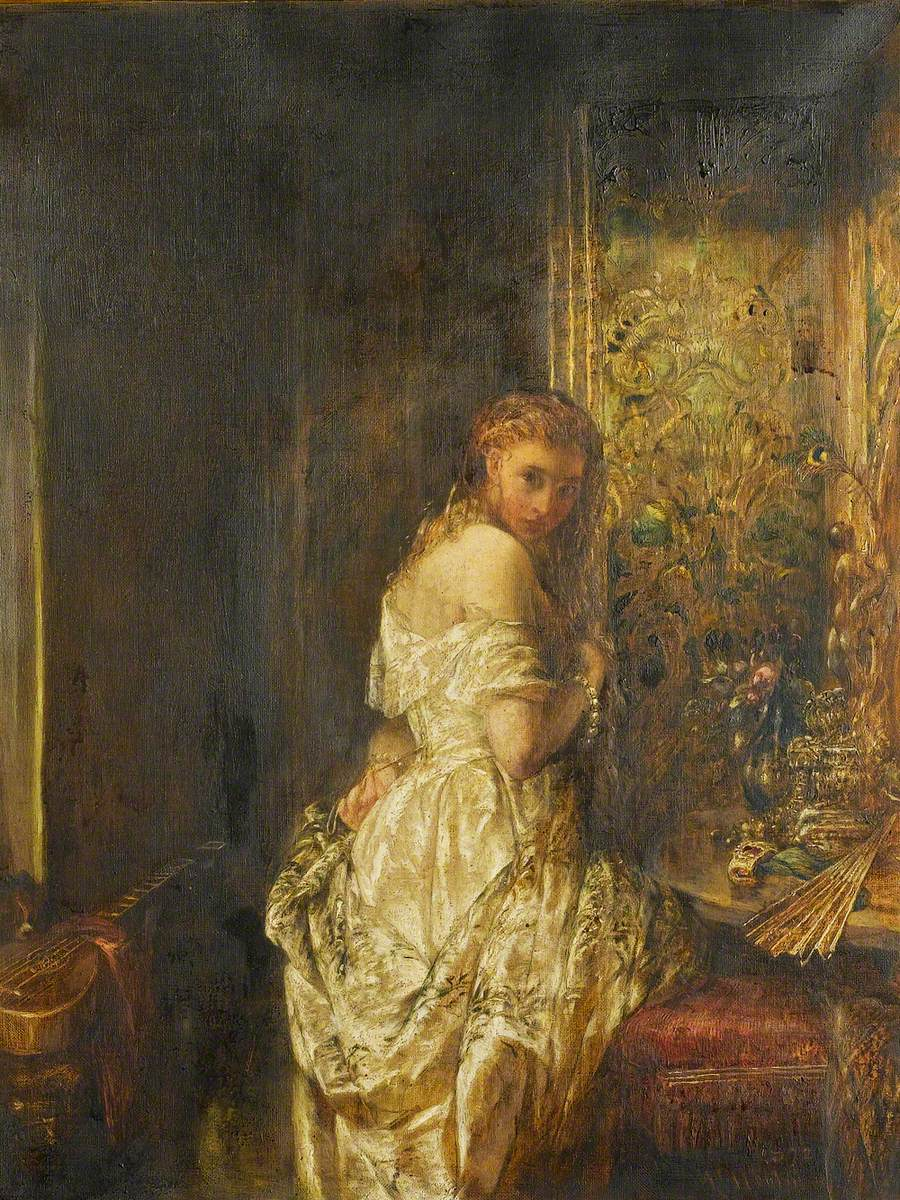
Woman in White (1872) by Alfred Joseph Woolmer (Herbert Art Gallery and Museum)

Alfred Joseph Woolmer (1805–1892) was an English painter whose subject matter covered the literary and historical genre. He was exceptionally prolific and, by age sixty, the number of works he had exhibited had reached 355 at the Society of British Artists, 45 at the British Institution, and 12 at the Royal Academy.

Woolmer started contributing to exhibitions in 1828. In 1848 he was elected to the Society of British Artists and in the following decade would exhibit between ten and sixteen pictures each year with the society.

His paintings, often mildly erotic, portray the concept of "ut pictura poesis". Marina Warner described his Lady Godiva, displayed at the Herbert Art Gallery and Museum in Coventry, as "sumptuous."

"Lalla Rookh" (1861), is based on the hugely popular 19th-century poem by Irish poet Thomas Moore, Lalla Rookh (1817). The painting depicts Hinda, daughter of the Emir of Arabia, in a tower overlooking the Persian Gulf, based on the story called "The Fire-Worshippers" in the poem. The painting is now housed in the Leicester Museum & Art Gallery.
