= Alonzo W. Slayback =

American lawyer (1838–1882)

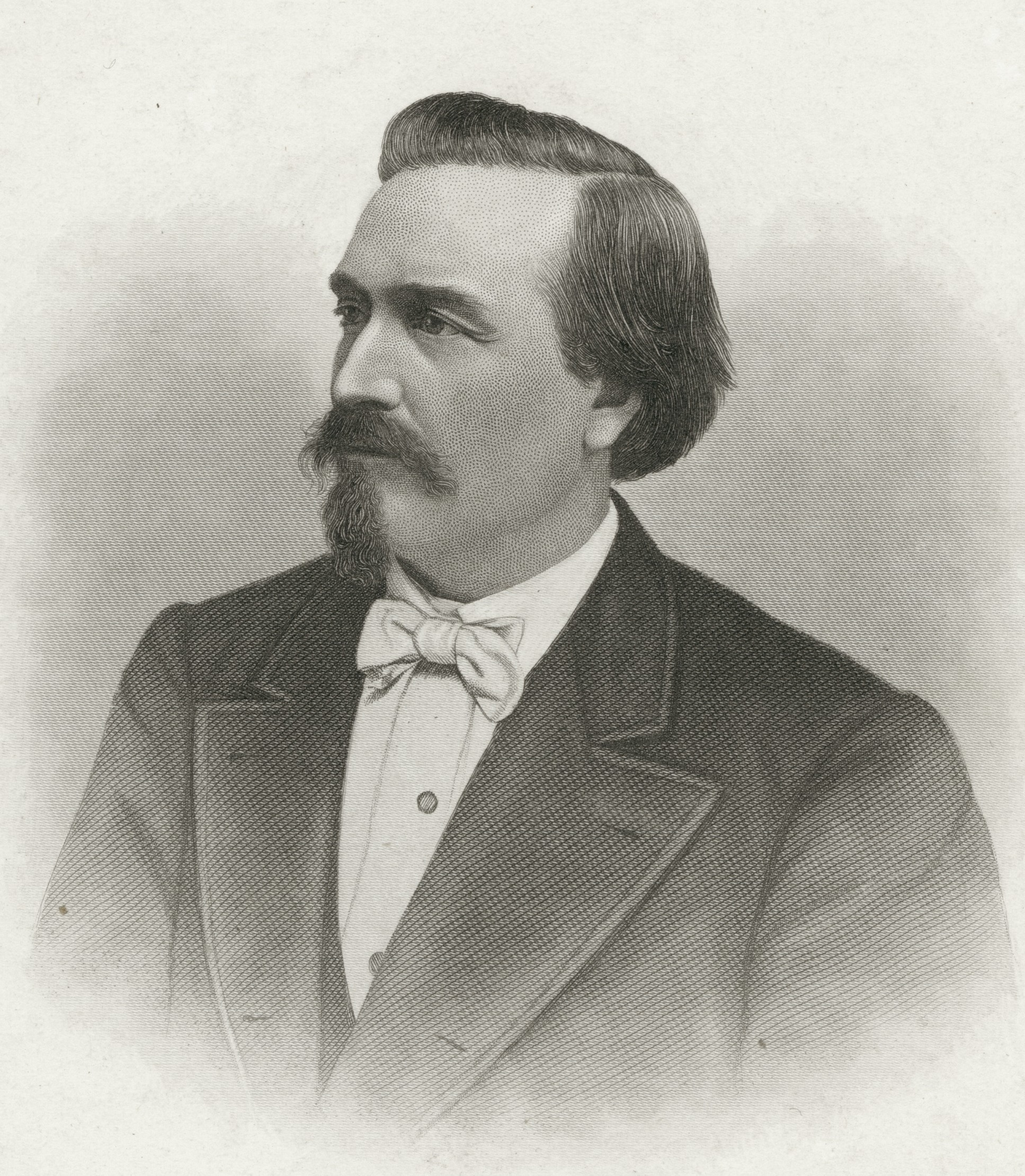
- Born: Alonzo William Slayback; July 4, 1838; Marion County, Missouri, U.S.
- Died: October 13, 1882 (aged 44); St. Louis, Missouri, U.S.
- Burial place: Bellefontaine Cemetery; St. Louis, Missouri
- Education: Masonic College
- Spouse: Alice Waddell
- Children: 6
- Military career
- Allegiance: Confederate States
- Branch: Confederate States Army (CSA)
- Service years: 1861–1865
- Commands: Slayback's Missouri Cavalry Regiment

Signature
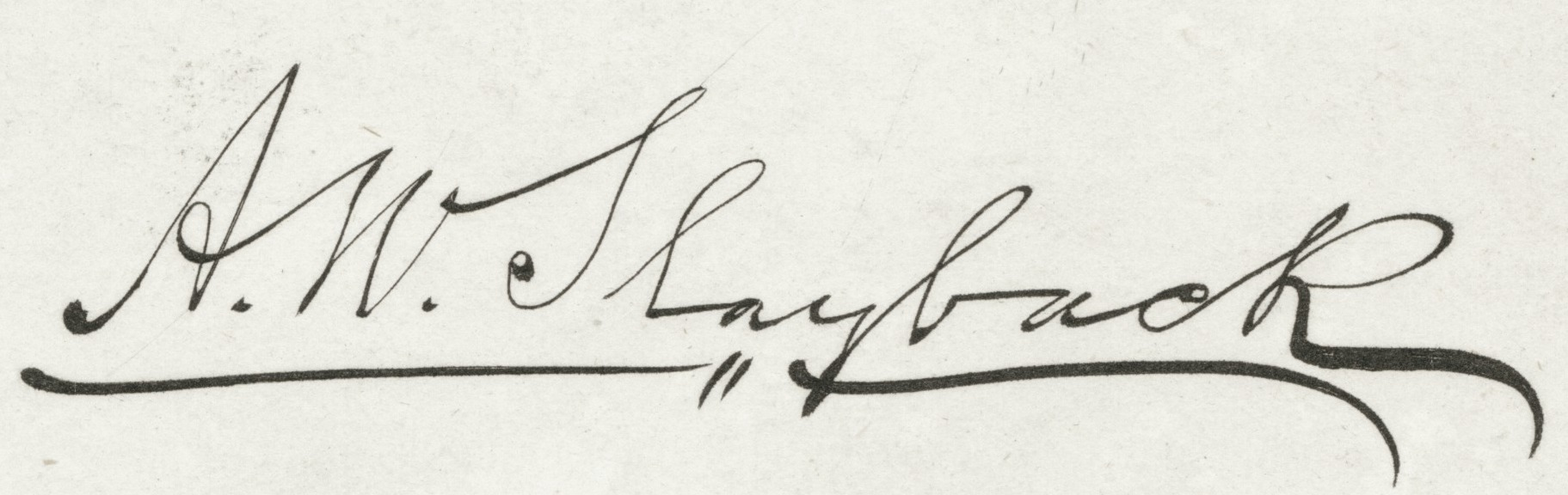

Alonzo William Slayback (July 4, 1838 – October 13, 1882) was an American Confederate military officer and a founder of the Veiled Prophet Parade and Ball in St. Louis, Missouri. He was shot and killed in self-defense by the managing editor of the St. Louis Post-Dispatch.

== Personal ==
Slayback was born July 4, 1838, in Plum Grove, Marion County, Missouri, the son of Alexander Lambdin Slayback, an attorney, and Anna Maria Minter. The father died of cholera at age thirty, leaving his widow, three sons, and a daughter. A college classmate of Alonzo Slayback recalled in 1882 that Alexander Slayback had died when Alonzo and his brother, Charles E. Slayback, "were little children, leaving no property at all."

The one object of their mother's life then was to educate them thoroughly. To this end she toiled as no woman within my recollection ever did, and accomplished her object. Lon became a lawyer, and Charley the well known New Orleans and St. Louis merchant. To the credit of these boys be it said that the first money they made was given to their mother, and from that day she never had an hour's work to do, if they could help it.

Nicknamed "Lon", he was tutored by his mother, and at age 10 he passed an examination which enabled him to enter the Masonic College in Lexington, Missouri. He graduated in 1856, with highest honors in a "full collegiate course."

After college he went to St. Joseph, Missouri, where he read law under Bela M. Hughes and taught school. He was admitted to the bar in 1857, his first partner being Joseph P. Grubb.

On April 14, 1859, Slayback was married to Alice A. Waddell, daughter of William B. Waddell of Lexington, Missouri.

During his military service with the Confederate Army in the American Civil War, he was gravely ill with typhoid fever but was nursed back to health by his wife.

At his death on October 13, 1882, he was survived by his wife and six children, Susanna, 21; Minnette, 14; Katie, 12; Mabel, 9; Grace, 7, and Alonzo W. Jr., 3. Also surviving were three siblings, Charles E. and Preston Slayback and Mrs. Minnie Bond. Susanna, known as Susie, was married on March 5, 1884, to Wellington Adams.

== Professional ==
=== Military ===
It was said that Slayback "was a participant in the Border Ruffian troubles in 1855–56, living at St. Joseph, Missouri, at that time."

Slayback served in the Confederate States of America. He was practicing law in Lexington, Missouri, when, following the lead of Claiborne Fox Jackson, he raised a regiment of cavalry, of which he was elected colonel, and he joined General Sterling Price's command of the Missouri State Guard in June 1861.

The next month, he was visiting his wife in Lexington when he was captured by Union Army troops. He was imprisoned for three weeks, some of the time in Masonic College, where he had gone to school and which had been converted into a prison. He escaped when he hit his guard with a bucket while they were gathering water at a spring.

After the Battle of Lexington in September 1861, he was elected colonel of the 2nd Cavalry Regiment, 5th Division of the Missouri Guard, known as Slayback's Lancers.

In March 1864 General Edmund Kirby Smith appointed him bearer of special dispatches to the Confederate capital in Richmond, Virginia. After, he recruited a regiment of cavalry (called the "Slayback Lancers") was elected colonel, and was attached to a brigade commanded by General Joseph O. Shelby.

He commanded a regiment in the Battle of Pea Ridge, and he was promoted for meritorious conduct at Farmington, Missouri, and at the Siege of Corinth.

At war's end, he joined an expedition to Mexico to avoid surrender after defeat, led by Confederate General Joseph O. Shelby, and spent a year with him. Before they crossed into Mexico, the men ceremoniously lowered the Confederate battle flag into the waters of the Rio Grande. That act impelled Slayback to write a lengthy poem, The Burial of Shelby's Flag.

=== Civilian ===
Slayback was a schoolteacher while studying law. He was admitted to the bar in September 1857 in St. Joseph, Missouri, and practiced there until the outbreak of the Civil War in 1860.

Upon his flight to Mexico, he became ill in Mérida, but Mexican General Tomás O'Horán Escudero, prefect of the city under Maximilian, invited him to his home to convalesce. He learned Spanish and also kept a journal, or a diary of his times, "in the form of letters to his absent wife."

Slayback recounted that he met his mother in Havana, Cuba, in February 1866 and she induced him to return to the United States. They reached New York on February 18, and he went on to Washington, D.C., where he received a pardon from the government.

He returned to St. Louis and built up an eminent law practice. He was twice elected president of the Law Library Association, and he was proud of closing the library on Sundays because "working lawyers work enough on the six working days and ought to rest on Sunday." He was a member of the University Club, the Merchants' Exchange, the Merchants' Benevolent Society, and of the Legion of Honor, No. 6.

Soon after the war ended, Slayback was elected regent of a group of paroled Confederate soldiers to begin "an asylum for the orphans of Missouri rebel deceased."

Editor Sol. Miller of The Kansas Chief newspaper described Slayback "as much a rebel as ever" who said in an August 1868 speech that only by electing a Democratic presidential ticket headed by Horatio Seymour could "God's chosen people, the noblest men who ever lived, the gallant sons of the South," gain what they had fought for."

A lifelong Democrat and the law partner of James O. Brodhead and Herman A. Haeussler, he ran for Congressman-at-large in 1872, in the Second District in 1876 and in the Ninth District against Erastus Wells. He ran also for United States Senator, but withdrew his name during the legislative session considering the appointment.

Governor Charles Henry Hardin appointed Slayback as Missouri's representative to a May 1875 centennial celebration of the signing of the Mecklenburg Declaration of Independence in Charlotte, North Carolina. In the same year, Slayback attended a meeting to help form "a society to provide lectures for the working classes."

==== Publications ====
In August 1873, the Inland Monthly published Slayback's "The Next National Necessity", setting forth "that gentleman's views of the temper and action of the people of the North and South in their relations with each other."

Slayback published a book of poems dealing with "war and love." After his death, his wife published a memorial volume of his writings, with an uncredited biography as the introduction.

==== Postwar speech ====
According to the Daily Missouri Republican, he later "admitted the inherent weakness of the secession idea and the perception of it by the confederate soldiers at an early stage of their struggle." In a speech given at the decoration of both Union and Confederate soldiers' graves on May 30, 1873, Slayback said that the Southern soldiers had

cast their eyes upon the government at Richmond, and its constitution recognizing the right of any state in certain contingencies to set up a separate nationality for itself, with its little president and its little senate, its little supreme court and its little navy, with its Palmetto, its Pelican, or its Lone Star for a flag, and the soldier began to ask himself, "For what am I fighting?

The Rolla (Missouri) Weekly Herald noted that the speech "seems to meet with almost universal approval, as expressive of a returning spirit of fraternity, by which alone is the genuine work of reconstruction to be accomplished." The Cash-Book of Jackson, Missouri, however, said it spoke for "thousands of ex-Rebs, who utterly deny that Slayback represented the prevailing sentiment of the South at the time of the surrender" and that the speech was "silly twaddle."

==== Veiled Prophet celebration ====
Historian Thomas M. Spencer has credited Slayback with "all of the work" that the latter "had put into creating" the organization responsible for the St. Louis Veiled Prophet celebrations, beginning in 1878.

Slayback wrote the description or story line for St. Louis's first Veiled Prophet parade. He noted in his diary:

Today I gave to the printer the descriptive manuscript whereby I have woven a classical story and brought into order and coherency the "Floats" for the Parade, or illuminated nocturnal pageant of the secret society known as the "Veiled Prophets." I think it is the nearest thing to a "stroke of genius" that I ever produced."

In 1882, a movement by St. Louis Irish Americans forced the parade organizers to withdraw a float that was to have featured, in the words of historian Spencer, "a Donnybrook Fair with several jig-dancing and seemingly drunken Irishmen, [which] was certainly in accordance with the usual stereotype of the Irish at the time." Slayback then challenged the protestors:

Let them raise a finger against any part of the pageant, if they dare. I feel sure that there will be on hand a sufficiently large number of people who have St. Louis's interest at heart to prevent any sort of attack. Yes, sir. Just let them try it.

== Death ==
=== Editorial page article ===
Slayback was a law partner of James O. Broadhead, and "bitter controversy had arisen" between Broadhead and John M. Glover "over a race for Congress."

On Friday, October 13, 1882, the editorial page of the St. Louis Post-Dispatch printed the following (quoted only in part):

Mr. Alonzo W. Slayback, an individual whose chief claim to distinction rests upon the fact that he is the law partner of Col. James O. Broadhead, rose in a meeting of Democratic ward politicians in this city last night and without personal provocation proceeded to apply a string of vile and virulent epithets to the Post-Dispatch and its conductors, making charges which he knew to be false.

In fact, so far from being a brave man, the Colonel ... is a coward. He dare not be brave except in a courtroom or a church and he will beg or cringe out of any difficulty which his vaporing humor may have gotten him. ... Now the "Colonel's" title[,] I believe, is Colonel Alonzo W. Slayback. The word Alonzo is of Etruscan origin and means "coward," ... and the title "Colonel" is never applied except in derision and originated in the gallant manner in which the "Colonel" once marshaled a female sewing society. — JOHN M. GLOVER

=== Shooting and inquest ===
Slayback went later that day to the Post-Dispatch editorial offices "to demand retraction or seek satisfaction." He had a gun with him, and, according to testimony at a coroner's inquest, he threatened John A. Cockerill, the managing editor and chief editorial writer of the newspaper. Cockerill had his own weapon and fired, killing Slayback.

Five members of the six-man coroner's jury and all witnesses took the oath at the Slayback home in the presence of the body, as was "usual" in homicide cases, and then the inquest adjourned to the Criminal Court chambers. After testimony of Cockerill and other witnesses, the jurors adopted a verdict that Slayback had died "from the effects of internal hemorrhage, caused by a penetrating gunshot wound in the chest, inflicted with a bullet fired from a revolver in the hand of J. A. Cockerill, a few minutes before death."

Although jailed for a time and the object of Grand Jury investigations, Cockerill was never put on trial.

=== Funeral ===
The funeral service at the Slayback residence on October 15 "was perhaps the largest that ever occurred in St. Louis", it was reported. The cortege "consisted of 142 carriages and about fifty buggies containing members of the family and friends, the Knights of St. Patrick, Legion of Honor, Bar Association, Southern Historical Society and Benevolent order of Elks[, which] proceeded directly to Bellefontain Cemetery."

Slayback's body was taken to Lexington, Missouri, aboard a special car donated by the Missouri Pacific Railway, where it was received by a party of Confederate veterans headed by General Joseph O. Shelby. It was interred in "the old cemetery" (Machpelah Cemetery) within sight of the Masonic College "where Col. Slayback received his education and where he fought his first battle."

=== Tributes ===
- Slayback was honored with a memorial service at the St. Louis Exchange.
- A matinee of Shakespeare's Antony and Cleopatra was given by "the well-known actor" and "very warm friend of Col. Cockerill", John McCullough (who acted as Brutus), at the Olympic Theater, St. Louis, as a benefit for the Slayback family. It netted between $7,000 and $8,000. Receipts at the door amounted to $6,797. "The building was jammed from pit to dome," one newspaper reported. "It was, perhaps, the grandest audience that ever greeted this great tragedian."
- Union General William Tecumseh Sherman said: "I knew both of the parties well. Col. Slayback was one of nature's noblemen, generous to a fault, and had an unlimited number of friends. Mr. Cockerill's father was in my command during the war."

=== Insurance ===
Questions were raised whether insurance companies would pay a benefit on Slayback's policies "if it is proved that Col. Slayback went into the Post-Dispatch office with a drawn revolver." Eventually, there was an insurance payout of $20,000, although another report put the sum at "fully $40,000" based on more than one policy, and some said that the total sum available to the family, including the benefit, was fifty thousand dollars.
