= A. E. Wollheim da Fonseca =

German author

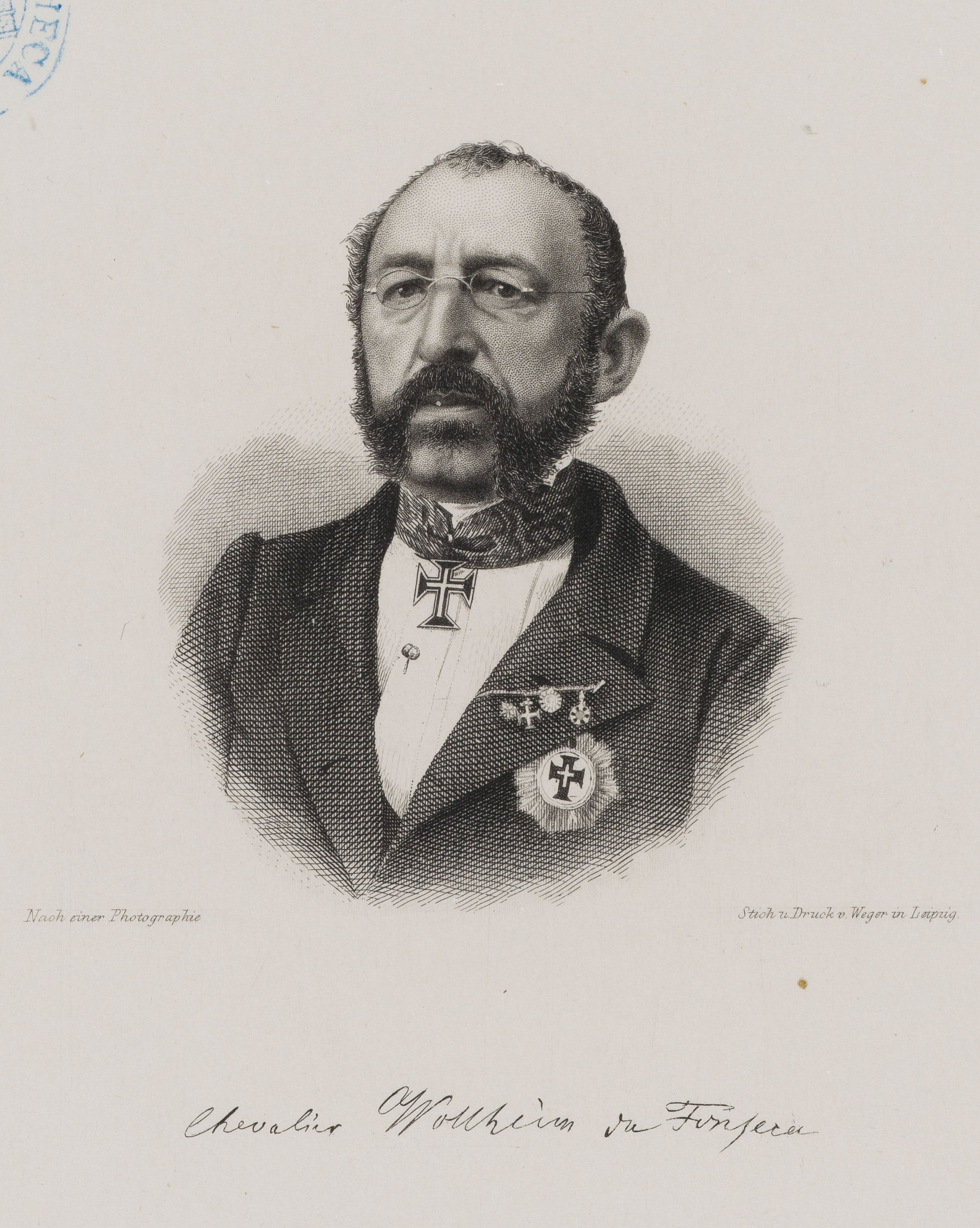
Copperplate engraving by August Weger

Anton Eduard Wollheim da Fonseca; also known as Wollheim von Secka (12 February 1810 – d. 24 October 1884) was a German writer, dramaturge, linguist and diplomat.

== Education and military life ==
He was born in Hamburg, the son of the Jewish merchant Hirsch Wollheim and his wife Antonie, née von Secka. He attended secondary school in Wrocław (then known by its German name as Breslau) and in Hamburg. He then studied philosophy, philology, history and political science in Berlin and earned a doctorate there in 1831 for his analysis in Latin of some chapters of the Sanskrit Padma-Purāṇa, an encyclopedic Vaiṣṇava religious text.

During a subsequent study trip to Paris, Wollheim became engaged to the daughter of a Portuguese nobleman and was motivated by this to fight in the Portuguese Civil War in the army of Prince Pedro de Alcântara, who later became Emperor Pedro I of Brazil.

After a rapid promotion to lieutenant for unusual bravery, he was seriously wounded by lance thrusts and resigned from the military. For his services to Pedro's cause, he was later knighted by the Emperor's daughter, Maria II of Portugal, and given the title "chevalier de Fonseca".

After the death of his fiancée, Wollheim da Fonseca worked for several years in Det Kongelige Bibliotek, Copenhagen's royal library, cataloguing Sanskrit and Pāli manuscripts from Danish India and serving as private secretary to the Danish king, Frederik VI.

From 1838 to 1840 he lived in Vienna, where he tried to work as a diplomat for Austria, but was unable to stay because of his liberal views. An 1840 application for a Sanskrit professorship in Leipzig was rejected because he had converted to Catholicism during his military service in Portugal.

== Academic and writing career ==
From 1842 to 1848 Wollheim da Fonseca was dramaturge at the Hamburgische Staatsoper. At the same time, from 1847 he was accredited as a government interpreter for 11 languages. In 1842 he married the widowed Dorothea Alexandrie Marie Goldschmidt, née Leffmann, from Copenhagen. From 1849 to 1852 Wollheim da Fonseca was a lecturer in oriental and modern European languages at the University of Berlin and at the same time a correspondent for a London morning newspaper. During this time he was also a member of the literary club Tunnel über der Spree and was friends with the realist German novelist and poet Theodor Fontane (1819–1898).

He moved back to Vienna for a while before taking over the management of the Hamburgische Staatsoper from 1858 to 1861. After further stays in Vienna and Paris, Wollheim da Fonseca founded the seasonal Flora Theatre in the St. Georg quarter of Hamburg in 1868, but it did not last long.

During the 1870-1871 Franco-Prussian War, he edited the Moniteur officiel du Gouvernement general à Reims, a newspaper for occupied France that supported German interests. He was awarded the Iron Cross of Imperial Germany for this successful work. His attempt to habilitate in Berlin in 1878 failed due to objections from the professors there.

In 1840 Wollheim da Fonseca retranslated Friðþjófs saga from Esaias Tegnér's renowned 1825 Swedish version into German. Wollheim first performed his stage adaptation of Goethe's Faust, Part Two in 1854. His works include Indiscretionen eines patriotischen Reptils (“Indiscretions of a patriotic reptile”, a 1883 memoir, and Neue Indiscretionen (“New indiscretions,” 1884). In 1879 he translated Os Lusíadas from Portuguese (1879) into German as Die Lusiaden. He wrote several language textbooks and dictionaries, as well as stage works, treatises on history and many other works.

Wollheim da Fonseca fascinated contemporaries with his eloquence and his talent for languages. His friend Theodor Fontane reported the bon mot that "he spoke 33 languages and lied in 34" — alluding to a tendency to exaggeration. His last years, however, were marked by financial difficulties, and he became dependent on gifts from a wealthy relative, Caesar Wollheim. A late marriage to Antonie Romanowska from St. Petersburg was socially inappropriate for his status and put these donations at risk. Anton Eduard Wollheim da Fonseca died in 1884 at the age of 74 in Berlin and was buried in the St. Hedwig Cemetery on Liesenstraße. The tombstone has not been preserved.

== Works ==
Scientific works

- De nonnullis Padmapurâni capitibus (“On some chapters of the Padma-Purāṇa”), doctoral thesis, Berlin 1831.
- Lokanîti. Ethische Sprüche in der Pali-Sprache (“Ethical maxims in the Pāli language”).
- Lexicon latino-sanscritum (“Latin-Sanskrit dictionary,” Hamburg, 1840.
- Kurzgefaßte Mythologie aller Völker der Erde (“Brief mythology of all the peoples of the earth”), Hamburg 1850.
- Mythologie des alten Indien (“Mythology of ancient India”). Berlin: Gustav Hempel, 1856.
