= Charles E. Slayback =

St. Louis philanthropist and grain executive

Charles E. Slayback

Charles E. Slayback (March 27, 1840 – September 29, 1924) was an American grain merchant in New Orleans, Louisiana, and St. Louis, Missouri. He was a founder of St. Louis's Veiled Prophet Organization.

== Early life ==
Slayback was born on March 27, 1840, in Marion County, Missouri, the second child of Alexander L. Slayback of Ohio, a lawyer, and Anna Slayback. In 1847, the family moved from Shelbyville, Missouri, to Lexington, Missouri, where the father died in 1848 at age 31. He had two brothers, Alonzo and Preston, and a sister.

Charles and his brother Preston both registered on the same day for the draft during the American Civil War, but neither served, their places being taken by substitutes, Alonzo, however, raised a regiment, of which he was colonel, and was active in the war.

== Career ==
Slayback left home at age 16 and found employment in the financial sector with a salary of $25 a month, which was raised to $30 at the end of his first year. He left for another company, where he was made a partner at age 22.

He subsequently moved to New Orleans, where in 1869, he was elected organizing president of a social and merchandising club. In January 1870, he was elected to the board of directors of the city's Merchants' Bank, one of several directorships of banks and insurance companies he would hold. That same year, he was secretary of a committee of the "leading citizens under the style of an 'Electoral Jury of Fifty'" which was charged with advising Louisiana Governor Henry C. Warmoth on the postwar organization of the city of New Orleans. By 1873, he had his own business in New Orleans and was vice president of the Chamber of Commerce.

Slayback and his family moved from New Orleans to St. Louis over the winter of 1874–75. "He immediately became a factor in the civic life of the city and was famous for his gift of repartee, which made him a welcome guest at social functions, no matter what their nature," the St. Louis Globe-Democrat newspaper wrote upon his death.

Slayback became a prosperous grain broker. For several years, he was chancellor of the American Legion of Honor in St. Louis.

In 1878, Slayback helped establish the Veiled Prophet Society, a club for St. Louis' business elite. He "called a meeting of local business and civic leaders. His intention was to form a secret society that would blend the pomp and ritual of a New Orleans Mardi Gras with the symbolism used by the Irish poet Thomas Moore. From Moore’s poetry, Slayback and the St. Louis elite created the myth of the Veiled Prophet of Khorassan, a mystic traveller who inexplicably decided to make St. Louis his base of operations," wrote Scott Beauchamp in The Atlantic, citing historian Thomas Spencer, who said the organization was intended to help enforce racial and class order in the city.

In January 1882, when Slayback was a principal in Slayback, Smythe & Co., he was elected president of the Merchants Exchange of St. Louis.

== Later years and death ==
Slayback moved to Chicago, Illinois, after 1883 to live with his daughter, Bertha S. Carel. He died there on September 29, 1924. He is buried in Lexington, Missouri.
