= American Legion of Honor =

The American Legion of Honor was a fraternal benefit order that was active in the late 19th century and early 20th century. In its heyday, it was one of the best known benefit societies.

== History ==
The organization was founded on December 18, 1878, in Boston, Massachusetts, by Dr. Darius Wilson and nine others. Some of the founders had helped found the Royal Arcanum. Wilson was also connected with the Knights of Honor and was reportedly a member of the Ancient Order of United Workmen.

== Membership and benefits ==
Membership was open to white men and women 18 to 50 years of age, the upper age limit having been lowered from 64 in 1885. There were initiation ceremonies but, if the candidate objected, these could be dispensed with and a formal obligation could be taken at any time and place. The order had a three-tier structure: local units were called "Subordinate Councils"; above them were the "Grand" or "State Councils"; representatives of the latter and all living Past Supreme Commanders made up the "Supreme Council".

The order issued certificates of US$1,000}, US$2,000, or US$3,000 each, at their option, and those certificates carried a "graduate weekly benefit."

The Legion reached its largest membership at the end of 1889 with 62,457. Like many fraternal organizations, the Legion ran into financial difficulties in 1895 and 1896. These were caused by a number of factors, including the Panic of 1896, an increased death rate, increased expenses and debts, "unusually high" assessments in 1896, and a lack of new members. The total membership on December 31, 1895, was 53,210; a year later it was 36,028.

Like many fraternal orders of its time, the American Legion of Honor was based on inadequate rates that eventually led to bankruptcy. While the organization was successful in the early years, as the mortality of its membership increased, the order could no longer pay promised benefits as fewer people joined and others withdrew. (This phenomenon is known in insurance jargon as "adverse selection", as sicker persons retain their memberships and younger, healthier persons fail to join in adequate numbers to offset the claims paid out.) In 1903, for instance, only 51 members joined, bringing in $755,000; while 2,004 members either died or withdrew, taking over $3 million with them. The order went into receivership in August 1904.

== Other "Legions of Honor" ==
There were two groups related to the ALH, though their precise relationship with each other is unclear.

=== Iowa Legion of Honor ===
The Iowa Legion of Honor was founded in 1878 and, as the name implied, was designed for the residents of the state of Iowa (though members who left the state could keep their membership). This group was open to men and women, though in separate divisions, and members lives could be insured for US$1,000 or US$2,000. There were only two levels of organizations, the "Subordinate Lodges" and the "Grand Lodge", which met biennially. The founders of the Iowa Legion of Honor stated that they "were not members of any particular organization of like nature". There were 7,500 members in 1896. By 1905, membership was down to 4,300 and the group went out of existence some time after 1910.

=== Northwest Legion of Honor ===
The Northwest Legion of Honor was incorporated in the state of Iowa on March 12, 1884. Unlike the Iowa Legion of Honor, this order extended its jurisdiction to the Dakotas, Nebraska, Kansas and Minnesota, as well as Iowa. Membership was open to acceptable white persons eighteen to fifty years of age, who were not engaged in an extra-hazardous profession. Like the ILH it had only Subordinate Councils and a Grand Council. It had a ritual that taught benevolence and its motto was "We Work Together". Its total membership in 1896 was 2,500. The NLH "frankly admit[ed]" to being an "offspring" of the American Legion of Honor

The Northwest Legion of Honor offered insurance certificates of US$500, US$1,000, US$2,000, and US$3,000. Assessments were graded by age, and one fifth was set aside for a fund to be used in the case of an epidemic or other increase in the death rate.

== See also ==
- List of North American fraternal benefit orders
