= 2000 United States Senate election in Missouri =

- November 7, 2000
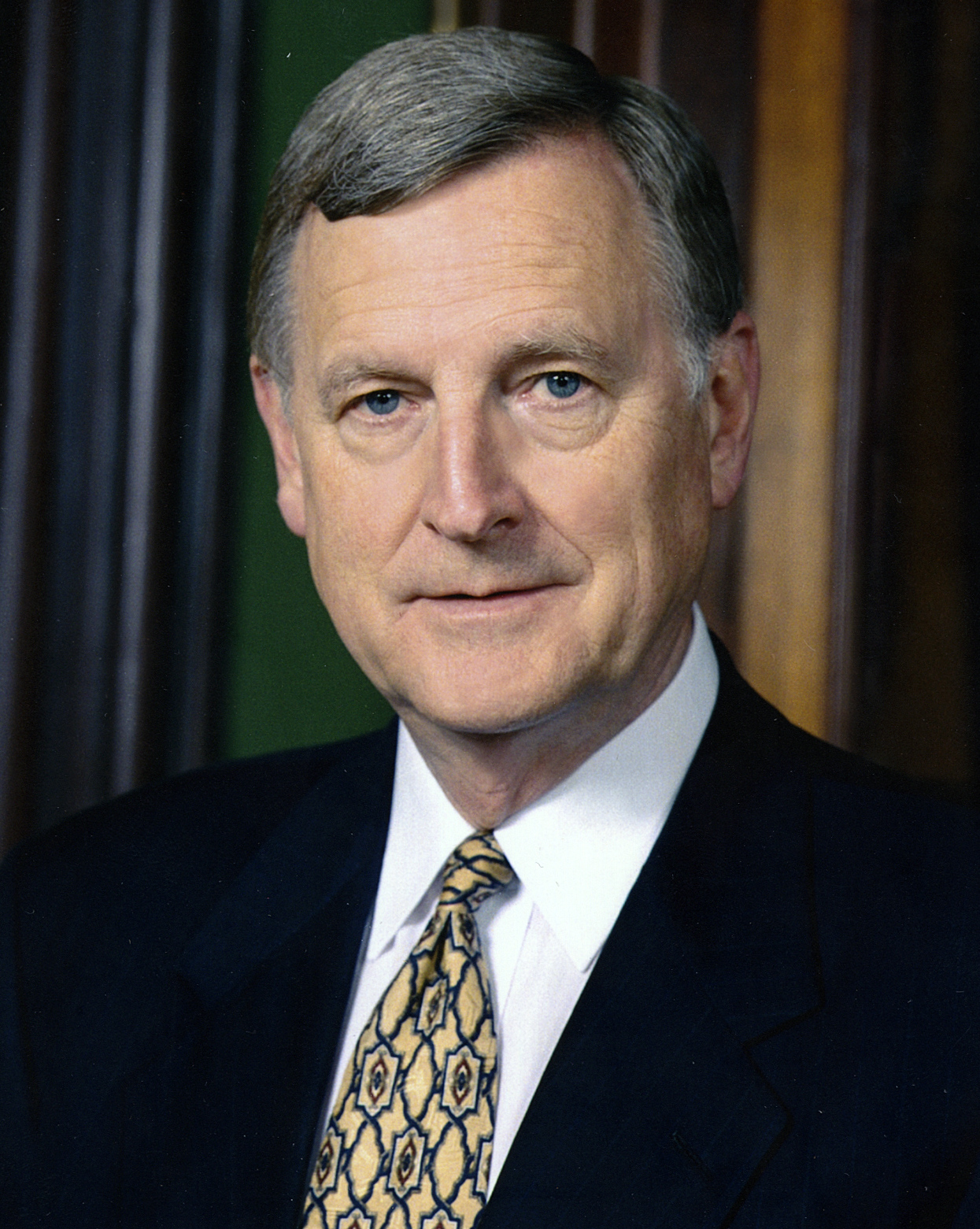

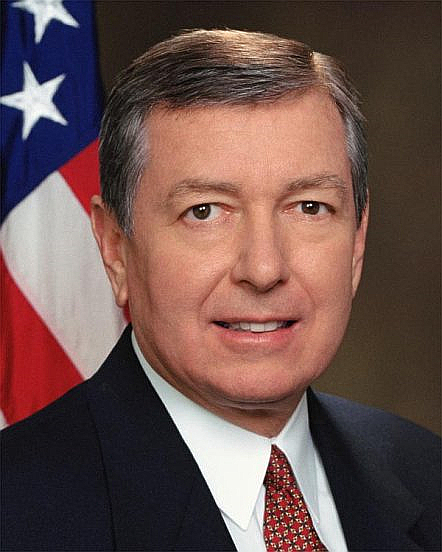
	Majority party	Minority party
Party	Democratic	Republican
Popular vote	1,191,812	1,142,852
Percentage	50.46%	48.39%
- Carnahan: 50–60% 60–70% 70–80% Ashcroft: 40–50% 50–60% 60–70% 70–80%
U.S. senator before election
John Ashcroft
Republican
Elected U.S. Senator
Mel Carnahan †
Democratic

The 2000 United States Senate election in Missouri was held on November 7, 2000. Democratic governor Mel Carnahan defeated Republican incumbent John Ashcroft despite his death in a plane crash on October 16. After the election, Governor Roger Wilson appointed Carnahan's widow Jean to fill the seat until a special election was held in 2002.

Primary elections were held on August 9 with both Ashcroft, seeking a second term, and Carnahan facing only token opposition and winning large majorities.

Following his defeat, Ashcroft was appointed United States attorney general by George W. Bush and served from 2001 to 2005. As of 2026, this is the only time a deceased person has won a Senate election in the chamber's history.

== Background ==
John Ashcroft had first been elected in 1994 with close to 60 percent of the vote amidst a national Republican wave. As senator, he established a reputation as an advocate for welfare reform, tax reform, and socially conservative policies. Beginning in 1997, Ashcroft visited numerous crucial states and considered running for president, Senate, or even both simultaneously, as was permitted under Missouri law. On January 5, 1999, Ashcroft announced that he would not seek the presidency and would run only for a second term in the Senate.

His opponent was Democratic incumbent governor Mel Carnahan, who was barred from running for a third term in office having previously been elected governor twice, in 1992 and 1996. Carnahan had previously served in other statewide offices, including as lieutenant governor during Ashcroft's term as governor from 1989 to 1993. He also had been seen as a prospective candidate for U.S. Senate for many years, including against Ashcroft in 1994. Carnahan announced his campaign for the seat on November 4, 1998, with opinion polling showing him leading Ashcroft.

The Missouri election was expected to be one of the most hotly contested in the country. Missouri was often considered a swing state and a national bellwether in presidential elections, having voted for the winner in every presidential election from 1904, with the exception of the 1956 presidential election. Ashcroft and Carnahan were also both considered complements to their parties' respective presumptive nominees for president, George W. Bush and Al Gore.

== Republican primary ==
=== Candidates ===
- John Ashcroft, incumbent U.S. senator since 1995 and former governor of Missouri
- Marc Perkel

=== Results ===
Republican primary results
Party	Candidate	Votes	%
Republican	John Ashcroft (incumbent)	327,442	89.60%
Republican	Marc Perkel	38,103	10.40%
Total votes		365,545	100.0%

== Democratic primary ==
=== Candidates ===
- Mel Carnahan, governor of Missouri
- Ronald Waggoner

=== Results ===
Democratic primary results
Party	Candidate	Votes	%
Democratic	Mel Carnahan	323,841	78.20%
Democratic	Ronald Waggoner	90,251	21.80%
Total votes		414,092	100.0%

== General election ==
=== Candidates ===
- John Ashcroft, incumbent U.S. senator since 1995 (Republican)
- Mel Carnahan, governor of Missouri (Democratic) (died October 16)
- Charles Dockins (Natural Law)
- Hugh Foley (Reform)
- Grant Samuel Stauffer (Libertarian)
- Evaline Taylor (Green)

=== Campaign ===
Ashcroft campaigned by bus across the state, centering his message on "Missouri Values." Similarly, Carnahan held a four-day train tour as an homage to Missouri native and former president Harry S. Truman, who had held this seat in the 1930s and 1940s.

The race became negative early. Ashcroft was attacked for his role in defeating the nomination of Ronnie L. White to a United States district court. Ashcroft had attacked White, who was black, as "pro-criminal." Carnahan and many black leaders criticized Ashcroft's opposition as racially motivated. Ashcroft was also criticized by Carnahan for voting against a prescription drug benefit for Medicare, voting for the removal of Bill Clinton from office, and his conservative positions in general. Ashcroft also faced controversy for accepting an honorary degree from Bob Jones University, a Christian college which faced controversy over some of its views.

Carnahan was attacked for past actions, including wearing blackface in a 1960 sketch and commuting the death sentence of Darrell J. Mease at the behest of Pope John Paul II. The candidates disagreed on issues including healthcare, education and Social Security, mirroring the national presidential election.

The candidates were close in the polls and in fundraising through October, with this becoming one of the most expensive campaigns in the nation. Ashcroft received significant funding from Monsanto, which was headquartered in St. Louis and gave five times more to Ashcroft than any other congressional candidate in 2000. Ashcroft was later fined by the Federal Election Commission for failure to disclose donors.

=== Debates ===
The candidates debated twice. The first debate was held on October 13 in St. Louis on KMOX. The second debate was held on October 15 on KCPT-TV in Kansas City. A third debate was planned to be held in Cape Girardeau, but its details had not been finalized before Carnahan's death on October 16.

=== Carnahan plane crash ===
On October 16, the day after the second debate, Carnahan spent the day campaigning. At around 6:45 that evening, he planned to depart to New Madrid for a meeting with Black leaders in Missouri. However, failing instruments and bad weather conditions caused his plane to crash at around 7:30 in rural Jefferson County. Carnahan was killed, along with his son and a longtime aide. In response, Ashcroft suspended all campaigning on the day of the crash and did not resume until October 31, eight days before the election. Carnahan's death also came one day before the third presidential debate in St. Louis. Both Al Gore and George W. Bush offered tributes to the recently deceased governor before the debate.

Because Missouri law did not permit candidates to be withdrawn after October 13, Carnahan's name remained on the ballot. Lieutenant governor Roger B. Wilson was officially sworn in as governor and promised that if Carnahan won the election, he would appoint his widow, Jean Carnahan. Jean Carnahan accepted the appointment and continued her late husband's campaign, using a new slogan, "Don't let the fire go out!" and received an outpouring of support. The election quickly became a campaign of emotion. Polls bore this out; prior to Carnahan's death, Ashcroft had begun to lead in opinion polling, but some of the final polls in the race showed Carnahan with a sizable lead, which only grew when voters were informed of the planned appointment of his widow.

Carnahan's death, his widow's open embrace of his posthumous candidacy, and the subsequent outpouring of support put Ashcroft in a difficult position. Without an opponent, Ashcroft was tried to turn the campaign's focus to policy issues, enlisting the help of former senator John Danforth, who filmed an advertisement encouraging voters to look at Ashcroft's experience. But due to the unique circumstances of the election, Ashcroft found it hard to regain the momentum. He commented in a television interview that suspending his campaign had damaged him politically, but he maintained that it was the right thing to do. In the final week, Ashcroft focused exclusively on the issues, stringently avoiding any mentions of Carnahan.

=== Polling ===
Poll source	Date(s)	Sample size	Margin of error	John Ashcroft (R)	Mel Carnahan (D)	Other / undecided (Note: Calculated by taking the difference of 100% and all other candidates combined.)
Zogby Analytics	November 5, 2000	597	—	49%	49%	2%
Harris Insights & Analytics	November 3, 2000	5,833	—	49%	49%	2%
Zogby Analytics	November 2, 2000	600	—	45%	48%	7%
Research 2000	November 1, 2000	600	—	42%	47%	11%
Zogby Analytics	October 30, 2000	600	—	45%	47%	8%
Rasmussen Reports	October 29, 2000	1,243	—	46%	48%	6%
Zogby Analytics	October 27, 2000	600	—	43%	50%	7%
Zogby Analytics	October 25, 2000	603	—	45%	47%	8%
Mason-Dixon Polling & Strategy	October 24, 2000	625	—	46%	46%	8%
Rasmussen Reports	October 23, 2000	1,072	—	49%	46%	5%
	October 16–18, 2000	Carnahan dies in a plane crash				

=== Results ===
Despite his death, Carnahan won by a margin of approximately 49 thousand votes. He was the first person posthumously elected to the United States Senate. (Note: In 1962, voters in California elected Clement Woodnutt Miller to the House of Representatives one month after his death in a plane crash. In 1972, two other Representatives, Nick Begich of Alaska and Hale Boggs of Louisiana were re-elected after their plane went missing in the Alaska wilderness. They were both declared dead in absentia after the election.) Rick Hardy, professor of political science at the University of Missouri commented that Ashcroft lost the election because his candidacy was overwhelmed by a campaign of "emotion and symbolism."

2000 United States Senate election in Missouri
Party	Candidate	Votes	%
Democratic	Mel Carnahan †	1,191,812	50.46%
Republican	John Ashcroft (incumbent)	1,142,852	48.39%
Green	Evaline Taylor	10,612	0.45%
Libertarian	Grant Samuel Stauffer	10,198	0.43%
Reform	Hugh Foley	4,166	0.18%
Natural Law	Charles Dockins	1,933	0.08%
Write-in		13	0.00%
Total votes		2,361,586	100.0
Democratic gain from Republican			

==== Counties that flipped from Republican to Democratic ====
- Dunklin (largest city: Kennett)
- Mississippi (largest city: Charleston)
- New Madrid (largest city: New Madrid)
- Pemiscot (largest city: Caruthersville)
- Reynolds (largest city: Ellington)
- Iron (largest city: Ironton)
- St. Francois (largest city: Farmington)
- Sainte Genevieve (largest city: Ste. Genevieve)
- Jefferson (largest city: Arnold)
- Pike (largest city: Bowling Green)
- Clark (largest city: Kahoka)
- Jackson (largest city: Kansas City)
- St. Louis (largest city: Florissant)
- Callaway (largest city: Fulton)
- Howard (largest city: Fayette)
- Randolph (largest city: Moberly)
- Boone (largest city: Columbia)
- Linn (largest city: Brookfield)
- Henry (largest city: Clinton)
- Saline (largest city: Marshall)
- Clay (largest city: Liberty)
- Ray (largest city: Richmond)
- Lafayette (largest city: Odessa)
- Clinton (largest city: Cameron)
- Buchanan (largest city: St. Joseph)

== Aftermath ==
There was speculation that the results would be subject to a legal challenge. Even before the election, Republicans claimed that Carnahan would be ineligible due to him being dead, which Democrats dismissed as attempts to decrease support for the deceased governor. A point of contention among Republicans was the decision of judge Evelyn Baker to extend polling hours in the city of St. Louis until 10:00 PM, 3 hours after polls in the city should have closed. Baker claimed that huge turnout overwhelmed the polling places, and so many people were being denied the ability to vote. A state appellate court soon overturned Baker's ruling, and polls consequently closed 45 minutes after schedule. Kit Bond, the state's Republican senior senator alleged that this was voter fraud, and called for a federal investigation. Ultimately, nothing came of any of these issues, and Ashcroft declined to challenge the result.

Asked by the media whether he would ever seek office again, Ashcroft responded, "The last thing I want to do is think about running for public office again." In December 2000, he was chosen for the position of United States Attorney General by President-elect George W. Bush and his nomination was confirmed by the Senate by a vote of 58 to 42. He served from February 2, 2001 until February 3, 2005.

Keeping to his word, Governor Roger B. Wilson appointed Carnahan's widow, Jean Carnahan, to fill the vacant seat until a successor could be duly elected. The appointment was made official on in early December after the final results had been certified. Carnahan was sworn in on January 3, 2001, along with the rest of the senators elected the previous year.

In 2002, a special election was held to complete the remainder of Carnahan's Senate term. Jean Carnahan ran for election but was defeated by Republican Jim Talent with a margin of approximately 1.1 percent or 21.000 votes.

== See also ==
- 2000 United States Senate elections
- 2000 United States House of Representatives elections in Missouri
- 2000 United States presidential election in Missouri
- 2000 Missouri gubernatorial election
