= 2006 United States Senate election in Missouri =

- November 7, 2006
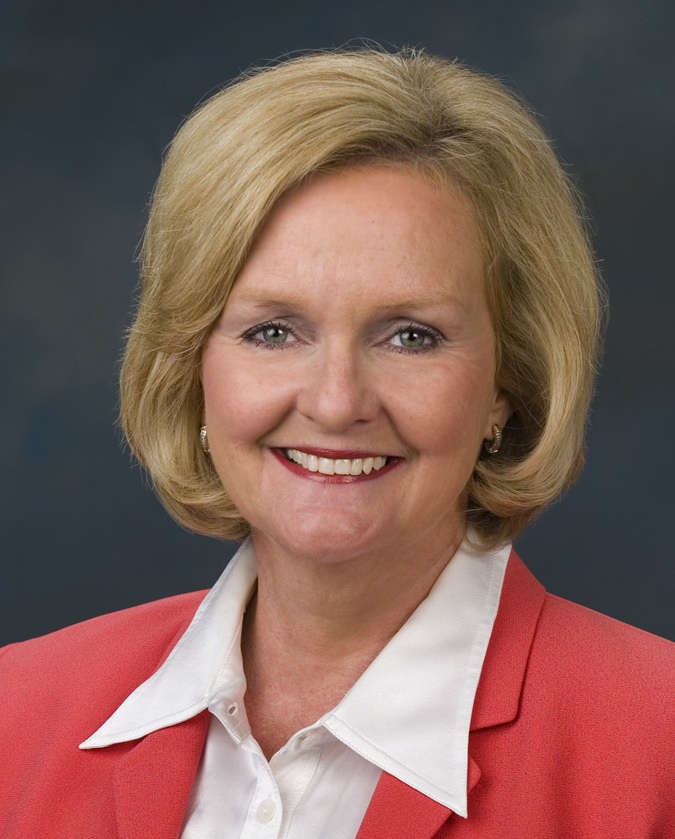

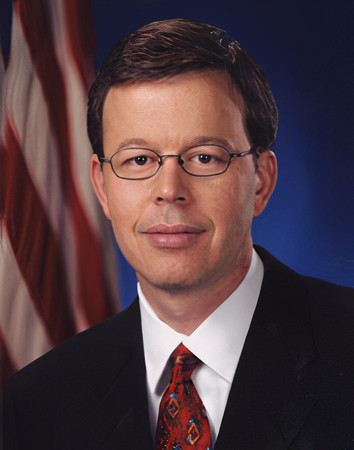
Nominee	Claire McCaskill	Jim Talent
Party	Democratic	Republican
Popular vote	1,055,255	1,006,941
Percentage	49.58%	47.31%
- County results McCaskill: 40–50% 50–60% 60–70% 70–80% Talent: 40–50% 50–60% 60–70% 70–80%
U.S. senator before election
Jim Talent
Republican
Elected U.S. Senator
Claire McCaskill
Democratic

The 2006 United States Senate election in Missouri was held on November 7, 2006, to decide who would serve as senator for Missouri between January 3, 2007, and January 3, 2013. This election was the fifth consecutive even-number year in which a senate election was held in Missouri, after elections in 1998, 2000, 2002, and 2004.

Incumbent Republican Senator Jim Talent was elected in a 2002 special election over incumbent Democrat Jean Carnahan, who was appointed to the Senate seat after the posthumous election of her husband Mel Carnahan, who died in a plane crash shortly before the 2000 election. Talent ran for re-election for his first full term; his Democratic opponent was Missouri State Auditor Claire McCaskill.

Both Talent and McCaskill faced unknowns in their respective primaries on August 8 and defeated them soundly. Early on the morning of November 8, Talent conceded defeat to McCaskill, having faced considerable political headwinds. Talent lost the election with 47% of the vote, to 50% of the vote for McCaskill. This was the last election an incumbent Republican senator lost in Missouri.

== Background ==
The election was expected to be very close, given the seat had changed hands twice, both by very narrow margins, in the prior six years. In 2000, former Missouri Governor Mel Carnahan, a Democrat, narrowly defeated incumbent Republican Senator John Ashcroft 50% to 48%. Mel Carnahan died in a plane crash three weeks before election day, so his widow Jean Carnahan was appointed to the seat after the election. Two years later, in a special election held for the seat, incumbent Senator Jean Carnahan lost an even closer election to former Congressman Jim Talent, 50% to 49%.

=== State politics ===
The state of Missouri was a bellwether state throughout the 20th century. It had voted for the winner of every presidential election starting in 1904, except for in 1956, when the state narrowly favored Adlai Stevenson over Dwight D. Eisenhower.

The state itself is bordered by both the South and Midwestern United States. In statewide elections for much of the prior century, Missouri had favored the Democratic Party. Beginning in 2000, however, Missouri began a gradual drift toward the Republican Party. In the 2000 and 2004 presidential elections, George W. Bush carried Missouri with a margin slightly greater than he received nationally.

Bush's 2004 victory also saw Missouri Republicans triumph in several down-ballot elections. Senator Kit Bond was re-elected by a decisive margin, and Matt Blunt won the election for governor, narrowly defeating state auditor Claire McCaskill. The Republican Party also captured control of the state legislature for the first time in 80 years.

=== National significance ===
The Missouri contest was seen as vitally important to control of the United States Senate. Democrats needed to win six seats to take control of the chamber with 51 seats. To do this, they would need to retain their 19 incumbent seats, win two Republican-held seats in states won by John Kerry in 2004 (Rhode Island and Pennsylvania), and win four races in five states Bush had won (Missouri, Montana, Ohio, Tennessee and Virginia). Thus, if Talent were re-elected, Republicans would need to win only one other seat to retain control of the Senate.

== General election ==
=== Candidates ===
- Frank Gilmour, small business owner (Libertarian)
- Lydia Lewis, retired functional systems analyst (Progressive)
- Claire McCaskill, state auditor of Missouri, former state representative and nominee for governor in 2004 (Democratic)
- Jim Talent, incumbent U.S. senator since 2002 (Republican)

=== Campaign ===
Talent, anticipating a tough re-election battle and attempting to dissuade challengers, had accumulated a large campaign fund. For most of 2005, he had no opposition. State Senator Chuck Graham had briefly entered the race early in the year, but dropped out soon after. However, on August 30, 2005, Democrat Claire McCaskill announced her intention to run for Talent's Senate seat.

McCaskill started with a large financial disadvantage, but she was also an experienced candidate with high name recognition. McCaskill had run two successful campaigns for state auditor. She was also a candidate for governor in 2004, when she defeated the incumbent Democratic Governor Bob Holden in the primary election but lost with 48% of the vote in the general election.

Talent started statewide advertising on August 1, 2006, forcing some observers to suggest that Talent was on the ropes and therefore needed to reassert his image (damaged recently by his "flip-flopping" on stem cell research, his opposition to raising the minimum wage and a general feeling of antipathy from the body politic regarding his lack of notable achievements while in the Senate) and pull ahead in a statistical dead heat.

==== Embryonic stem cell research ====
Since joining the Senate in 2002, Talent had supported federal legislation that would ban stem cell research. This included co-sponsoring a bill (S.658) sponsored by Senator Sam Brownback which would ban all forms of human cloning, including the cloning and destruction of human embryos.

On February 10, 2006, Talent withdrew his support for the bill, citing the need to balance research and protection against human cloning. This move followed criticism by Talent's Democratic opponent in the 2006 election, Claire McCaskill, as well as pressure from Missouri business interests that oppose restrictions on stem cell research. Though this reversal was widely criticized as being due to politics, Talent told the Associated Press, "The technology is changing all the time and so I'm always considering whether there is a better way to strike the balance.". Talent suggests that moral concerns might be put to rest through a possible future scientific breakthrough - replicating embryonic stem cells without the use of cloned embryos.

Proposed Constitutional Amendment 2 would amend the state constitution and allow, in line with federal law, stem cell research and treatment. On May 1, 2006, Talent announced his opposition to the proposed ballot-initiative. Stem cell research and treatment is working up to be a divisive issue for many Republicans and is taking a particular prominence in Missouri. In the senate, he subsequently voted against expanding federal funds for embryonic stem cell research in July 2006.

==== Michael J. Fox commercial ====
Actor Michael J. Fox, who has Parkinson's disease, appeared in a television campaign commercial for Claire McCaskill in late October, and stated that Talent wanted to criminalize embryonic stem cell research. The commercial, which was one of many Fox had appeared in for politicians of both major political parties supportive of such research, made national headlines.

Rush Limbaugh, conservative radio talk show host, commented on the TV commercial, saying that Fox was "really shameless" and that he was "either off his medication or acting." Limbaugh speculated that Fox might have intentionally not taken his medication to exaggerate the effects of his illness, saying "He's moving all around and shaking, and it's purely an act." Limbaugh followed up on October 25, 2006, saying, "When you wade into political life you have every right to say what you want, but you cannot in turn argue that no one has the right to take you on."

Elaine Richman, a neuroscientist, stated, "Anyone who knows the disease well would regard his movement as classic severe Parkinson's disease. Any other interpretation is misinformed." On October 26, Fox responded to Limbaugh's claims, saying in an interview with Katie Couric, "The irony of it is that I was too medicated." He added that his condition during their interview reflected "a dearth of medication — not by design. I just take it, and it kicks in when it kicks in." He further laughed, "That's funny — the notion that you could calculate it for effect."

=== Fundraising ===
Talent had a huge cash-on-hand advantage over McCaskill. Because of the way FEC filing works, Talent's numbers include the money he raised during his 2002 special election campaign. Totals are through July 19.

Candidate	Funds raised	Cash on hand
Jim Talent (R)	$19,602,725	$6,921,577
Claire McCaskill (D)	$4,572,707	$2,684,766

=== Debates ===
- Complete video of debate, September 15, 2006
- Complete video of debate, October 8, 2006
- Complete video of debate, October 16, 2006
- Complete video of debate, October 18, 2006

=== Endorsements ===
Claire McCaskill (D)

Individuals

- Wesley Clark, general, 2004 democratic presidential candidate

Organizations

- National Women's Political Caucus

=== Predictions ===
Source	Ranking	As of
The Cook Political Report	Tossup	November 6, 2006
Sabato's Crystal Ball	Tilt D (flip)	November 6, 2006
Rothenberg Political Report	Lean D (flip)	November 6, 2006
Real Clear Politics	Tossup	November 6, 2006

=== Polling ===
A June 19–22, 2006 Research 2000 poll showed Talent's favorability rating was 47%-46%, with 7% having no opinion. Soon after, a St. Louis Post-Dispatch poll was released showing McCaskill with 49% favorability to Talent's 43%.

Source	Date	Claire McCaskill (D)	Jim Talent (R)	Frank Gilmour (L)
Rasmussen	September 1, 2005	46%	46%	
Rasmussen	November 9, 2005	47%	45%	
Rasmussen	January 2, 2006	46%	43%	
Research 2000	January 21, 2006	47%	44%	
Rasmussen	February 8, 2006	41%	46%	
Rasmussen	March 6, 2006	43%	40%	
Zogby/WSJ	March 31, 2006	45%	48%	
Rasmussen	April 4, 2006	42%	41%	
Rasmussen	May 8, 2006	40%	43%	
Zogby/WSJ	June 21, 2006	44%	49%	
Research 2000	June 24, 2006	49%	43%	
Rasmussen	June 27, 2006	42%	42%	
Rasmussen	July 20, 2006	45%	42%	
Zogby/WSJ	July 24, 2006	45%	49%	
Rasmussen	July 31, 2006	45%	42%	
SurveyUSA	August 15, 2006	47%	46%	2%
Rasmussen	August 15, 2006	44%	46%	
Zogby/WSJ	August 28, 2006	45%	50%	
Research 2000	September 1, 2006	47%	46%	2%
USA Today/Gallup	September 5, 2006	44%	50%	
Zogby/WSJ	September 11, 2006	45%	49%	
SurveyUSA	September 14, 2006	48%	47%	1%
Rasmussen	September 15, 2006	45%	42%	
Zogby/WSJ	September 28, 2006	45%	47%	
Mason-Dixon/MSNBC	October 2, 2006	43%	43%	
Reuters/Zogby	October 5, 2006	39%	43%	
USA Today/Gallup	October 5, 2006	48%	45%	
Rasmussen	October 7, 2006	44%	43%	
SurveyUSA	October 12, 2006	51%	42%	3%
Rasmussen	October 13, 2006	44%	45%	
Bennett, Petts & Blumenthal (D)	October 13, 2006	48%	43%	
Mason-Dixon/McClatchy-MSNBC	October 24, 2006	46%	43%	
SurveyUSA	October 24, 2006	45%	48%	2%
Los Angeles Times/Bloomberg	October 24, 2006	45%	48%	
Rasmussen	October 27, 2006	46%	48%	
Research 2000	October 28, 2006	47%	47%	2%
Rasmussen	October 30, 2006	48%	47%	
CNN/Opinion Research Corporation	October 31, 2006	49%	49%	
SurveyUSA	October 31, 2006	49%	46%	2%
Reuters/Zogby	November 2, 2006	46%	43%	6%
Rasmussen	November 2, 2006	49%	48%	
Mason-Dixon/MSNBC-McClatchy	November 3, 2006	46%	45%	
Rasmussen	November 5, 2006	48%	49%	
USA Today/Gallup	November 5, 2006	49%	45%	
SurveyUSA	November 5, 2006	51%	42%	4%
SurveyUSA	November 6, 2006	50%	44%	3%
Polimetrix	November 6, 2006	50%	50%	
OnPoint Polling and Research	November 6, 2006	49%	46%	

==== Polling and candidate positions ====
In single-issue polling, Talent's positions contradicted the majority of voters in the election on most issues: 66% of Missouri voters favored raising the minimum wage to $6.50 an hour; 62% of Missouri voters favored raising taxes to replace Medicaid funding cut by the current Republican Governor, Matt Blunt; 54% opposed a law that would require all Missourians to show a photo ID before they vote; 58% favored campaign donation limitations; and 66% favored restoring Medicaid coverage to about 90,000 Missourians who lost coverage when Blunt and the Republican legislature tightened eligibility requirements.

=== Results ===
When the polls closed in Missouri on election night the race was, as expected, too close to call. With 85% of the vote in and with still no call, McCaskill claimed victory. At the time McCaskill declared victory, she was ahead by a vote margin of 867,683 to Talent's 842,251 votes; in percentage terms, with 85% of the vote in, McCaskill led Talent, 49% to 48%. Finally, at 11:38 P.M. Central Time the Associated Press called McCaskill as the winner. St. Louis County, adjacent to St. Louis, and Jackson County, home of Kansas City, are probably what pushed McCaskill over the finish line.

General election results
Party	Candidate	Votes	%	±%
Democratic	Claire McCaskill	1,055,255	49.58%	+0.91%
Republican	Jim Talent (incumbent)	1,006,941	47.31%	−2.49%
Libertarian	Frank Gilmour	47,792	2.25%	+1.27%
Progressive Party	Lydia Lewis	18,383	0.86%	n/a
Write-in		88	0.00%	n/a
Total votes		2,128,459	100.0	n/a
Democratic gain from Republican				

==== Counties that flipped from Republican to Democratic ====
- Hickory (largest city: Hermitage)
- Platte (largest city: Kansas City)
- Carroll (largest city: Carrollton)
- Oregon (largest city: Thayer)

==== Counties that flipped from Democratic to Republican ====
- Bates (largest city: Butler)
- Lafayette (largest city: Odessa)
- Clark (largest city: Kahoka)
- Cass (largest city: Harrisonville)
- Schuyler (largest city: Lancaster)

== See also ==
- 2006 United States Senate elections
- 2006 United States House of Representatives elections
