= 2002 United States Senate special election in Missouri =

- November 5, 2002
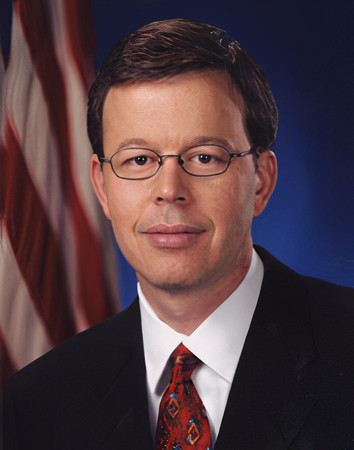

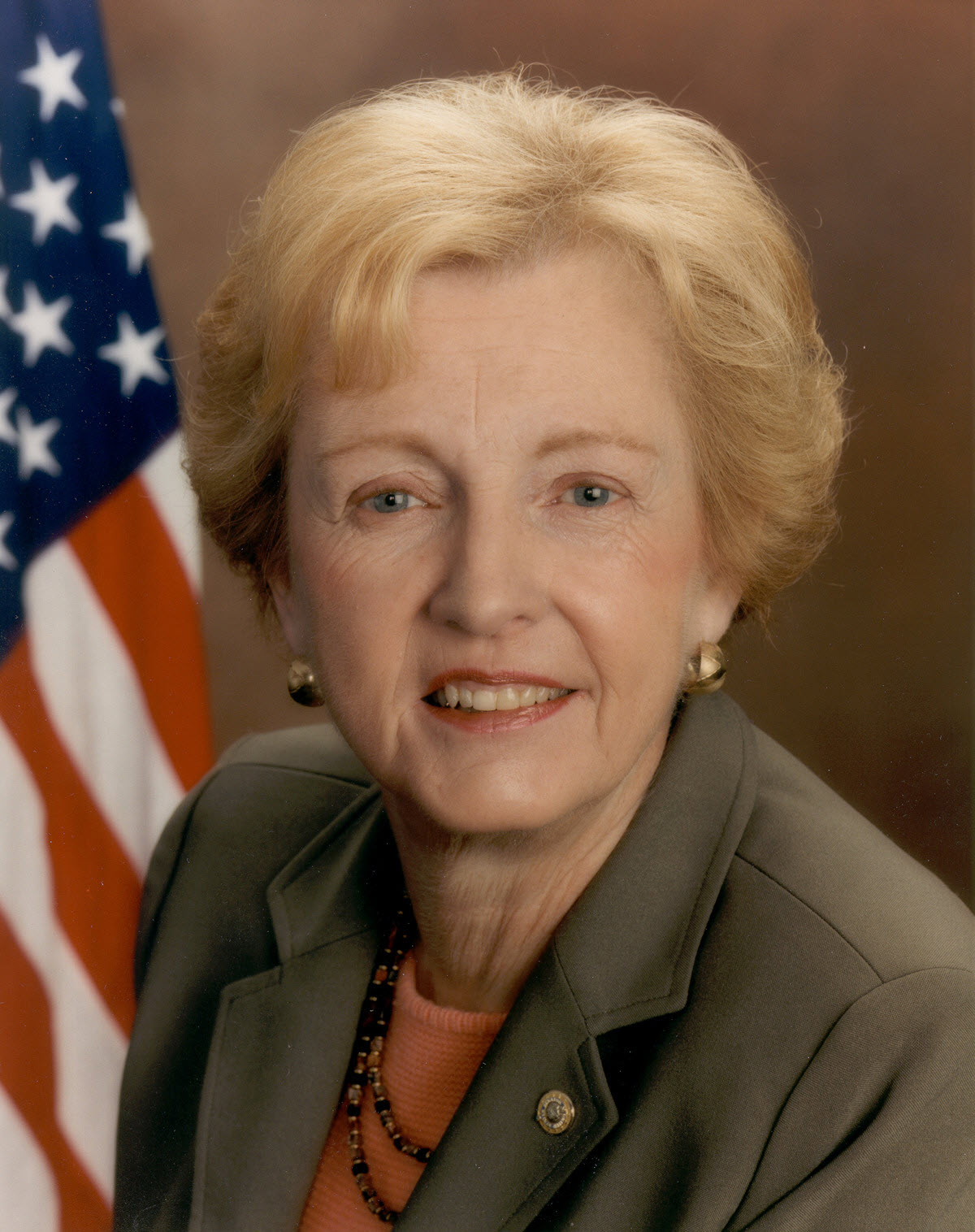
Nominee	Jim Talent	Jean Carnahan
Party	Republican	Democratic
Popular vote	935,032	913,778
Percentage	49.80%	48.67%
- County results Talent: 40–50% 50–60% 60–70% 70–80% Carnahan: 40–50% 50–60% 60–70% 70–80%
U.S. senator before election
Jean Carnahan (Note: In December 2000, Carnahan was appointed by Governor Roger B. Wilson to begin Mel Carnahan's six-year term, as he was killed in a plane crash and elected posthumously.)
Democratic
Elected U.S. Senator
Jim Talent
Republican

The 2002 United States Senate special election in Missouri was held on November 5, 2002, to decide who would serve the rest of Democrat Mel Carnahan's term, after he died while campaigning and posthumously won the 2000 election. The winner would serve the remainder of the term ending in 2007. Governor Roger Wilson appointed Carnahan's wife Jean, also a Democrat, to serve temporarily. She decided to run to serve the remainder of the term, but she was narrowly defeated by Republican nominee Jim Talent.

Technically, the race flipped control of the Senate from Democrats to Republicans, but the Senate had adjourned before Talent could take office, so no change in leadership occurred until the 108th Congress opened session on January 3, 2003. With a margin of 1.1%, this election was the second-closest race of the 2002 Senate election cycle, behind only the election in South Dakota.

This was one of the six Democratic-held Senate seats up for election in a state that George W. Bush won in the 2000 presidential election.

== Background ==
In the November 2000 elections, Democratic Governor of Missouri Mel Carnahan, who had died in a plane crash three weeks before, remained on the ballot for election to the U.S. Senate. Carnahan received more votes than his Republican opponent, incumbent Senator John Ashcroft, who did not legally contest being defeated by a dead candidate. Lieutenant Governor Roger B. Wilson ascended to serve the remaining three months of Carnahan's gubernatorial term, and promised to appoint Carnahan's widow in her husband's place should Carnahan posthumously defeat Ashcroft. Accordingly, Jean Carnahan was appointed to the Senate effective on January 3, 2001; a special election was scheduled in 2002 for the balance of Carnahan's Senate term.

The Seventeenth Amendment requires that appointments to the Senate last only until a special election is held.

== Democratic primary ==
=== Candidates ===
- Jean Carnahan, incumbent U.S. senator
- Darrel D. Day

=== Results ===
Democratic primary results
Party	Candidate	Votes	%
Democratic	Jean Carnahan (incumbent)	368,149	83.22
Democratic	Darrel D. Day	74,237	16.78
Total votes		442,386	100.00

== Republican primary ==
=== Candidates ===
- Scott Craig Babbitt
- Doris Bass Landfather, St. Louis alderman and perennial candidate
- Martin Lindstedt, perennial candidate
- Joseph A. May, dentist
- Jim Talent, former U.S. representative and nominee for governor in 2000

=== Results ===
Republican primary results
Party	Candidate	Votes	%
Republican	Jim Talent	395,994	89.58
Republican	Joseph A. May	18,525	4.19
Republican	Doris Bass Landfather	14,074	3.18
Republican	Scott Craig Babbitt	7,705	1.74
Republican	Martin Lindstedt	5,773	1.31
Total votes		442,071	100.00

== Libertarian primary ==
=== Candidates ===
- Edward Joseph Manley
- Tamara A. Millay, perennial candidate

=== Results ===
Libertarian primary results
Party	Candidate	Votes	%
Libertarian	Tamara A. Millay	1,942	59.35
Libertarian	Edward Joseph Manley	1,330	40.65
Total votes		3,272	100.00

== General election ==
=== Candidates ===
- Jean Carnahan (D), incumbent U.S. senator
- Tamara Millay (L), perennial candidate
- Daniel Romano (G)
- Jim Talent (R), former U.S. representative and nominee for governor in 2000

=== Campaign ===
National security and Carnahan's vote against fellow Missourian John Ashcroft as attorney general were major issues in the campaign. Republicans argued that Carnahan owed her vote to Ashcroft, who had lost his bid for re-election to the Senate to Carnahan's husband. Talent, citing Carnahan's votes against homeland-security legislation and missile defense, accused her of being soft on national security, which she objected to, saying he was "doubt[ing] her patriotism."

Jack Abramoff contributed $2,000 to Talent's 2002 senatorial campaign, and Preston Gates & Ellis, a former Abramoff employer, contributed $1,000 to Talent's campaign. Talent later returned both contributions. Talent's win returned Republican control of the Senate which had a small Democratic majority after Jim Jeffords left the Republican Party to become an Independent caucusing with Democrats.

Talent's victory was not certified until November 21, 2002, one day before Congress adjourned, which prevented them from claiming a Senate majority. He automatically became a senator the following day because, under federal law, he formally took office the day after both chambers of Congress adjourned. Because Republicans would hold the majority in the following Congress, they saw no need to hold a special session in the 107th to take advantage of their brief majority.

=== Predictions ===
Source	Ranking	As of
Sabato's Crystal Ball	Lean R (flip)	November 4, 2002

=== Polling ===
Poll source	Date(s) administered	Sample size (Note: Key: A – all adults RV – registered voters LV – likely voters V – unclear)	Margin of error	Jean Carnahan (D)	Jim Talent (R)	Other / Undecided
SurveyUSA	October 31 – November 3, 2002	958 (LV)	± 3.3%	49%	47%	4%

=== Results ===
Carnahan only won 26 counties and the independent city of St. Louis out of the state's 114 counties. She kept the race close by running up margins in St. Louis and in Jackson County home of Kansas City, though her victory in St. Louis County was a close one. Ultimately Talent was able to win the seat by running up decent margins in rural areas of the state.

General election results
Party	Candidate	Votes	%	±%
Republican	Jim Talent	935,032	49.80%	+1.41%
Democratic	Jean Carnahan (incumbent)	913,778	48.67%	−1.80%
Libertarian	Tamara A. Millay	18,345	0.98%	+0.55%
Green	Daniel Romano	10,465	0.56%	+0.11%
Majority		21,254	1.13%	−0.94%
Turnout		1,877,620		
Republican gain from Democratic		Swing		

==== Counties that flipped from Republican to Democratic ====
- Schuyler (largest city: Lancaster)
- Bates (largest city: Butler)
- Shannon (largest city: Winona)
- Washington (largest city: Potosi)

==== Counties that flipped from Democratic to Republican ====
- Dunklin (largest city: Kennett)
- Callaway (largest city: Fulton)
- Howard (largest city: Fayette)
- Randolph (largest city: Moberly)

== See also ==
- 2002 United States Senate elections
