= 2006 Missouri Amendment 2 =

Referendum on stem cell research and cloning

Constitutional Amendment 2
- November 7, 2006
- The Missouri Stem Cell Research and Cures Initiative

Results
Choice	Votes	%
Yes	1,085,396	51.20%
No	1,034,596	48.80%
Valid votes	2,119,992	100.00%
Invalid or blank votes	0	0.00%
Total votes	2,119,992	100.00%
County results
Yes
50–60%
60–70%
No
50–60%
60–70%
70–80%

Missouri Constitutional Amendment 2 (The Missouri Stem Cell Research and Cures Initiative) was a state constitutional amendment initiative that concerned stem cell research and human cloning. It allows any stem cell research and therapy in the U.S. state of Missouri that is legal under federal law, including somatic cell nuclear transfer to produce human embryos for stem cell production. It prohibits cloning or attempting to clone a human being, which is defined to mean "to implant in a uterus or attempt to implant in a uterus anything other than the product of fertilization of an egg of a human female by a sperm of a human male for the purpose of initiating a pregnancy that could result in the creation of a human fetus, or the birth of a human being". Commercials supporting and opposing the amendment aired during the 2006 World Series, in which the St. Louis Cardinals participated. The issue became especially intertwined with the 2006 U.S. Senate election in Missouri, with the Republican and Democratic candidates on opposite sides of the issue.

Missouri Constitutional Amendment 2 appeared on the ballot for the November 2006 general election and passed with 51% of the vote.

== Support ==
The organization that led the movement to get the initiative on the ballot and later supported its adoption was called the Missouri Coalition for Lifesaving Cures. The measure was proposed to stop repeated attempts by the Missouri Legislature to ban certain types of stem cell research, namely SCNT. Claire McCaskill, the Democratic nominee for U.S. Senate, supported the measure.

During the 2006 World Series, which was partially held in St. Louis, a television ad featuring actor Michael J. Fox aired. The ad was paid for by McCaskill's campaign, and the primary reason Fox gave for his support for McCaskill was her stance in favor of stem cell research. The advertisement was controversial because Fox was visibly suffering tremors, which were side effects of the medications used to treat Parkinson's Syndrome. Rush Limbaugh, a conservative radio host and Missouri native, criticized Fox for allowing himself to have been used by special interests supporting the measure. Limbaugh criticized the uncontrollable movements that Fox made in the commercial, and claimed that it was Fox had either deliberately stopped taking his medication or was feigning his tremors.

== Opposition ==
The coalition that initially led the opposition to the amendment was called Missourians Against Human Cloning. Later in the effort, when the coalition was unable to raise the money for the "Vote No" ads, Life Communications Fund took the lead in doing so. They created a series of "Vote No" ads for television, radio and print. Earlier in the campaign, the Vitae Foundation ran a series of educational ads, a "prophetic voice campaign," on the differences between adult and embryonic stem cell research, which was a major gain for those opposed to the Amendment, because, according to them, the "cures" were only occurring as a result of adult stem cell treatments, not via embryonic stem cells. Drawing awareness to the differences between adult and embryonic stem cell research was critical to their strategy. That was the goal of the first ad created in the series. Each ad then slowly moved the target audience (Catholics, Protestants and Evangelicals) to oppose the amendment. The final ad attempted to link embryonic stem cell research to human cloning. A majority of Missourians were opposed to human cloning, especially their target audience. The prophetic voice campaign ran for about 6 months. The "Vote No" ads ran for roughly 3 months. Jim Talent, the incumbent Republican U.S. Senator facing re-election, was one of several candidates opposed to the amendment.

In rebuttal to the Michael J. Fox advertisement (which never directly mentioned Amendment 2), a Life Communications television ad with several celebrities appeared in opposition to the measure. At least three of the celebrities opposed the measure for religious reasons: Kurt Warner, former St. Louis Rams quarterback; Kansas City Royals baseball player Mike Sweeney, and Jim Caviezel, who played Jesus in The Passion of the Christ. Patricia Heaton, from Everybody Loves Raymond, opposed the amendment on the grounds that low-income women would be exploited for their eggs. Jeff Suppan, a pitcher for the St. Louis Cardinals, also appeared in opposition to the amendment.

== Polling ==
As election day drew near, public support seemed to be shifting away from Amendment 2. Polls had shown support as high as 68% in favor of the Amendment in December 2005. By October 29, 2006, support had fallen to 51%, with 35% opposed.

== Results and aftermath ==
Missouri Constitutional Amendment 2
Choice	Votes	%
For	1,085,396	51.20
Against	1,034,596	48.80
Total	2,119,992	100.00

On November 7, 2006, Amendment 2 passed by a margin of 2.4% (or 50,800 votes). The final tally of votes ended in 51.2% for yes and 48.8% for no. The measure failed in 97 of the 114 counties in the state, but picked up enough votes in St. Louis, Kansas City, and Columbia (and their surrounding counties) to pass statewide.

Democrat Claire McCaskill (an amendment supporter) unseated Republican incumbent U.S. Senator Jim Talent (an amendment opponent) the same night that the amendment passed.

The campaigns in support and against the amendment broke many records on political spending in Missouri statewide elections.

Following the passage of the amendment, the Stowers Institute for Medical Research canceled plans for a major expansion in Kansas City. Because of the very close vote, the Institute asserted that the political climate in Missouri was too hostile for investment in stem cell research.
