= 1986 Missouri State Auditor election =

- November 4, 1986
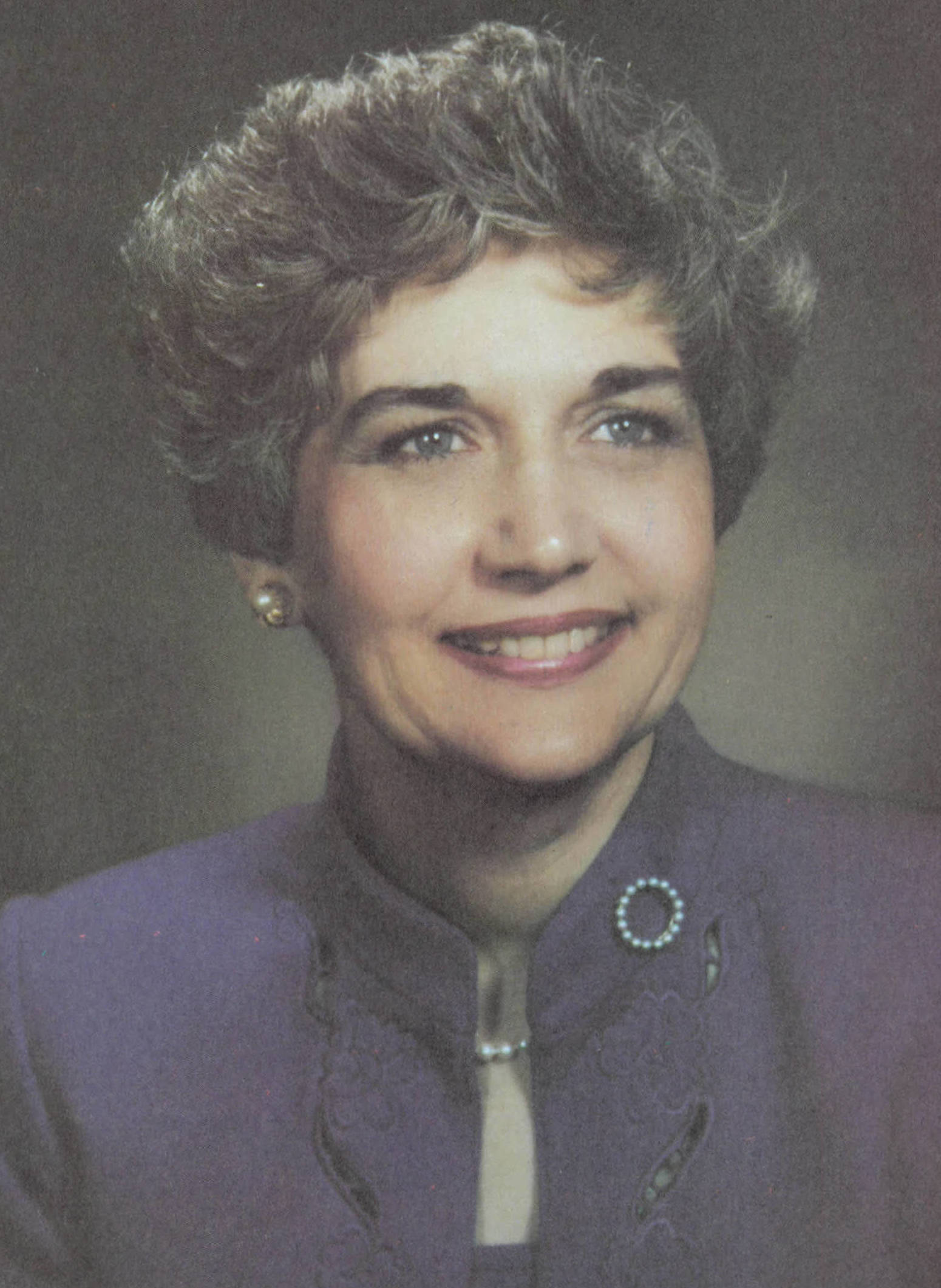

| Nominee | Margaret B. Kelly | Travis Morrison |
| Party | Republican | Democratic |
| Popular vote | 741,697 | 706,299 |
| Percentage | 51.22% | 48.78% |
State Auditor before election
Margaret B. Kelly (Acting)
Republican
Elected State Auditor
Margaret B. Kelly
Republican

The 1986 Missouri State Auditor election was held on November 4, 1986, in order to elect the state auditor of Missouri. Republican nominee and incumbent acting state auditor Margaret B. Kelly defeated Democratic nominee Travis Morrison.

== General election ==
On election day, November 4, 1986, Republican nominee Margaret B. Kelly won the election by a margin of 35,398 votes against her opponent Democratic nominee Travis Morrison, thereby retaining Republican control over the office of state auditor. Kelly was sworn in for her first full term on January 12, 1987.

=== Results ===
Missouri State Auditor election, 1986
| Party | Candidate | Votes | % |
|---|---|---|---|
| Republican | Margaret B. Kelly (incumbent) | 741,697 | 51.22 |
| Democratic | Travis Morrison | 706,299 | 48.78 |
| Total votes | | 1,447,996 | 100.00 |
| Republican hold | | | |
