= 1990 Missouri State Auditor election =

- November 6, 1990
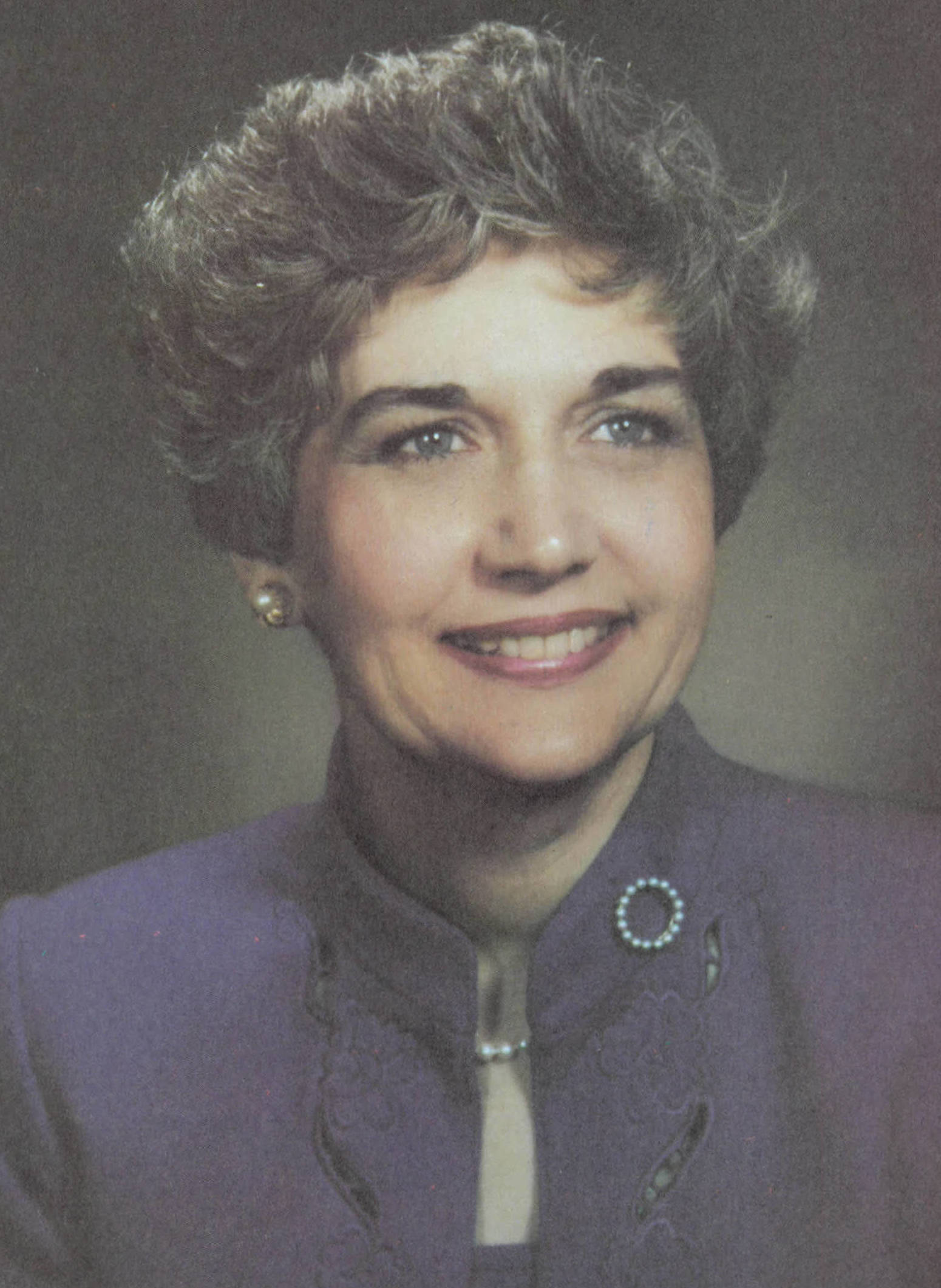

Nominee	Margaret B. Kelly	Connie B. Hendren
Party	Republican	Democratic
Popular vote	743,012	581,172
Percentage	56.11%	43.89%
- County results Kelly: 50–60% 60–70% 70–80% Hendren: 50–60% 60–70%
State Auditor before election
Margaret B. Kelly
Republican
Elected State Auditor
Margaret B. Kelly
Republican

The 1990 Missouri State Auditor election was held on November 6, 1990, in order to elect the state auditor of Missouri. Republican nominee and incumbent state auditor Margaret B. Kelly defeated Democratic nominee Connie B. Hendren.

== General election ==
On election day, November 6, 1990, Republican nominee Margaret B. Kelly won re-election by a margin of 161,840 votes against her opponent Democratic nominee Connie B. Hendren, thereby retaining Republican control over the office of state auditor. Kelly was sworn in for her second term on January 14, 1991.

=== Results ===
Missouri State Auditor election, 1990
Party	Candidate	Votes	%
Republican	Margaret B. Kelly (incumbent)	743,012	56.11
Democratic	Connie B. Hendren	581,172	43.89
Total votes		1,324,184	100.00
Republican hold			
