= Robert A. Young =

American politician (1923–2007)

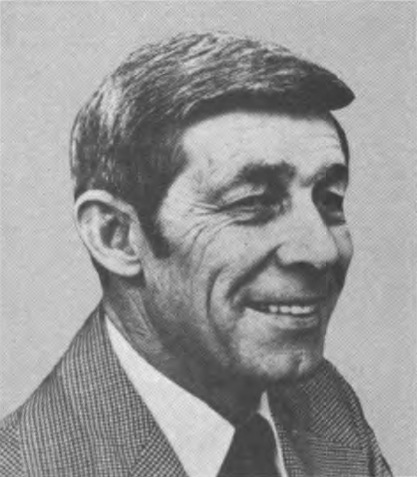

Member of the U.S. House of Representatives from Missouri's 2nd district
- In office January 3, 1977 – January 3, 1987
- Preceded by: James W. Symington
- Succeeded by: Jack Buechner

Member of the Missouri Senate
- In office 1962-1976

Member of the Missouri House of Representatives
- In office 1956-1962

Personal details
- Born: November 27, 1923 St. Louis, Missouri, U.S.
- Died: October 17, 2007 (aged 83) St. Ann, Missouri, U.S.
- Party: Democratic
- Spouse: Irene Slawson

Robert Anton Young III (November 27, 1923 – October 17, 2007) was a Democratic politician from the state of Missouri who served five terms in the US House of Representatives.

== Education and family background ==
Young was the oldest child in a family that grew to include nine children. He was educated in parochial schools in St. Louis County. He attended McBride High School and graduated from Normandy High School in 1941. Young was a union pipefitter by trade, a member of Pipefitters and Plumbers Local 562, AFL-CIO, St. Louis, until his election to Congress in 1976.

He married Irene Slawson on November 27, 1947, and they were married for fifty years, until her death in 1997. Their family includes three children.

== Military service ==
Young served in the U.S. Army from February 1943 to November 1945. His unit landed "under fire" on Utah Beach, on D-Day, June 6, 1944. He then served in General George Patton's 3rd Army in the Battle of the Bulge. He was awarded the Bronze Star for valor in combat, the African-European Campaign Medal with Five Battlestars, the Combat Infantryman Badge, and the French Croix-de-Guerre with Palm for D-Day.

== Political career ==
Young's long political career began in 1952 with his election as Democratic Committeeman for Airport Township in St. Louis County, an office he held until 1977. He was elected to the Missouri House of Representatives in 1956 and served there for 6 years. In 1962, he was elected to the Missouri Senate, and served for 14 years.

During his years in the State Legislature, Young supported legislation that created the St. Louis Junior College District and helped establish the University of Missouri–St. Louis. The St. Louis Globe-Democrat awarded him its Award for Meritious Service to his state three times, 1972, 1974, and 1976.

In 1976, Young was elected to the United States House of Representatives representing the Second Congressional District of Missouri. As a member of Congress, he served on several key committees including Public Works and Transportation, Aviation, Water Resources, and Science and Technology.

Young was reelected without serious difficulty in 1978 and 1980. However, after the 1980 census, Young's district was significantly altered as a result of Missouri losing a congressional district. He lost his share of St. Louis, and was instead pushed into more conservative territory to the west. Although he took 56 percent in 1982, he was nearly defeated by Republican State Representative Jack Buechner in 1984 as Ronald Reagan took almost 60 percent of the vote in his district. Young faced Buechner again in 1986, and this time lost by 7,400 votes.

Young was a strong proponent of public works projects to benefit his district and the state of Missouri. The St. Louis Construction News and Review and Pride, Inc. named Young "Construction Industry Man of the Year" in 1981. Among the projects he supported were landscaping the Gateway Arch, renovation of the Old Post Office, the creation of the light-rail mass transit MetroLink system, the construction of the Thomas F. Eagleton Federal Courthouse, the expansion of Lambert Airport, and the new Lock and Dam 26 at Alton, Illinois.

== Retirement ==
After his retirement from public office, Young remained active and involved in community affairs. He was a life member of Amvets, VFW, and was an active member of American Legion Post 338 in Overland, Missouri. He also served on the Board of the James S. McDonnell USO and was a member of the St. Louis Airport Commission.

== Awards and honors ==

In 1988, President Ronald Reagan designated the federal building in downtown St. Louis as the Robert A. Young Federal Building in Young's honor. Originally named the St. Louis Mart and Terminal Warehouse, the Art Deco building at 1222 Spruce Street was designed by Preston J. Bradshaw and completed in 1933. The building was transferred to the United States Army in 1941. In 1961 it was acquired by the General Services Administration and used to accommodate federal agency offices. It is listed in the National Register of Historic Places.

Other awards and honors Young has received include the following:

- The John H. Poelker Transportation Progress Award by the RCGA Board of Directors
- Honorary Doctor of Humanities from the Logan School of Chiropractic
- The "Able Helmsman" of the Year by the Greater St. Louis Port Council
- Dean's Award from the University of Missouri, St. Louis
- St. Louis County Historical Society "Father Faherty" Award, 1992
- Thomas Jefferson Award from the St. Louis County Democrats, 2001

== Death ==
Young died on October 17, 2007, due to liver disease.

U.S. House of Representatives
Preceded by James W. Symington	Member of the U.S. House of Representatives from Missouri's 2nd congressional district 1977–1987	Succeeded by Jack Buechner
