= 2000 Missouri gubernatorial election =

- November 7, 2000
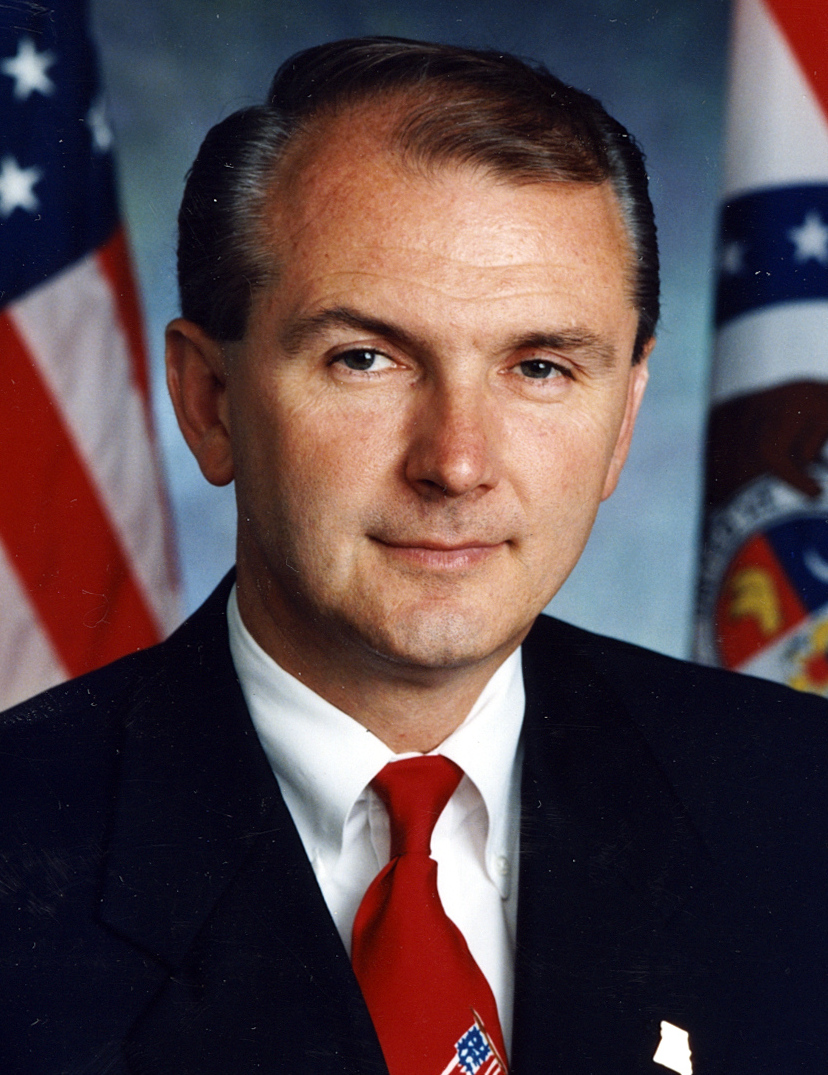

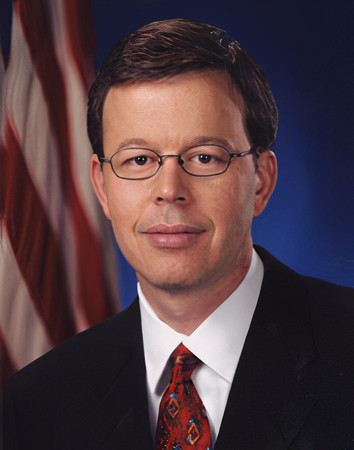
Nominee	Bob Holden	Jim Talent
Party	Democratic	Republican
Popular vote	1,152,752	1,131,307
Percentage	49.12%	48.21%
- County results Holden: 40–50% 50–60% 60–70% 70–80% Talent: 40–50% 50–60% 60–70% 70–80%
Governor before election
Roger B. Wilson
Democratic
Elected Governor
Bob Holden
Democratic

The 2000 Missouri gubernatorial election was held on November 7, 2000. Democratic incumbent Mel Carnahan was term-limited and ran for the U.S. Senate. In the open race, Democratic treasurer Bob Holden narrowly defeated U.S. representative Jim Talent.

Holden won the Democratic nomination unopposed, while Talent easily defeated nominal opposition. In the general election, Holden narrowly defeated Talent, winning 49 percent of the vote to Talent's 48 percent.

== Democratic primary ==
=== Candidates ===
- Bob Holden, Missouri state treasurer

=== Results ===
Democratic primary results
Party	Candidate	Votes	%
Democratic	Bob Holden	362,457	100.00%
Total votes		362,457	100.00%

== Republican primary ==
=== Candidates ===
- Jim Talent, U.S. representative from Chesterfield
- Jen Sievers, investor
- Elgar Macy, U.S. Navy veteran

=== Results ===
Republican primary results
Party	Candidate	Votes	%
Republican	Jim Talent	296,159	84.49%
Republican	Jen Sievers	33,674	9.61%
Republican	Elgar Macy	20,681	5.90%
Total votes		350,514	100.00%

== Libertarian primary ==
=== Candidates ===
- John M. Swenson, retiree
- Dick Illyes, businessman

=== Results ===
Libertarian primary results
Party	Candidate	Votes	%
Libertarian	John M. Swenson	1,032	60.35%
Libertarian	Dick Illyes	678	39.65%
Total votes		1,710	100.00%

== Constitution primary ==
=== Candidates ===
- Richard L. Smith, truck driver

=== Results ===
Constitution primary results
Party	Candidate	Votes	%
Constitution	Richard L. Smith	299	100.00%
Total votes		299	100.00%

== Reform primary ==
=== Candidates ===
- Richard Allen Kline, retiree
- Joseph C. Keller, physician
- Kent A. Benson, developer

=== Results ===
Reform primary results
Party	Candidate	Votes	%
Reform	Richard Allen Kline	317	42.78%
Reform	Joseph C. Keller	231	31.17%
Reform	Kent A. Benson	193	26.05%
Total votes		741	100.00%

== General election ==
=== Candidates ===
- Bob Holden, Missouri state treasurer (Democratic)
- Richard Allen Kline, retiree (Reform)
- Lavoy Reed (Green)
- Larry Rice (Independent)
- Richard L. Smith (Constitution)
- John M. Swenson, retiree (Libertarian)
- Jim Talent, U.S. representative from Chesterfield (Republican)

=== Polling ===
Poll source	Date(s)	Sample size	Margin of error	Jim Talent (R)	Bob Holden (D)	Other / undecided (Note: Calculated by taking the difference of 100% and all other candidates combined.)
Zogby Analytics	November 5, 2000	597	—	44%	45%	11%
Harris Insights & Analytics	November 3, 2000	5,830	—	49%	47%	4%
Zogby Analytics	November 2, 2000	600	—	42%	43%	15%
Zogby Analytics	October 30, 2000	600	—	45%	41%	14%
Zogby Analytics	October 27, 2000	600	—	41%	43%	16%
Zogby Analytics	October 25, 2000	603	—	40%	41%	19%
Mason-Dixon Polling & Strategy	October 24, 2000	625	—	43%	45%	12%
Rasmussen Reports	October 23, 2000	1,072	—	46%	44%	10%

=== Results ===
2000 Missouri gubernatorial election
Party	Candidate	Votes	%	±%
Democratic	Bob Holden	1,152,752	49.12%	−8.05%
Republican	Jim Talent	1,131,307	48.21%	+7.77%
Independent	Larry Rice	34,431	1.47%	
Libertarian	John M. Swenson	11,274	0.48%	−1.92%
Green	Lavoy Reed	9,008	0.38%	
Reform	Richard Allen Kline	4,916	0.21%	
Constitution	Richard L. Smith	3,142	0.13%	
Majority		21,445	0.91%	−15.82%
Total votes		2,346,830	100.00%	
Democratic hold				

=== Counties that flipped from Democratic to Republican ===
- Audrain (largest city: Mexico)
- Bates (largest city: Butler)
- Chariton (largest city: Salisbury)
- Clark (largest city: Kahoka)
- Clinton (largest city: Cameron)
- Daviess (largest city: Gallatin)
- Dunklin (largest city: Kennett)
- Franklin (largest city: Washington)
- Gentry (largest city: Albany)
- Grundy (largest city: Trenton)
- Henry (largest city: Clinton)
- Hickory (largest city: Hermitage)
- Howard (largest city: Fayette)
- Iron (largest city: Ironton)
- Knox (largest city: Edina)
- Lafayette (largest city: Odessa)
- Lewis (largest city: Canton)
- Linn (largest city: Brookfield)
- Livingston (largest city: Chillicothe)
- Madison (largest city: Fredericktown)
- Nodaway (largest city: Maryville)
- Pike (largest city: Bowling Green)
- Reynolds (largest city: Ellington)
- Schuyler (largest city: Lancaster)
- Scotland (largest city: Memphis)
- Scott (largest city: Sikeston)
- Shannon (largest city: Winona)
- St. Francois (largest city: Farmington)
- Sullivan (largest city: Milan)
- Wayne (largest city: Piedmont)
- Worth (largest city: Grant City)
- Buchanan (largest city: St. Joseph)
- Clay (largest city: Liberty)
- Jefferson (largest city: Arnold)
- Mississippi (largest city: Charleston)
- New Madrid (largest city: New Madrid)
- Pemiscot (largest city: Caruthersville)
- Ray (largest city: Richmond)
- Saline (largest city: Marshall)
- Washington (largest city: Potosi)
- Iron (largest city: Ironton)
- Sainte Genevieve (largest city: Ste. Genevieve)
- Platte (largest city: Kansas City)
- Pettis (largest city: Sedalia)
- Pulaski (largest city: Fort Leonard Wood)
- Adair (largest city: Kirksville)
- Andrew (largest city: Savannah)
- Cass (largest city: Harrisonville)
- Johnson (largest city: Warrensburg)
- Caldwell (largest city: Hamilton)
- Callaway (largest city: Fulton)
- Carroll (largest city: Carrollton)
- DeKalb (largest city: Cameron)
- Oregon (largest city: Thayer)
- Ralls (largest city: Hannibal)
- Randolph (largest city: Moberly)
- Ripley (largest city: Doniphan)
- Marion (largest city: Hannibal)
- Mercer (largest city: Princeton)
- Monroe (largest city: Monroe City)
- Montgomery (largest city: Montgomery City)
- Macon (largest city: Macon)
- St. Clair (largest city: Appleton City)
- Vernon (largest city: Nevada)
- Benton (largest city: Warsaw)
- Crawford (largest city: Cuba)
- Scott (largest city: Sikeston)
- Carter (largest city: Van Buren)
- Maries (largest city: Belle)
- Morgan (largest city: Versailles)
- Atchison (largest city: Tarkio)
- Dent (largest city: Salem)
- Phelps (largest city: Rolla)
- Bollinger (largest city: Marble Hill)
- Butler (largest city: Poplar Bluff)
- Cole (largest city: Jefferson City)
- Cooper (largest city: Boonville)
- Harrison (largest city: Bethany)
- Holt (largest city: Mound City)
- Osage (largest city: Linn)
- Perry (largest city: Perryville)
- Putnam (largest city: Unionville)
- Miller (largest city: Eldon)
- Moniteau (largest city: California)
- Shelby (largest city: Shelbina)
- Stoddard (largest city: Dexter)
