= Missouri Employers Mutual =

- Company type: Mutual
- Industry: Insurance
- Founded: March 1, 1995
- Headquarters: Columbia, Missouri, USA
- Key people: James (Jim) C. Owen, President & CEO
- Number of employees: 300
- Website: www.mem-ins.com

Missouri Employers Mutual Insurance is a workers' compensation provider in Missouri. MEM provides coverage in nearly all 600 National Council on Compensation Insurance (NCCI) classes. MEM is the largest Workers Compensation Insurance company in Missouri with 22.77% of the market share in 2021.

== History ==
The Missouri Employers Mutual Insurance Company was created in 1993 "as an independent public corporation for the purpose of insuring Missouri employers against liability for workers' compensation, occupational disease and employers' liability coverage."

In 2012 a bill was filed over MEM's tax exempt status as a state sponsored entity.

"In 2021, a bill to privatize the company was introduced but did not receive a hearing."

Headquartered in Columbia, Missouri, MEM has offices in Kansas City, Missouri, Springfield, Missouri, and St. Louis, Missouri. MEM has more than 17,000 insureds, and holds an A. M. Best rating of A− (excellent).

In the year 2021, the company disbursed dividends amounting to $7 million to its shareholders. Additionally, it reported a net shareholder equity of $273.6 million during the same period.

== Scandals ==
=== Money-laundering scheme ===
Roger B. Wilson was previously elected as the 44th lieutenant governor of Missouri, and briefly served as Governor after his predecessor, Mel Carnahan, was killed in a plane crash. After his short tenure as CEO of Missouri Employers Mutual, a publication reported he was "ousted" from that role but did not elaborate. Several months later, another article provided clarification regarding the circumstances surrounding his "mysterious" departure.

On April 10, 2012, Wilson was indicted by the U.S. Attorney's Office for misappropriation of insurance funds. As MEM maintained a federal tax exemption under the 501(c)(27) program, it was prohibited from making political contributions. In concert with Saint Louis area attorney Edward J. Griesedieck III, Wilson circumvented that rule on two occasions.

Their scheme was allegedly carried out at the behest of MEM board member Douglas Morgan; it involved Griesedieck making a $5,000 campaign donation to the Missouri Democratic Party via his employer, Herzog Crebs Law Firm. The ruse entailed Griesedieck's firm recouping those funds through falsely billing MEM for legal fees. Despite knowing that $5,000 portion of the bill was not for services rendered, Wilson approved their invoice; payment was tendered on October 8, 2009.

A couple of months later, Morgan and Wilson made another illegal $3,000 donation to the Missouri Democratic Party through Griesedieck. In August 2010, general counsel for MEM found their expenditure during a routine review, and questioned its propriety. As a result, Wilson elected to reimburse Herzog Crebs Law Firm through his own personal funds. However, he did not do the same for their previous $5,000 donation; Wilson plead guilty to the criminal charge during his arraignment before Chief U.S. Magistrate Judge Mary Ann Medler.
