= Jim Talent =

American politician (born 1956)

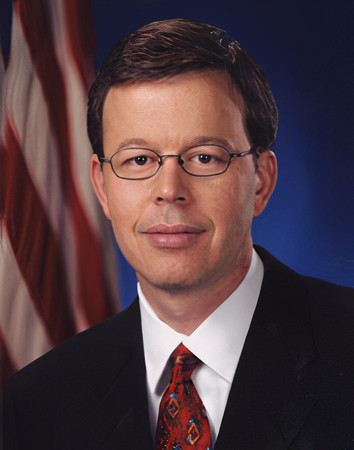
- Official portrait, c. 2002-2006

United States Senator from Missouri
- In office November 23, 2002 – January 3, 2007
- Preceded by: Jean Carnahan
- Succeeded by: Claire McCaskill

Chair of the House Small Business Committee
- In office January 3, 1997 – January 3, 2001
- Preceded by: Jan Meyers
- Succeeded by: Don Manzullo

Member of the U.S. House of Representatives from Missouri's 2nd district
- In office January 3, 1993 – January 3, 2001
- Preceded by: Joan Horn
- Succeeded by: Todd Akin

Member of the Missouri House of Representatives from the 92nd district
- In office January 9, 1985 – January 6, 1993
- Preceded by: Donna Ann Coleman
- Succeeded by: David Klarich

Personal details
- Born: James Matthes Talent; October 18, 1956 (age 70) Des Peres, Missouri, U.S.
- Party: Republican
- Spouse: Brenda Lee Lyons (m. 1984)
- Children: 3
- Education: Washington University (BA); University of Chicago (JD)
- Talent's voice Talent on legislation to fund sickle cell disease research and treatment. Recorded February 24, 2004

James Matthes Talent (born October 18, 1956) is an American politician who was a U.S. senator from Missouri from 2002 to 2007. He is a member of the Republican Party.

After serving for eight years in the U.S. House of Representatives and then working as a lobbyist, he ran for Governor of Missouri in 2000, losing to Democrat Bob Holden. Two years later, he was elected to the U.S. Senate, defeating Democrat Jean Carnahan in a special election to complete the term to which Carnahan's husband, Mel, had been elected posthumously in 2000. In the Democratic wave of November 2006, Talent lost his re-election bid to Claire McCaskill, 50% to 47%.

Talent, a senior adviser to Mitt Romney's 2008 presidential campaign, served as a member of Romney's 2012 economic policy team during the 2012 U.S. presidential campaign. Talent is a distinguished fellow at The Heritage Foundation and a member of the Defense Policy Board. He is also a co-chairman at Mercury, a Washington D.C. lobbying firm. Following Donald Trump's victory in the 2016 presidential election, Talent was rumored to be on the short list for United States Secretary of Defense, a position ultimately offered to James Mattis.

== Early life and education ==
Talent grew up in Des Peres, Missouri, a suburb of St. Louis. His father, Milton Oscar Talent, was the son of Russian Jewish immigrants, and was the first in his family to go to college, graduating from Harvard Law School and becoming a successful lawyer. Talent's mother, Marie Frieda (née Matthes), was an independent court reporter who was raised on a small farm near DeSoto, Missouri. She was from a Christian background; her German ancestors had settled in Jefferson County, Missouri beginning in 1832.

Talent graduated from Kirkwood High School in Kirkwood, Missouri, in 1973. He earned his B.A. in political science from Washington University in St. Louis, graduating with the Arnold J. Lien Prize as the most outstanding undergraduate in political science. Talent graduated Order of the Coif from the University of Chicago Law School, receiving his J.D. in 1981. Following law school, he served as a law clerk to Judge Richard A. Posner of the U.S. Court of Appeals for the Seventh Circuit. Before winning political office Talent served as an adjunct professor at the Washington University School of Law. He married Brenda Lee Lyons in 1984. The Talents have three children.

Talent's interfaith family did not attend religious services, and later in life Talent became a member of the Presbyterian Church in America. He was inspired to become a Christian while listening to one of Luis Palau's radio broadcasts in his car. He pulled over and accepted Jesus Christ into his life then. He refers to it as the moment he "passed from death to life."

== Political career ==
Talent began his political career in 1984 when he was elected to the Missouri House of Representatives. He served four terms there, the last two as minority leader.

=== House of Representatives ===
In the 1992 House of Representatives election, Talent defeated Bert Walker, the cousin of then-president George H. W. Bush and won the Republican nomination for the state's 2nd Congressional District, based in St. Louis's western suburbs. He went on to defeat Democratic incumbent Joan Kelly Horn in the general election, despite being heavily outspent.

The district had been altered after the 1990 census to preserve large Democratic majorities in the neighboring 1st District of Bill Clay and 3rd District of Dick Gephardt. Horn had appealed for a new map, even asking for a share of St. Louis, but was rebuffed by Clay and Gephardt.

Although Talent won narrowly in 1992, he never had another close race in what became a solidly Republican district. The only challenge he faced came in the 1996 House election, when Horn sought a rematch. Even though popular Democratic Governor Mel Carnahan won the district in his concurrent election, Talent won the rematch with 61% of the vote.

As a freshman in Congress, Talent authored and introduced the Welfare Reform Act of 1994, which was the precursor to the Personal Responsibility and Work Opportunity Act. Talent served as chairman of the Small Business Committee from 1997 to 2001.

==== Committee assignments ====
- House Small Business Committee, chair (1997–2001)
- House Armed Services Committee
- House Education and the Workforce Committee

=== 2000 Missouri gubernatorial election ===
Talent did not seek re-election to Congress in 2000, instead running for governor. He was narrowly defeated by Democratic state Treasurer Bob Holden, 49.1% to 48.2%.

=== Work as a lobbyist ===
For ten months in 2001, Talent worked for Washington lobbying firm Arent Fox, During this time, Talent was not allowed to directly lobby Congress, and he was not licensed to practice law in Washington, leading some Democratic opponents to accuse the lobbying firm of using his appointment as an illegal conduit to donate toward his upcoming Senate race. Arent Fox said the idea that Talent was not paid for genuine work was "absurd", but that "Talent's Republican ties did play a role in his hiring."

=== U.S. Senate ===
==== 2002 election ====
In the November 2000 elections, Mel Carnahan, who had died in a plane crash three weeks before, remained on the ballot for election to the Senate. Missouri election law would not allow for Carnahan's name to be removed from the November ballot. Carnahan received more votes than his Republican opponent, incumbent senator (and later United States Attorney General) John Ashcroft. Lieutenant Governor Roger Wilson, as he had promised before the election, appointed Carnahan's widow, Jean, in her husband's place.

The Seventeenth Amendment requires that appointments to the Senate last only until a special election is held. Talent, who received the Republican nomination, narrowly defeated Jean Carnahan in the November 2002 election, 49.8% to 48.7%. He was sworn in later that month to fill out the balance of Mel Carnahan's term.

Jack Abramoff contributed $2,000 to Talent's 2002 senatorial campaign and Preston Gates & Ellis, a former Abramoff employer, had also contributed $1,000 to Talent's campaign. Talent later returned both contributions.

Talent was criticized for not returning the money received from Americans for a Republican Majority (ARMPAC), a PAC formed by Tom DeLay. DeLay was facing charges of money laundering and violation of campaign finance laws. A spokesman for Talent has stated that Talent had not yet made a decision about whether or not to return the ARMPAC contribution, stating "Senator Talent is not ready to presume guilt or innocence and wants to give the judicial process a chance to move forward."

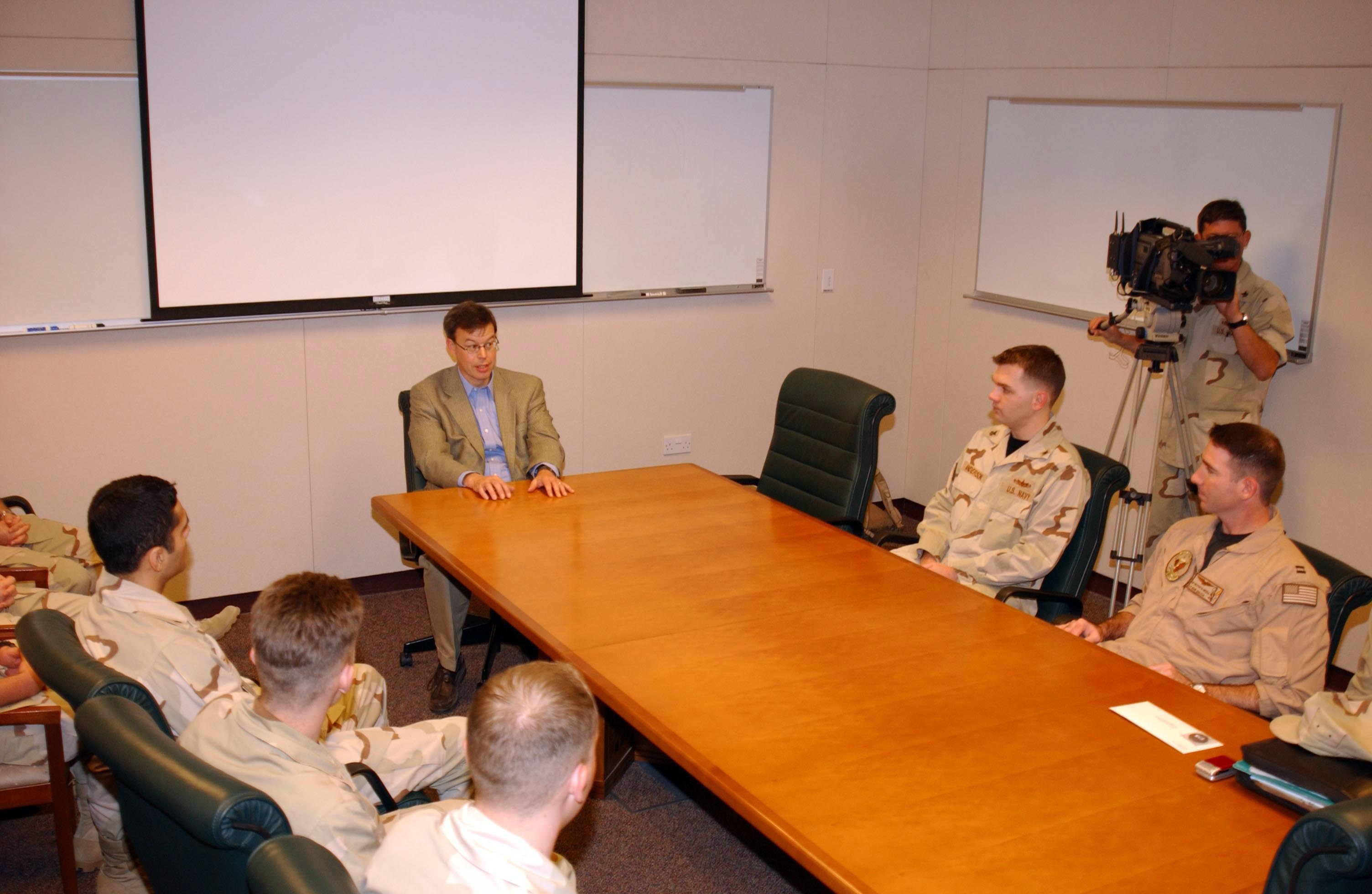
Senator Talent addresses a group of sailors from Missouri on board Naval Support Activity Bahrain in 2004

During his tenure, Talent served on the Senate Armed Services Committee, Special Committee on Aging, Agriculture, Nutrition and Forestry Committee, and Energy and Natural Resources Committee.

==== 2006 election ====
Talent sought re-election in the 2006 Senate election. His Democratic opponent was State Auditor Claire McCaskill. Talent held a fundraising advantage, in part because of support from the Bush administration; on October 11, 2005, Vice President Dick Cheney held a fundraiser for Talent. Talent accepted $5,000 from the lobbyist Jack Abramoff. Talent subsequently refunded all $5,000.

Talent received a number of endorsements for his re-election, including from the Missouri Farm Bureau, the St. Louis Police Officers' Association, the Missouri Pork Association, the National Association of Wholesaler-Distributors, the Missouri Corn Growers Association, and Veterans of Foreign Wars.

In 2006, Roll Call reported that lobbying interests in Washington, D.C., had pledged to raise $1 million for Talent's re-election. Talent stated that he does not give favors in exchange for donations, and that he "wouldn't take five dollars from someone who expects something for it."

McCaskill and Talent debated each other on Meet the Press on October 8, 2006. McCaskill narrowly defeated Talent on November 7, 2006, with a 50% to 47% margin of victory.

Having lost his reelection bid, Talent was considered a possible candidate for governor of Missouri in 2008 after incumbent and fellow Republican Matt Blunt decided to not seek re-election. Talent did not enter the race, which was won by Democrat Jay Nixon.

==== Committee assignments ====
- Senate Committee on Armed Services
  - Subcommittee on Seapower (chairman)
- Senate Committee on Agriculture, Nutrition and Forestry
  - Subcommittee on Marketing, Inspection, and Product Promotion (chairman)
- Senate Committee on Energy and Natural Resources
- Senate Special Committee on Aging

== Political views ==
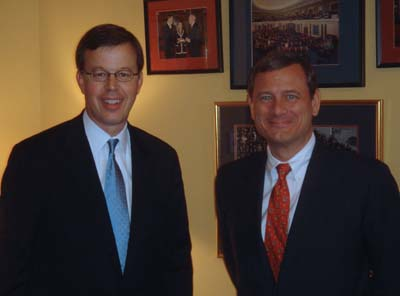
Jim Talent visited by then Chief Justice nominee John Roberts in 2005

Talent is widely regarded by political analysts as a reliable conservative, receiving a life score of 93 out of 100 from the American Conservative Union. The National Right to Life Committee gave Talent a 100% rating. In 2005, Talent was tied for the third-highest rating among all senators and representatives as determined by the Republican Liberty Caucus, which promotes "liberty-minded, limited-government individuals to office."

=== Energy ===
Talent supported the new Renewable Fuel Standard, which would add 7.5 billion US gallons (28,000,000 m^{3}) of renewable fuels to the national supply by 2012, including a measure to include tax credits for businesses offering soybean-based fuels. In addition to renewable fuels, Talent supported drilling in the Arctic as a step in the direction of energy independence, which he sees as critical to national security.

=== Health care ===
Talent supported the Medicare prescription drug benefit called Medicare Part D, the purpose of which is to reduce the amount seniors pay for their prescription drugs. Talent called for waiving a one percent penalty for senior citizens who missed the deadline to sign up for the program.

Talent voted against an amendment allowing Medicare to negotiate a bulk purchase discount for prescription drugs.

Talent supported limiting awards in medical liability lawsuits. He believes that "medical liability relief will cut costs because physicians won't have to practice 'defensive medicine.'"

Talent supported and proposed legislation to allow trade organizations to sponsor health insurance plans, which he believes would provide uninsured workers the opportunity for more affordable health care.

=== Predatory lending ===
Talent sponsored legislation to cap the annual percentage interest rate for payday loans to military service personnel from an average of around 39% to 36%.

=== Stem cell research ===
After joining the Senate in 2002, Talent supported federal legislation that would ban embryonic stem cell research or federal funding for embryonic stem cell research. This included cosponsoring a bill (S.658) sponsored by Senator Sam Brownback, which would ban all forms of human cloning including embryonic therapeutic cloning techniques that are seen as crucial to stem cell research.

On February 10, 2006, Talent withdrew his support for the bill, citing the need to balance research and protection against human cloning. This move followed criticism by Talent's opponent in the 2006 election, Claire McCaskill, as well as pressure from Missouri business interests that oppose restrictions on stem cell research. Though this reversal was criticized as being politically motivated, Talent told the Associated Press, "The technology is changing all the time and so I'm always considering whether there is a better way to strike the balance." Talent suggested that moral concerns might be put to rest through a possible future scientific breakthrough – replicating embryonic stem cells without the use of cloned embryos.

There was a ballot-initiative in Missouri in November 2006 to amend the state constitution and allow, in line with federal law, stem cell research and treatment. On May 1, 2006, Talent announced his opposition to the proposed ballot-initiative. Stem cell research and treatment is working up to be a divisive issue for many Republicans and is taking a particular prominence in Missouri.

In July 2006, he voted against expanding federal funds for embryonic stem cell research in cases where the embryos were donated by fertility clinics or were created for purposes of fertility treatment. This bill passed the Senate 63–37, but was vetoed by President Bush, in a move that was said to have significant political implications for Talent.

=== Minimum wage ===
Talent did take a position on the ballot-initiative in Missouri, called Proposition B, that would raise the minimum wage in the state to $6.50 per hour, or to the level of the federal minimum wage if that is higher, with subsequent adjustments for inflation. He said he believed it was a state issue, but stated he supports minimum wage increases if they are coupled with tax breaks for small businesses. Talent believed that increasing the minimum wage could reduce the number of jobs by raising the cost of doing business.

=== Abortion ===
Talent supported a ban on abortions, with exceptions for rape, incest, and the life of the mother.

=== Bioterrorism ===
Talent has been outspoken about what he sees as the nation's vulnerability to a growing bioterrorism threat. He was Vice Chair of the bipartisan Commission on the Prevention of WMD proliferation and terrorism, which concluded that, unless action is taken, a biological attack within the United States is increasingly likely and will become a probability by 2013. Together with former Senator Bob Graham, Chairman of the commission, he has criticized the federal government's readiness to deal with major public health crisis'. On January 4, 2010, the two senators published an op-ed in the Washington Post, arguing that an unsatisfactory response to the 2009 flu pandemic shows the need for better medical emergency plans.

== Electoral history ==
- 2006 election for U.S. Senate
  - Jim Talent (R), 47%
  - Claire McCaskill (D), 50%
  - Frank Gilmour (L), 2%
- 2002 election for U.S. Senate
  - Jim Talent (R), 50%
  - Jean Carnahan (D), 49%
  - Tamara A. Millay (L) 1%
  - Daniel "Digger" Romano (G) <1%
- 2000 election for Missouri Governor
  - Bob Holden (D), 49%
  - Jim Talent (R), 48%
- 1998 election for U.S. House of Representatives
  - Jim Talent (R), 70%
  - John Ross (D), 28%
  - Brian Lundy (L), 2%
- 1996 election for U.S. House of Representatives
  - Jim Talent (R), 61%
  - Joan Kelly Horn (D), 37%
- 1994 election for U.S. House of Representatives
  - Jim Talent (R), 67%
  - Pat Kelley (D), 31%
  - Jim Higgens (L), 2%
- 1992 election for U.S. House of Representatives
  - Jim Talent (R), 50%
  - Joan Kelly Horn (D), 48%
  - Jim Higgens (L), 0%
- 1992 Race for U.S. House of Representatives (Republican Primary)
  - Jim Talent (R), 58%
  - Bert Walker (R), 32%

U.S. House of Representatives
Preceded by Joan Horn	Member of the U.S. House of Representatives from Missouri's 2nd congressional district 1993–2001	Succeeded by Todd Akin
Preceded by Jan Meyers	Chair of the House Small Business Committee; 1997–2001	Succeeded by Don Manzullo
Party political offices
Preceded by Margaret Kelly	Republican nominee for Governor of Missouri; 2000	Succeeded by Matt Blunt
Preceded by John Ashcroft	Republican nominee for U.S. Senator from Missouri (Class 1); 2002, 2006	Succeeded by Todd Akin
U.S. Senate
Preceded by Jean Carnahan	U.S. Senator (Class 1) from Missouri; 2002–2007; Served alongside: Kit Bond	Succeeded by Claire McCaskill
U.S. order of precedence (ceremonial)
Preceded by Doug Jones as Former U.S. Senator	Order of precedence of the United States	Succeeded by George LeMieux as Former U.S. Senator
