= Jack Buechner =

American lawyer and politician (1940–2020)

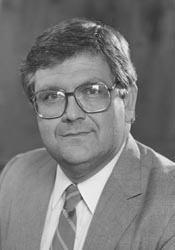

Member of the U.S. House of Representatives from Missouri's 2nd district
- In office January 3, 1987 – January 3, 1991
- Preceded by: Robert A. Young
- Succeeded by: Joan Kelly Horn

Member of the Missouri House of Representatives from the 94th district
- In office January 3, 1973 – January 5, 1983
- Preceded by: Richard J. DeCoster
- Succeeded by: Stephen C. Banton

Personal details
- Born: John William Buechner; June 4, 1940 Kirkwood, Missouri, U.S.
- Died: March 6, 2020 (aged 79) Washington, D.C., U.S.
- Party: Republican
- Spouse(s): Marietta Caiarelli (divorced); Nancy Chanitz Buechner (1990–2006, her death); Andrea Dravo Buechner
- Children: 3
- Education: Benedictine College (BA); Saint Louis University (JD)
- Occupation: Lawyer

John William Buechner (June 4, 1940 – March 6, 2020) was an American lawyer and politician from who served in the United States House of Representatives, representing Missouri's 2nd congressional district from 1987 to 1991. After serving in Congress, Buechner (BEEK-ner) became president of the International Republican Institute and was an associate at Manatt, Phelps & Phillips. From 2001 until his retirement in 2005, he was the president of the Presidential Classroom program. He served as senior counsel to The Hawthorn Group in Alexandria, Virginia, and was on the advisory board of Bloomberg Government. He was also a member of the ReFormers Caucus of Issue One.

== Biography ==
Buechner was born and raised in Kirkwood, Missouri, and attended parochial schools. He graduated from Benedictine College in Atchison, Kansas, and graduated with a BA in political science. He received his JD from Saint Louis University School of Law.

== Career ==
He was elected to the Missouri House of Representatives in 1972 and served until 1982. For the 1964, 1980, and 1988 Republican National Conventions, Buechner was a delegate. In 1984 he ran for the U.S. House of Representatives in Missouri's 2nd congressional district, challenging incumbent Democrat Robert A. Young. Buechner lost narrowly to Young, receiving 47.5% of the vote.

In 1986, Buechner again challenged Young, and this time he was elected, winning 52.7% of the vote. In 1987, Buechner was among 26 House Republicans who voted against overriding President Ronald Reagan's veto of a clean water bill that Reagan believed was "loaded with waste and larded with pork."

At the House, Buechner served in the Budget Committee and the Committee on Science, Space and Technology. The American Conservative Union gave Buechner an 86% conservative rating for his 1987 votes on certain bills; subsequent ratings were 88% in 1988, 73% in 1989, and 67% in 1990.

Buechner was re-elected in 1988, but in 1990 he was defeated by Democrat Joan Kelly Horn by only 54 votes. In that election, 102 of the 406 House members who won re-election did so with 60 percent of the vote or less, and R.W. Apple Jr. of The New York Times blamed "taxes and the budget battle" for Buechner's loss. Buechner was the first Congressional guest on Late Night with David Letterman. For around five times until 1992, Buechner was among participants in weekly Thursday night poker games that Senator Alfonse D'Amato hosted in D'Amato's Washington office. Those poker games helped lobbyists connect to members of Congress.

After Congress, Buechner became president of the International Republican Institute. After Senator John McCain became chairman of the Institute, the board fired Buechner, who later described his dismissal as "less than gracious." He also became a partner at the Washington, D.C., office of law firm Manatt, Phelps & Phillips and later Anderson Kill & Olick, P.C. In academia, Buechner was a visiting professor of political thought at Webster University Vienna and adjunct professor of political science at Saint Louis University and Stephens College.

== Personal life ==
Buechner's first marriage was to Marietta Caiarelli, a nurse. They had a son, Terrence, in 1969, and another son, Patrick. In 1990, Buechner married Nancy Chanitz and had another son, Charles. They lived in McLean, Virginia. Nancy died in 2006. Buechner married Andrea Dravo, an attorney, in 2009. They lived in Washington, D.C., prior to Buechner's death in 2020. Buechner died on March 6, 2020, in Washington, D.C.

U.S. House of Representatives
Preceded by Robert A. Young	Member of the U.S. House of Representatives from Missouri's 2nd congressional district 1987–1991	Succeeded by Joan Kelly Horn
