= Joan Kelly Horn =

American politician (born 1936)

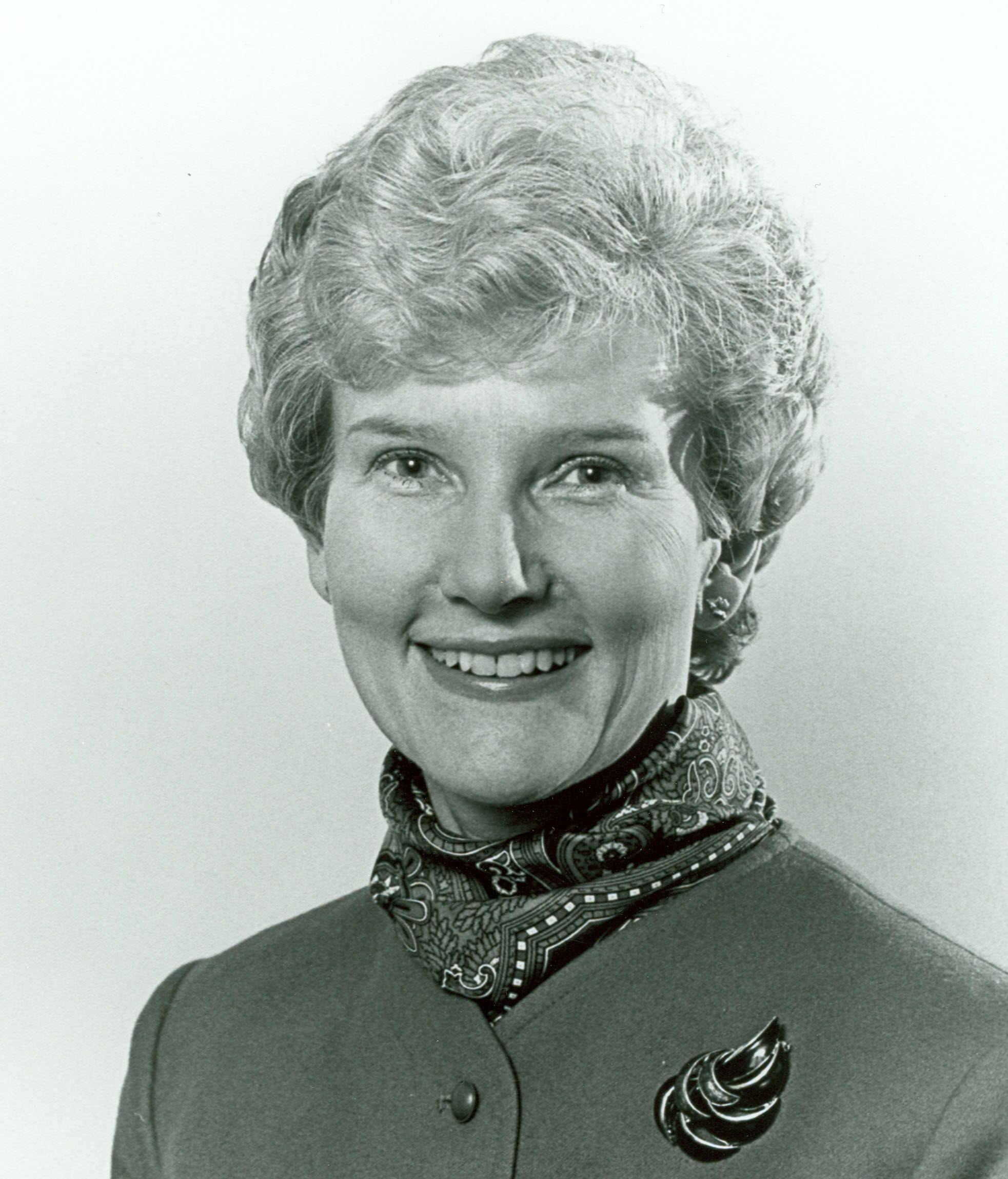

Member of the U.S. House of Representatives from Missouri's 2nd district
- In office January 3, 1991 – January 3, 1993
- Preceded by: Jack Buechner
- Succeeded by: Jim Talent

Personal details
- Born: October 18, 1936 (age 89) St. Louis, Missouri, U.S.
- Party: Democratic
- Education: University of Missouri (BA, MA)

Joan Kelly Horn (born October 18, 1936) is an American politician from Missouri. She served one term in the United States House of Representatives representing Missouri's 2nd congressional district. She is a member of the Democratic Party.

She was elected to Congress in 1990, upsetting incumbent Republican Jack Buechner by 54 votes in a district that included most of St. Louis' western suburbs, such as Florissant, St. Charles, and Town and Country. Earlier in 1990, the Democratic-controlled Missouri state legislature approved a new congressional district map that was intended to preserve heavy Democratic majorities in the two districts that included St. Louis itself — the 1st, represented by Democrat Bill Clay and the 3rd, represented by then-House Majority Leader Dick Gephardt. In the process, the legislature shifted most of the heavily Democratic areas of the 2nd to the 1st and 3rd.

However, the new map had been drawn well before the elections, and no one had anticipated Horn's upset win over Buechner. Horn realized the new map put her in serious electoral trouble, and asked that the map be redrawn, even requesting a sliver of St. Louis. However, Clay and Gephardt turned her down. In November 1992, Horn was narrowly defeated by Republican State House Minority Leader Jim Talent. She was defeated in a rematch against Talent in 1996.

== See also ==
- Women in the United States House of Representatives

U.S. House of Representatives
Preceded by Jack Buechner	Member of the U.S. House of Representatives from Missouri's 2nd congressional district 1991–1993	Succeeded by Jim Talent
U.S. order of precedence (ceremonial)
Preceded by Wendell Bailey as Former U.S. Representative	Order of precedence of the United States as Former U.S. Representative	Succeeded by James Whitney Dunn as Former U.S. Representative
