= 1996 Missouri lieutenant gubernatorial election =

- November 5, 1996
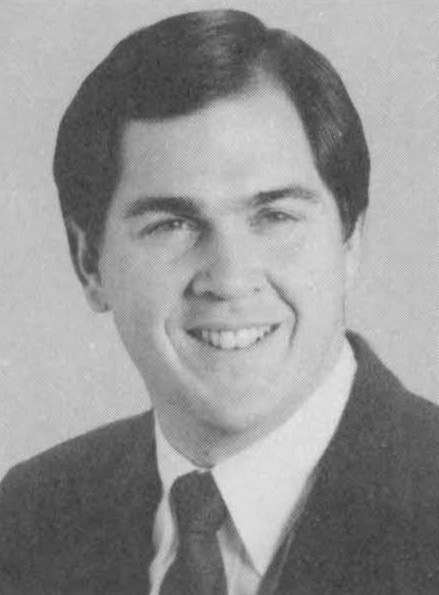

Nominee	Roger B. Wilson	Bill Kenney
Party	Democratic	Republican
Popular vote	1,129,409	896,847
Percentage	53.5%	42.5%
- County results Wilson: 40–50% 50–60% 60–70% 70–80% Kenney: 40–50% 50–60% 60–70%
Lieutenant Governor before election
Roger B. Wilson
Democratic
Elected Lieutenant Governor
Roger B. Wilson
Democratic

The 1996 Missouri lieutenant gubernatorial election was held on November 5, 1996. Democratic incumbent Roger B. Wilson defeated Republican nominee Bill Kenney with 53.52% of the vote.

== General election ==
=== Candidates ===
Major party candidates

- Bill Kenney, Republican
- Roger B. Wilson, Democratic

Other candidates

- Jeanne Bojarski, Libertarian
- Patricia A. Griffard, Natural Law

=== Results ===
1996 Missouri lieutenant gubernatorial election
Party	Candidate	Votes	%	±%
Democratic	Roger B. Wilson (incumbent)	1,129,409	53.52%	
Republican	Bill Kenney	896,847	42.50%	
Libertarian	Jeanne Bojarski	55,436	2.63%	
Natural Law	Patricia A. Griffard	28,588	1.36%	
Majority		232,562		
Turnout		2,110,300		
Democratic hold		Swing		
