= 1992 Missouri lieutenant gubernatorial election =

- November 3, 1992
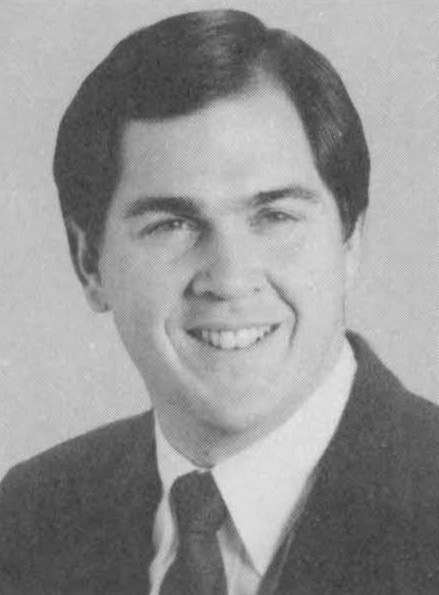

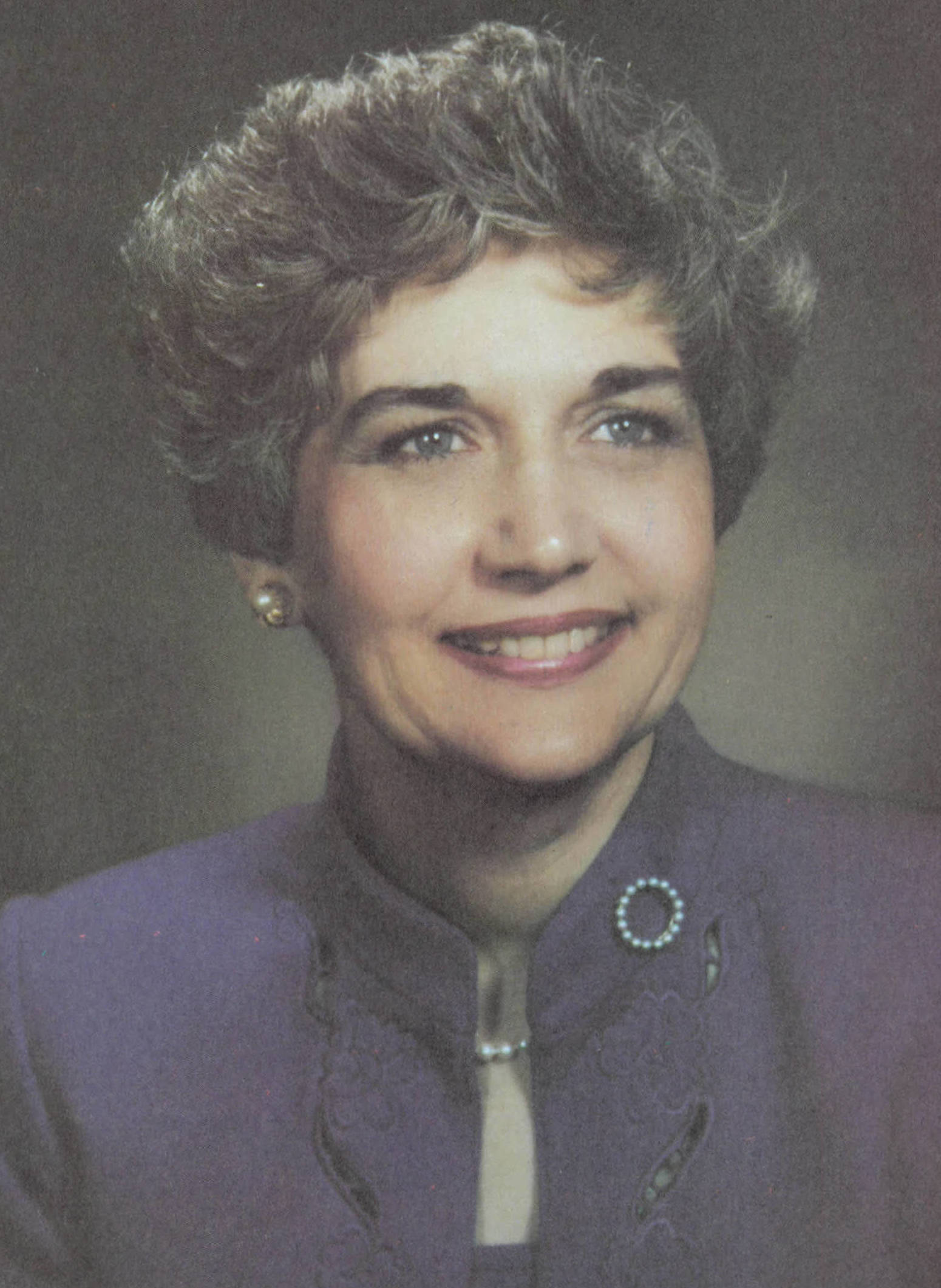
Nominee	Roger B. Wilson	Margaret B. Kelly
Party	Democratic	Republican
Popular vote	1,151,357	1,114,305
Percentage	49.5%	47.9%
- County results Wilson: 40–50% 50–60% 60–70% Kelly: 40–50% 50–60% 60–70%
Lieutenant Governor before election
Mel Carnahan
Democratic
Elected Lieutenant Governor
Roger B. Wilson
Democratic

The 1992 Missouri lieutenant gubernatorial election was held on November 3, 1992. Democratic nominee Roger B. Wilson defeated Republican nominee Margaret B. Kelly with 49.50% of the vote.

== Primary elections ==
Primary elections were held on August 4, 1992.

=== Democratic primary ===
==== Candidates ====
- Roger B. Wilson, State Senator
- Mary Ross
- Larry Rice
- Prentess E. Clifton Sr.
- Richard T. Bullet Train Pisani

==== Results ====
Democratic primary results
Party	Candidate	Votes	%
Democratic	Roger B. Wilson	297,319	46.33
Democratic	Mary Ross	155,629	24.25
Democratic	Larry Rice	127,931	19.93
Democratic	Prentess E. Clifton Sr.	33,321	5.19
Democratic	Richard T. Bullet Train Pisani	27,609	4.30
Total votes		641,809	100.00

=== Republican primary ===
==== Candidates ====
- Margaret B. Kelly, State Auditor of Missouri
- Don Stubblefield
- Jerry Malone Peters

==== Results ====
Republican primary results
Party	Candidate	Votes	%
Republican	Margaret B. Kelly	281,211	71.33
Republican	Don Stubblefield	81,584	20.69
Republican	Jerry Malone Peters	31,439	7.98
Total votes		394,234	100.00

== General election ==
=== Candidates ===
Major party candidates

- Roger B. Wilson, Democratic
- Margaret B. Kelly, Republican

Other candidates

- Franklin M. Nugent, Libertarian

=== Results ===
1992 Missouri lieutenant gubernatorial election
Party	Candidate	Votes	%	±%
Democratic	Roger B. Wilson	1,151,357	49.50%	
Republican	Margaret B. Kelly	1,114,305	47.91%	
Libertarian	Franklin M. Nugent	60,320	2.59%	
Majority		37,052		
Turnout				
Democratic hold		Swing		
