= 1996 Missouri gubernatorial election =

- November 5, 1996
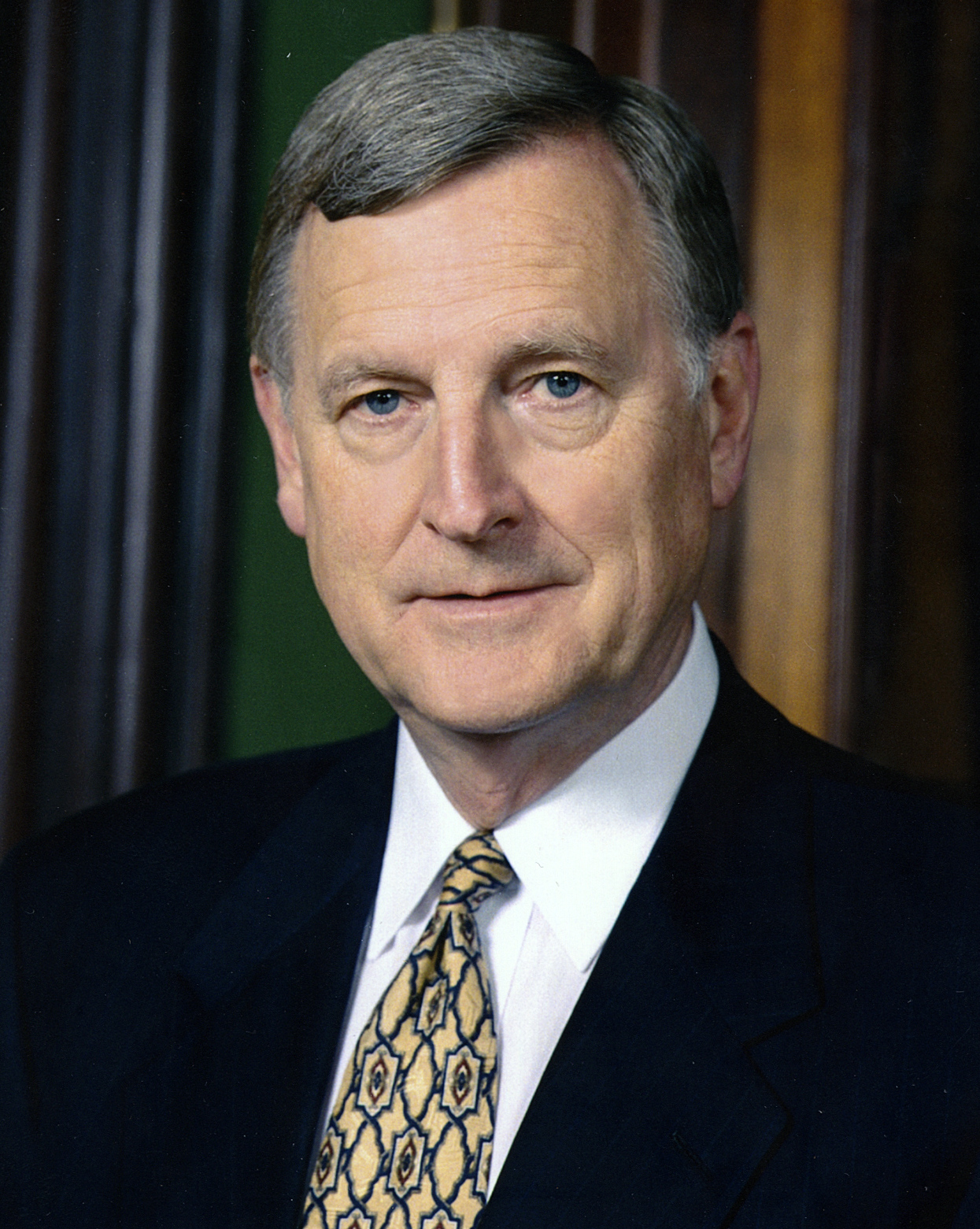

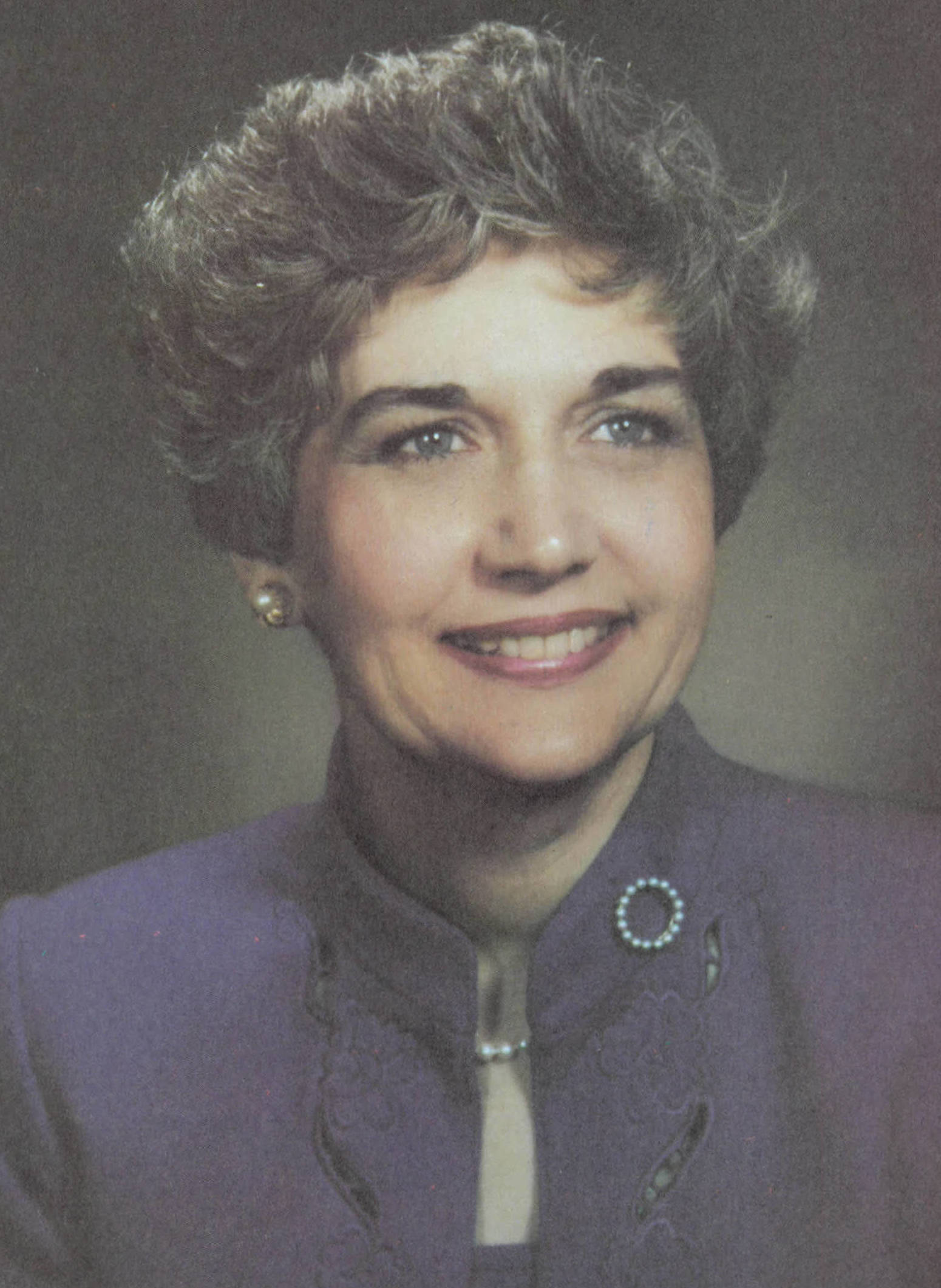
Nominee	Mel Carnahan	Margaret B. Kelly
Party	Democratic	Republican
Popular vote	1,224,801	866,268
Percentage	57.17%	40.43%
- County results Carnahan: 40–50% 50–60% 60–70% 70–80% Kelly: 40–50% 50–60% 60–70%
Governor before election
Mel Carnahan
Democratic
Elected Governor
Mel Carnahan
Democratic

The 1996 Missouri gubernatorial election was held on November 5, 1996, and resulted in a victory for the Democratic nominee, incumbent Governor Mel Carnahan, over the Republican candidate, State Auditor Margaret B. Kelly, and Libertarian J. Mark Oglesby.

Governor Carnahan died in a plane crash on October 16, 2000, near the end of this term, and was replaced by Lt. Governor Roger B. Wilson.

== Primary results ==
Democratic primary results
Party	Candidate	Votes	%
Democratic	Mel Carnahan (incumbent)	347,488	81.70%
Democratic	Ruth Redel	33,452	7.87%
Democratic	Edwin W. Howald	29,890	7.03%
Democratic	Nicholas Clement	14,490	3.40%
Total votes		425,320	100.0%

Republican primary results
Party	Candidate	Votes	%
Republican	Margaret B. Kelly	219,435	77.73%
Republican	John M. Swenson	29,675	10.51%
Republican	David Andrew Brown	18,755	6.64%
Republican	Lester W. Duggan Jr.	14,448	5.12%
Total votes		282,313	100.0%

== Results ==
1996 gubernatorial election, Missouri
Party	Candidate	Votes	%	±%
Democratic	Mel Carnahan (incumbent)	1,224,801	57.17	−1.51
Republican	Margaret B. Kelly	866,268	40.43	−0.89
Libertarian	J. Mark Oglesby	51,432	2.40	+2.40
N/A	V. Marvalene Pankey (write-in)	10	0.00	
N/A	Jock Peacock (write-in)	7	0.00	
Majority		358,533	16.73	−0.63
Turnout		2,142,518	41.87	−3.94
Democratic hold		Swing		
