= May Scheve =

American politician

May E. Scheve Reardon (born June 27, 1964) is a former American Democratic politician who served in the Missouri House of Representatives. Born in St. Louis, Missouri, she graduated from Saint Louis University and Webster University.

She got started in politics by volunteering to help the presidential campaign of Richard Gephardt. She became the youngest woman elected to the General Assembly and became the first woman to run the Missouri Lottery.
