= Margaret B. Kelly =

American politician

Margaret Kelly
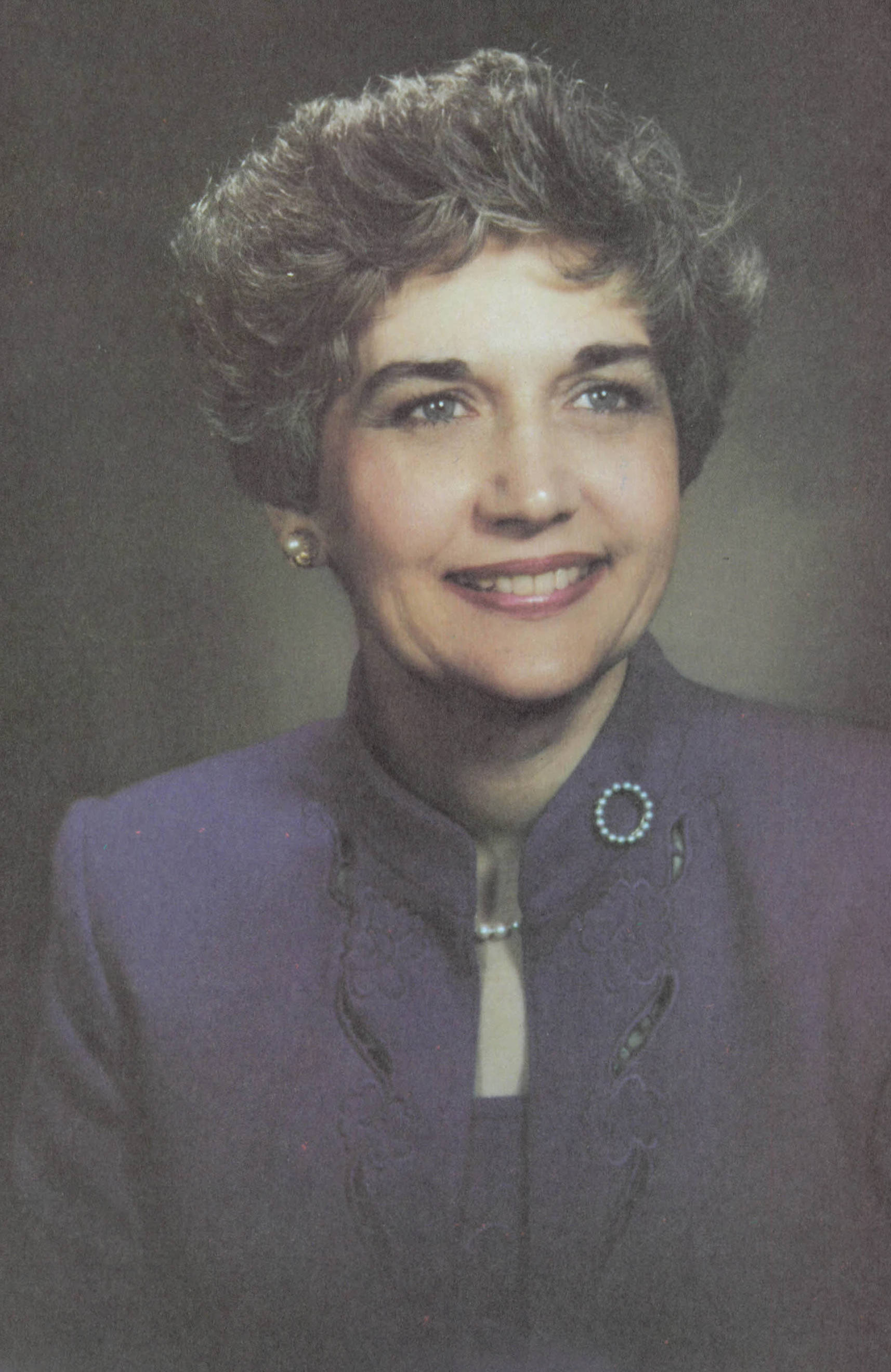

33rd Auditor of Missouri
- In office July 16, 1984 – January 1999
- Governor: Kit Bond; John Ashcroft; Mel Carnahan
- Preceded by: James Antonio
- Succeeded by: Claire McCaskill

Personal details
- Born: September 17, 1935 (age 90) Crystal City, Missouri, U.S.
- Party: Republican
- Education: University of Missouri (BS); Missouri State University (MBA)

Margaret Blake Kelly (born September 17, 1935) is an American former politician and accountant from Missouri.

Kelly served as the State Auditor of Missouri from 1984 to 1999. She is the first woman to hold statewide office in Missouri. Kelly is a Republican.

== Early life, education, and family ==
Kelly was born in Crystal City, Missouri to Emory and Florine Blake. She received her Bachelor of Science degree in business administration from the University of Missouri in 1957. Kelly also received an MBA from Missouri State University (then Southwest Missouri State University) in 1975 and earned her CPA certification in 1982. Kelly is married to William C. Kelly; the Kellys have three sons.

== Career ==
Before entering public life, Kelly worked for various private sector accounting firms for 20 years.

A Republican, Kelly's first elected position was as Cole County auditor. She was elected to that position in 1982.

Governor Kit Bond appointed Kelly to the position of state auditor, filling a vacancy created by the resignation of James F. Antonio. She was inaugurated on July 16, 1984. Kelly is the first woman to hold statewide elected office in Missouri. In November of that year, Harriett Woods was elected lieutenant governor, giving Woods the distinction of being the first woman elected to statewide office in Missouri.

Kelly was elected to a full term as state auditor in 1986 and was re-elected in 1990 and 1994. In 1992, Kelly was the Republican nominee for lieutenant governor, but was defeated by Democrat Roger B. Wilson. In 1996, she ran for governor against Democratic Gov. Mel Carnahan, but lost by a large margin.

Kelly retired from public life after leaving office in January 1999.

Political offices
Preceded by James Antonio	Auditor of Missouri; 1984–1999	Succeeded by Claire McCaskill
Party political offices
Preceded by James Antonio	Republican nominee for Auditor of Missouri; 1986, 1990, 1994	Succeeded by Chuck Pierce
Preceded by Richard Grisham	Republican nominee for Lieutenant Governor of Missouri; 1992	Succeeded by Bill Kenney
Preceded by William Webster	Republican nominee for Governor of Missouri; 1996	Succeeded by Jim Talent
