= Jean Carnahan =

American politician and writer (1933–2024)

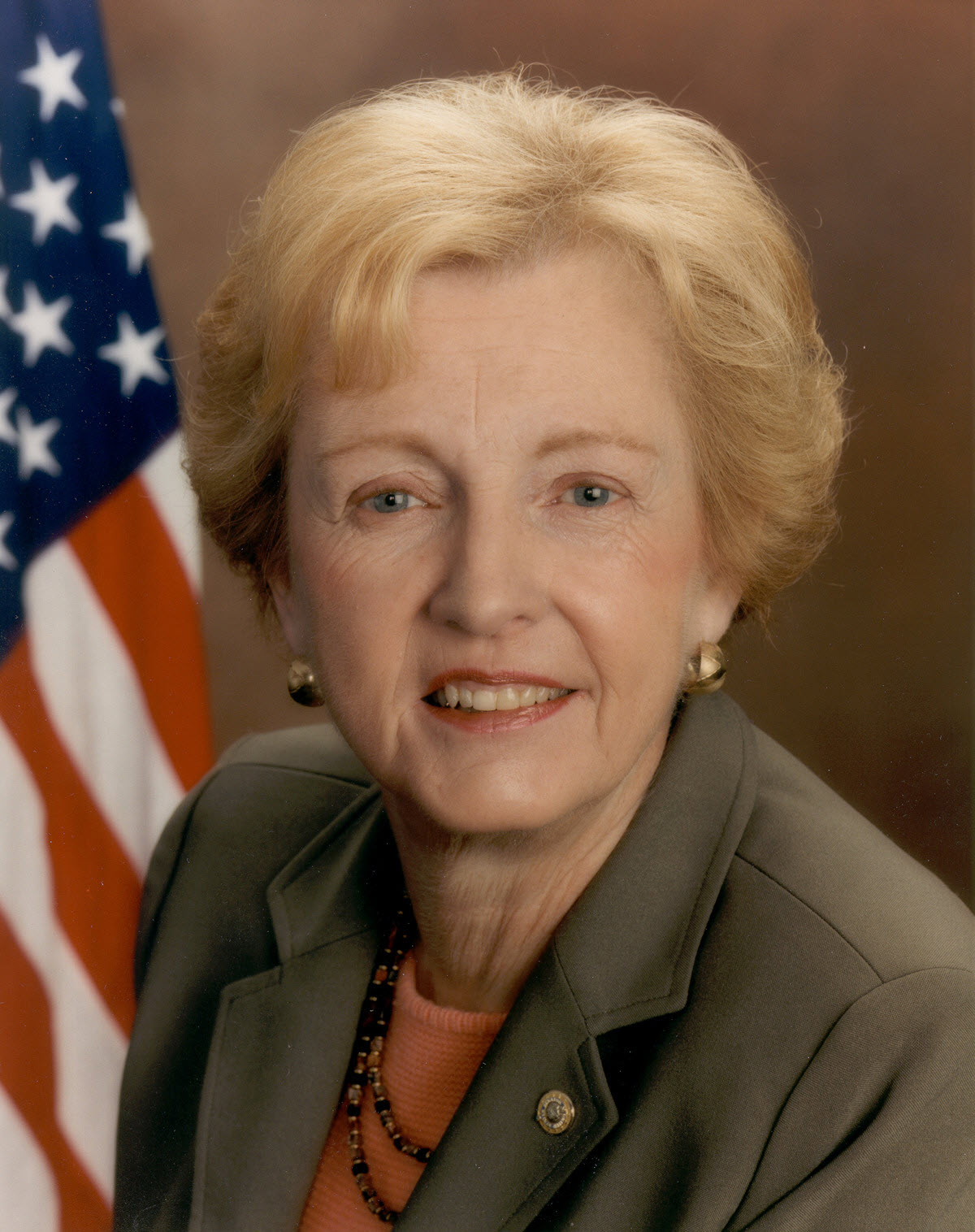
- Official portrait, 2002

United States Senator from Missouri
- In office January 3, 2001 – November 23, 2002
- Appointed by: Roger B. Wilson
- Preceded by: Mel Carnahan (elect); John Ashcroft
- Succeeded by: Jim Talent

First Lady of Missouri
- In role January 11, 1993 – October 16, 2000
- Governor: Mel Carnahan
- Preceded by: Janet Ashcroft
- Succeeded by: Patricia Wilson

Personal details
- Born: Jean Anne Carpenter; December 20, 1933 Washington, D.C., U.S.
- Died: January 30, 2024 (aged 90) Creve Coeur, Missouri, U.S.
- Party: Democratic
- Spouse: Mel Carnahan (m. 1954; died 2000)
- Children: 4, including Russ and Robin
- Education: George Washington University (BA)

Jean Anne Carnahan (née Carpenter; December 20, 1933 – January 30, 2024) was an American politician and writer who was the first lady of Missouri from 1993 to 2000, and served as the state's junior United States senator from 2001 to 2002. A Democrat, she was appointed to fill the Senate seat of her husband Mel Carnahan, who had been posthumously elected after his death in October, becoming the first woman to represent Missouri in the U.S. Senate.

== Early life ==
Jean Anne Carpenter was born on December 20, 1933, in Washington, D.C., to a working-class family; her father was a plumber and her mother a hairdresser. She and her future husband, Mel, both went to Anacostia High School, where they sat next to each other in class. Jean worked through the year while attending George Washington University. She graduated in 1955 with a degree in Business and Public Administration, the first in her family to graduate from high school and college. She was an alumna of Kappa Delta sorority.

Jean and Mel married on June 12, 1954. Two years later, they moved to his home state of Missouri. They settled in Rolla, where Mel opened a law practice, in 1959.

== Career ==
As her husband entered politics, she became his political partner, taking an active role writing his speeches and helping run all 20 of his campaigns. She was also active in her own right, leading petition drives for mental health and school bonds in Rolla.

=== First Lady of Missouri ===
Her husband was elected Governor of Missouri, serving from 1993 to 2000. She was an activist First Lady: an advocate for on-site daycare centers for working families, childhood immunization, abuse centers, the arts, and Habitat for Humanity. She also made a priority of restoring the Governor's mansion to make it more open to the public. She raised about $1.5 million in funds to restore the mansion, including a new fireplace, cleaning up the basement for more space, and adding a fountain with a sculpture of three children. During her tenure she wrote two books about Missouri history, including If Walls Could Talk: The Story of Missouri's First Families in 1998, and Christmas at the Mansion in 1999. She also wrote Will You Say a Few Words? , a compilation of speeches she gave, in 2000. Some of the earnings from the books went towards renovations in the Governor's mansion.

=== U.S. Senate ===
In 2000, Governor Carnahan ran for a Senate seat from Missouri against incumbent Republican John Ashcroft in a hotly contested battle, in which Senate control was on the line. Three weeks before election day, the governor was killed in an airplane crash, along with their son Randy (who piloted the plane) and Chris Sifford, the governor's chief of staff and campaign advisor. Due to the short amount of time before the election, Missouri election law did not allow his name to be removed from the ballot. Newly inaugurated Governor Roger Wilson announced that he would appoint Jean Carnahan if her husband were to posthumously win the election, making her effectively the Democratic candidate by proxy.

Jean Carnahan initially was unsure whether she was up for running for the seat. But as she saw an outpouring of support from Missouri voters, and wanting to continue her husband's work, Carnahan announced her intent to accept Wilson's appointment. She refrained from running an extensive campaign, making only one advertisement, and making just one TV news appearance. In the end, Mel Carnahan posthumously won (51%–48%), receiving 1.19 million votes out of 2.36 million cast. Jean Carnahan was appointed to the Senate in 2001, but under Missouri law, she would serve only until a special election could be held in 2002.

==== Tenure ====
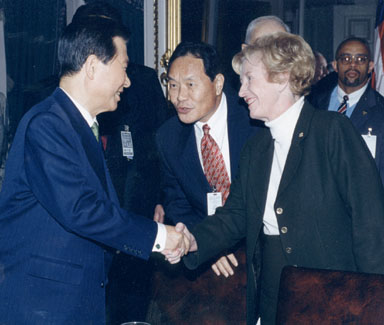
Senator Jean Carnahan meeting with South Korean president Kim Dae-jung

Upon her swearing in, Carnahan became the first woman to represent Missouri in the U.S. Senate. The defeated Ashcroft was subsequently nominated by President George W. Bush to be the United States Attorney General. Carnahan had offered praise to him and opposed a proposed effort to filibuster his nomination, but ultimately voted against Ashcroft's nomination. Carnahan called her vote an 'act of conscience' but the vote opened her up to criticism from Republicans, who had previously showed restraint owing to the circumstances of her appointment.

Carnahan also took a lead on other issues. She supported the merger between Trans World Airlines, who had 12,000 employees in St. Louis, and American Airlines, calling it a "rescue mission" and persuaded fellow senators to not intervene. She also sponsored legislation to provide economic benefits and health care for laid off airline workers post-9/11. She voted in favor of the Bush tax cuts.

In 2002, the special election was held for the remainder of the six-year term. Carnahan formally announced her campaign April 28, 2002, and entered as one of the most vulnerable incumbents up that cycle. She was defeated in a close race by Republican Jim Talent; the margin was only 22,000 votes (49.8–48.67%).

== Family and later life ==
In 2004, Carnahan's son, Russ Carnahan, was elected to Congress, and her daughter Robin Carnahan was elected Missouri Secretary of State. Robin's bid to follow her mother as a United States senator failed, however, when she was defeated by Republican U.S. Representative Roy Blunt in the 2010 election to succeed retiring Republican Senator Kit Bond. Russ Carnahan lost his House seat in the 2012 elections after his district was eliminated, forcing him to run in a Democratic primary against fellow incumbent Lacy Clay, whose district encompassing inner-city St. Louis was kept largely intact.

After losing her Senate race, Carnahan continued as an activist and author. She wrote six books and numerous opinion pieces. The title of her 2004 book is a phrase used during the 2000 campaign to elect her husband to the Senate after his death, Don't Let the Fire Go Out.

Carnahan died at a hospice facility in Creve Coeur, Missouri, on January 30, 2024, at the age of 90.

== Electoral history ==
- 2000 race for U.S. Senate
  - Mel Carnahan (D), 51% (posthumously elected; Jean Carnahan appointed to fill seat)
  - John Ashcroft (R) (inc.), 48%
- 2002 race for U.S. Senate (special election to fill remainder of term)
  - Jim Talent (R), 50%
  - Jean Carnahan (D) (inc.), 49%

== Books ==
- (1998) If Walls Could Talk: The Story of Missouri's First Families. MMPI ISBN 978-0-9668992-0-7.
- (1999) Christmas at the Mansion. MMPI ISBN 978-0-9668992-1-4.
- (2000) Will You Say a Few Words?. Walsworth Publishing Co. ISBN 978-0-8262-1513-0.
- (2004) Don't Let the Fire Go Out!. University of Missouri Press. ISBN 978-0-8262-1513-0.
- (2009) The Tide Always Comes Back. Skyhorse Publishing ISBN 978-1-60239-744-6.
- (2012) A Little Help from My Friends...and Other Hilarious Tales of Graying Graciously. Vantage Point Books ISBN 978-1-936467-23-5.

== See also ==
- Women in the United States Senate

U.S. Senate
Preceded by Mel Carnahan; Elect	U.S. Senator (Class 1) from Missouri; 2001–2002; Served alongside: Kit Bond	Succeeded by Jim Talent
Preceded by John Ashcroft	U.S. Senator (Class 1) from Missouri; 2001–2002; Served alongside: Kit Bond	Succeeded by Jim Talent
Party political offices
Preceded by Mel Carnahan	Democratic nominee for U.S. Senator from Missouri (Class 1); 2002	Succeeded by Claire McCaskill
