= Roger B. Wilson =

American politician (born 1948)

Roger Wilson
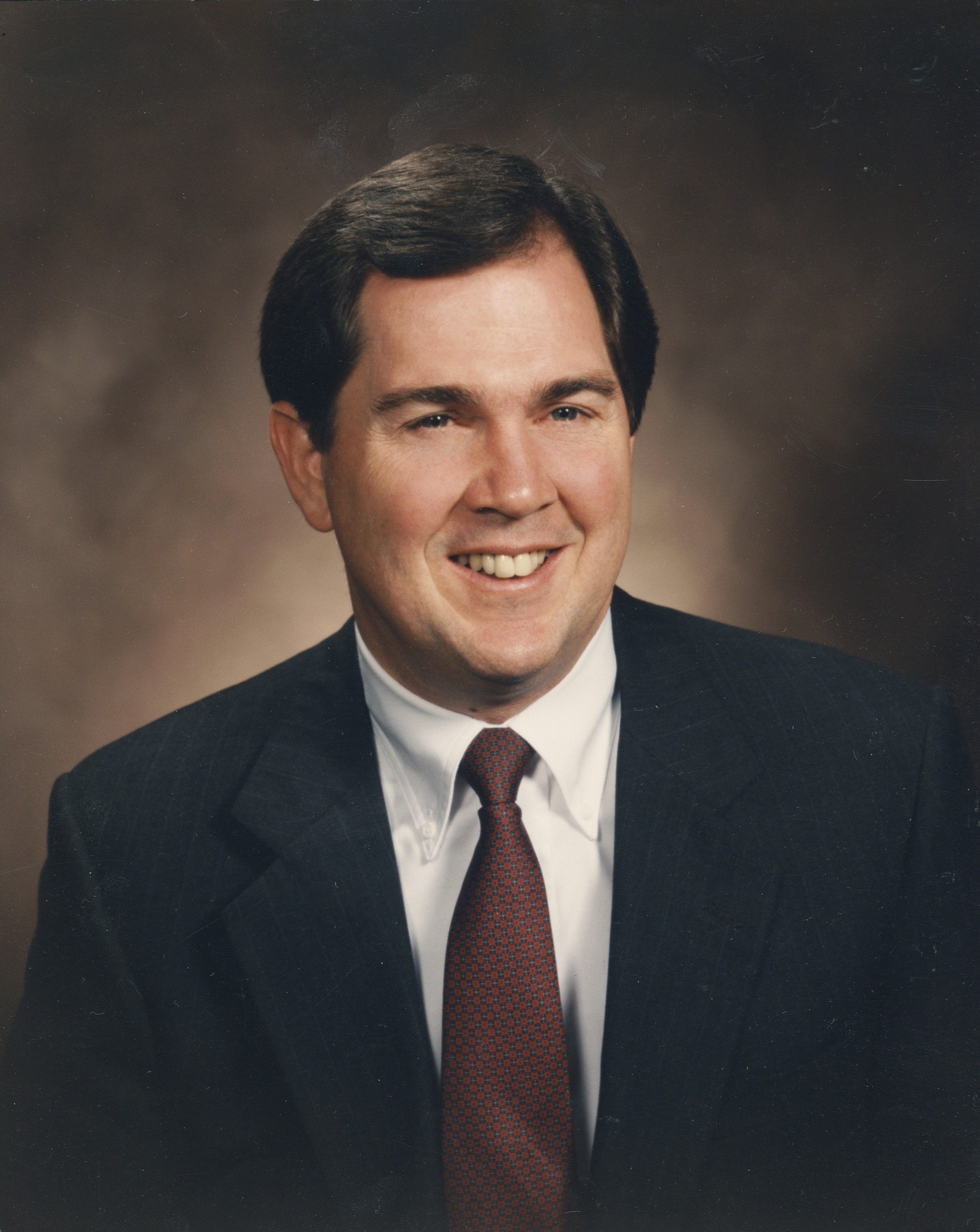
- Official portrait, 1993

Chair of the Missouri Democratic Party
- In office August 7, 2004 – January 27, 2007
- Preceded by: May Scheve
- Succeeded by: John Temporiti

52nd Governor of Missouri
- In office October 16, 2000 – January 8, 2001
- Lieutenant: Joe Maxwell
- Preceded by: Mel Carnahan
- Succeeded by: Bob Holden

44th Lieutenant Governor of Missouri
- In office January 11, 1993 – October 16, 2000
- Governor: Mel Carnahan
- Preceded by: Mel Carnahan
- Succeeded by: Joe Maxwell

Member of the Missouri Senate from the 19th district
- In office February 7, 1979 – January 6, 1993
- Preceded by: Warren Dee Welliver
- Succeeded by: Joe Moseley

Personal details
- Born: Roger Byron Wilson; October 10, 1948 (age 77) Boone County, Missouri, U.S.
- Party: Democratic
- Spouse: Pat Wilson
- Education: Central Methodist University (BA)

Roger Byron Wilson (born October 10, 1948) is an American politician who served as the 44th lieutenant governor of Missouri from January 1993 to October 2000 and as the 52nd governor of Missouri from October 2000 to January 2001. Wilson was serving his second four-year term as lieutenant governor and was preparing to retire from elected public service when Governor Mel Carnahan died in a plane crash on October 16, 2000. Wilson first became acting governor and was sworn in as governor when Carnahan’s death was confirmed.

After leaving the governor’s office, Wilson was elected by fellow Democrats to serve as Missouri Democratic Party chair.

== Early life and education ==
Wilson was born in Boone County, Missouri. His family was prominent in local politics. His father Roger Woodrow Wilson served as Boone County recorder for four years and then served Boone County Collector for 26 years until his death in 1976. His grandfather Roger Isaac Wilson served as the Boone County sheriff, being killed in a shootout with bank robbers in 1933. His maternal grandfather, Ned Gibbs was also in politics, serving as Boone County recorder. He attended college at Central Methodist College and graduated class of 1977. He was a school teacher and an elementary school principal at Russell Boulevard Elementary School in Columbia, Missouri.

== Political career ==
Wilson began his political career as Boone County Collector in 1976, succeeding his late father. He was elected to the Missouri State Senate from the 19th District in a 1979 special election and was re-elected by large majorities in 1980, 1984, and 1988. During his tenure, Wilson would become chair of the Appropriations Committee. In 1992, he ran for Lieutenant Governor of Missouri, and won by a plurality against State Auditor Margaret B. Kelly. He would win a second term in 1996.

=== Lieutenant Governor ===
Wilson's term lasted from 1993 to 2000. During his tenure, voters ratified legislation which expanded the role of Lieutenant Governor, a role once derided for its uselessness. As a result, Wilson served on numerous state boards, such as the Missouri Housing Development Commission, chairing the Missouri Tourism Commission, and being a co-chair of the Missouri Commission on Management and Productivity. In 1995, Wilson served as the tie breaking vote, defeating a provision that would have enabled a referendum on concealed carry. The move proved controversial among opponents of concealed carry and Governor Carnahan. Wilson served as acting governor on numerous occasions, such as in 1997, when for a few weeks, Governor Carnahan was away overseas on a trade mission in Southeast Asia.

=== Governor of Missouri ===
Wilson initially was seen as a strong potential candidate to run for Governor in 2000. However, owing to being significantly outraised by State Treasurer Bob Holden, and wanting to spend more time with his family, Wilson opted not run for Governor. A year later, he declined to run for re-election to Lt. Governor.

In October 2000, on his way to a campaign event for U.S. Senate, term-limited Governor Mel Carnahan died in an airplane crash. Wilson, who was in St. Louis preparing for an event the next day, was immediately rushed back to the state's capital by state police to serve as acting governor. He was officially sworn in as Governor two days later after Carnahan's death was confirmed by authorities. Wilson served as governor until the end of Carnahan's final three months of the term in 2001. Following Governor Carnahan's posthumous election to the U.S. Senate, Wilson appointed his widow Jean Carnahan to serve in his place.

=== Chairman of the Missouri Democratic Party ===
In August 2004, Wilson became Chairman of the Missouri Democratic Party and endorsed Claire McCaskill in her bid to unseat incumbent Governor Bob Holden in the Democratic Primary. McCaskill won the primary, but lost the general election to Republican Matt Blunt. In January 2007, Wilson announced he would not seek an additional term as Democratic Chairman.

== Subsequent career ==
On April 12, 2012, Wilson pleaded guilty to federal charges of money laundering. Wilson had improperly donated money to the Missouri Democratic Party and billed the public entity Missouri Employers Mutual for legal fees to cover it up. Wilson pled guilty and was fined $2,000 by the Missouri Ethics Commission. In July he was sentenced to two years of probation on the money laundering charge.

Wilson was also ousted as President and CEO of Missouri Employers Mutual in Columbia, Missouri in June 2011.

Party political offices
Preceded by Mel Carnahan	Democratic nominee for Lieutenant Governor of Missouri; 1992, 1996	Succeeded by Joe Maxwell
Preceded by May Scheve	Chair of the Missouri Democratic Party; 2004–2007	Succeeded by John Temporiti
Political offices
Preceded by Mel Carnahan	Lieutenant Governor of Missouri; 1993–2000	Succeeded by Joe Maxwell
Preceded by Mel Carnahan	Governor of Missouri; 2000–2001	Succeeded by Bob Holden
U.S. order of precedence (ceremonial)
Preceded by Martha McSally as Former U.S. Senator	Order of precedence of the United States; Within Missouri	Succeeded by Bob Holden as Former Governor
Preceded by Paul LePage as Former Governor	Order of precedence of the United States; Outside Missouri	Succeeded by Bob Holden as Former Governor
