= 1992 Missouri Attorney General election =

- November 3, 1992
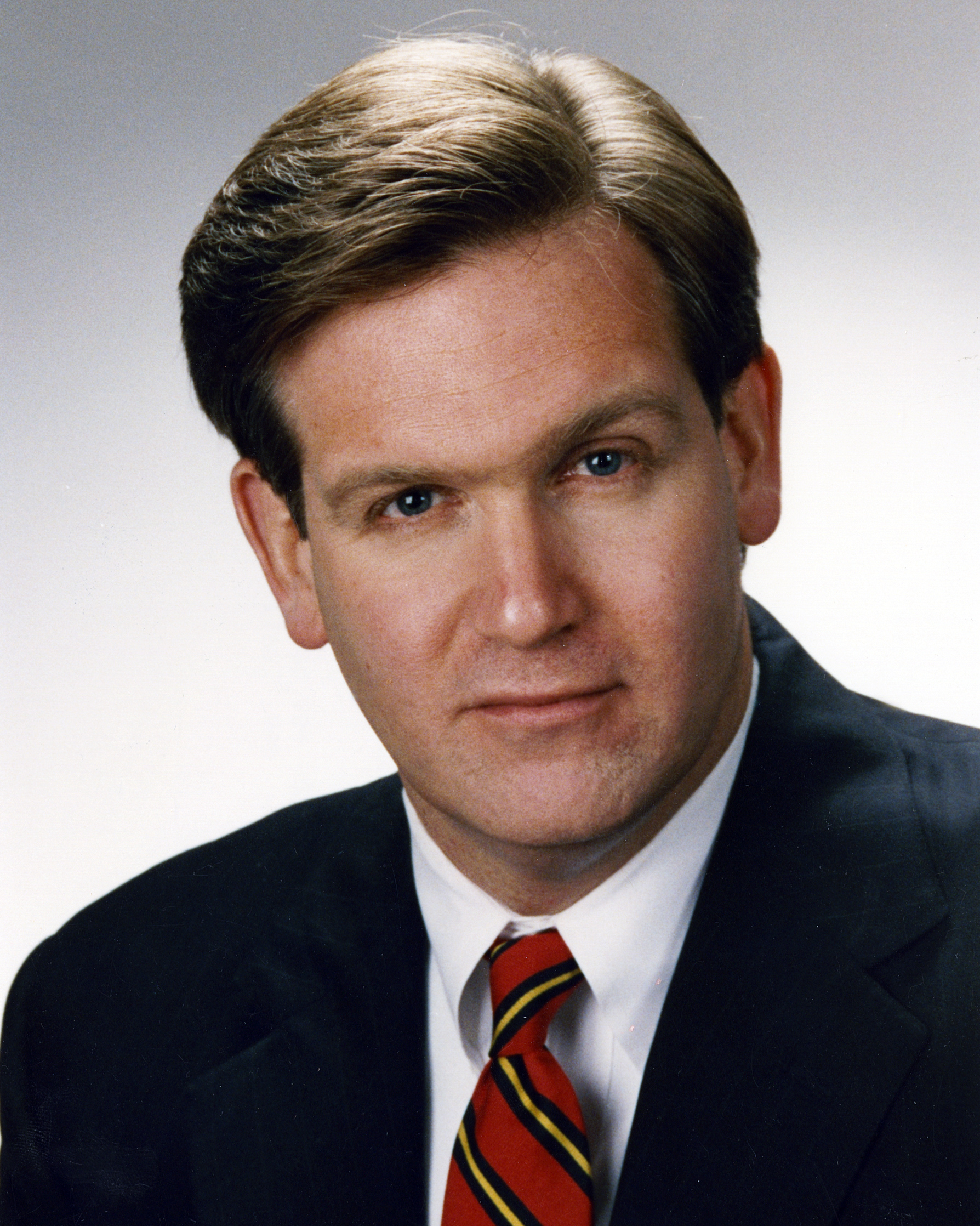

Nominee	Jay Nixon	David Steelman
Party	Democratic	Republican
Popular vote	1,154,714	1,064,814
Percentage	49.94%	46.05%
- County results Nixon: 40–50% 50–60% 60–70% 70–80% Steelman: 40–50% 50–60% 60–70%
Attorney General before election
William L. Webster
Republican
Elected Attorney General
Jay Nixon
Democratic

The 1992 Missouri Attorney General election was held on November 3, 1992, in order to elect the attorney general of Missouri. Democratic nominee and incumbent member of the Missouri Senate Jay Nixon defeated Republican nominee and former member of the Missouri House of Representatives David Steelman and Libertarian nominee Mitchell J. Moore.

== General election ==
On election day, November 3, 1992, Democratic nominee Jay Nixon won the election by a margin of 89,900 votes against his foremost opponent Republican nominee David Steelman, thereby gaining Democratic control over the office of attorney general. Nixon was sworn in as the 40th attorney general of Missouri on January 12, 1993.

=== Results ===
Missouri Attorney General election, 1992
Party	Candidate	Votes	%
Democratic	Jay Nixon	1,154,714	49.94
Republican	David Steelman	1,064,814	46.05
Libertarian	Mitchell J. Moore	92,576	4.01
Total votes		2,312,104	100.00
Democratic gain from Republican			

== See also ==
- 1992 Missouri gubernatorial election
