= 1998 United States Senate election in Missouri =

- November 3, 1998
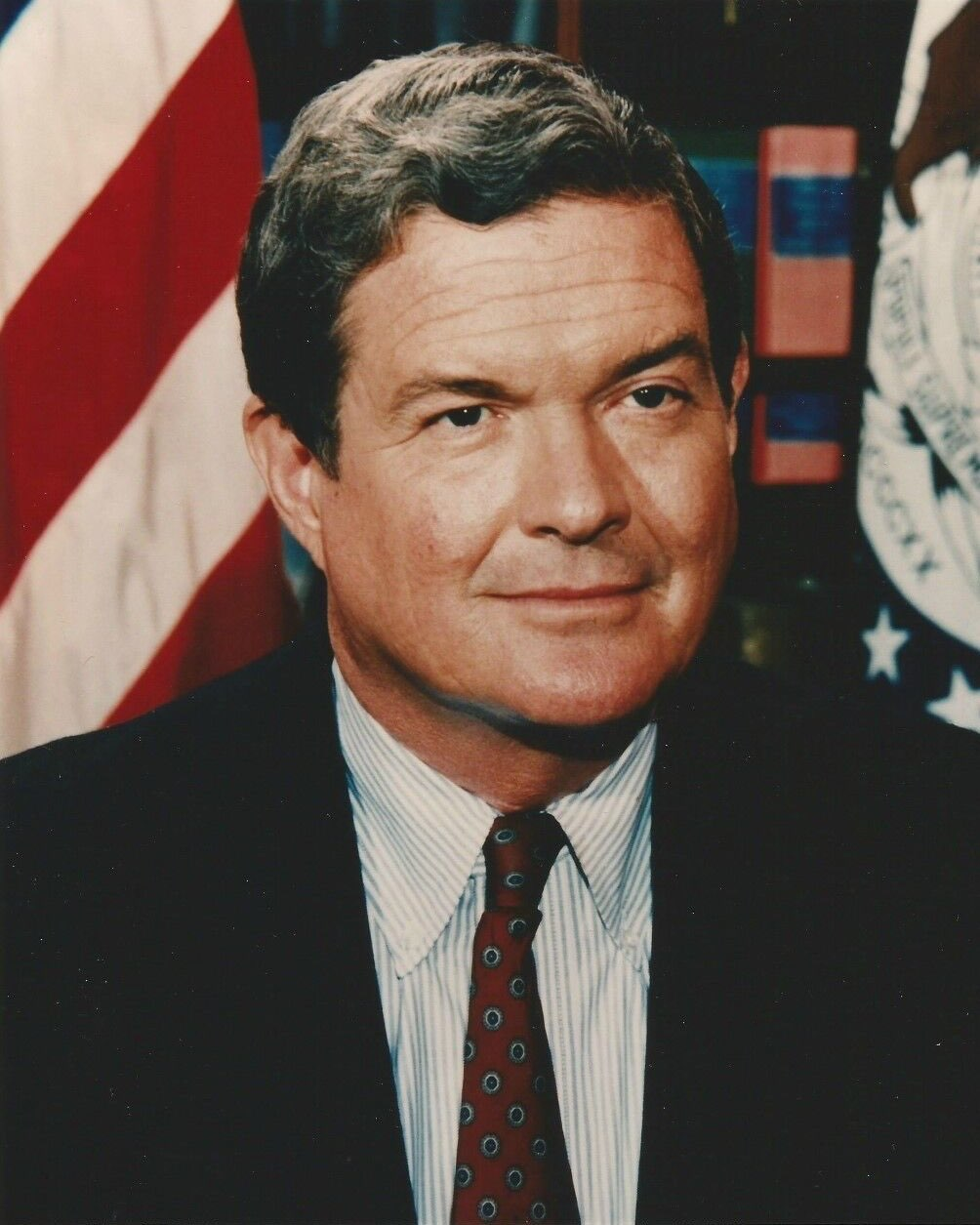

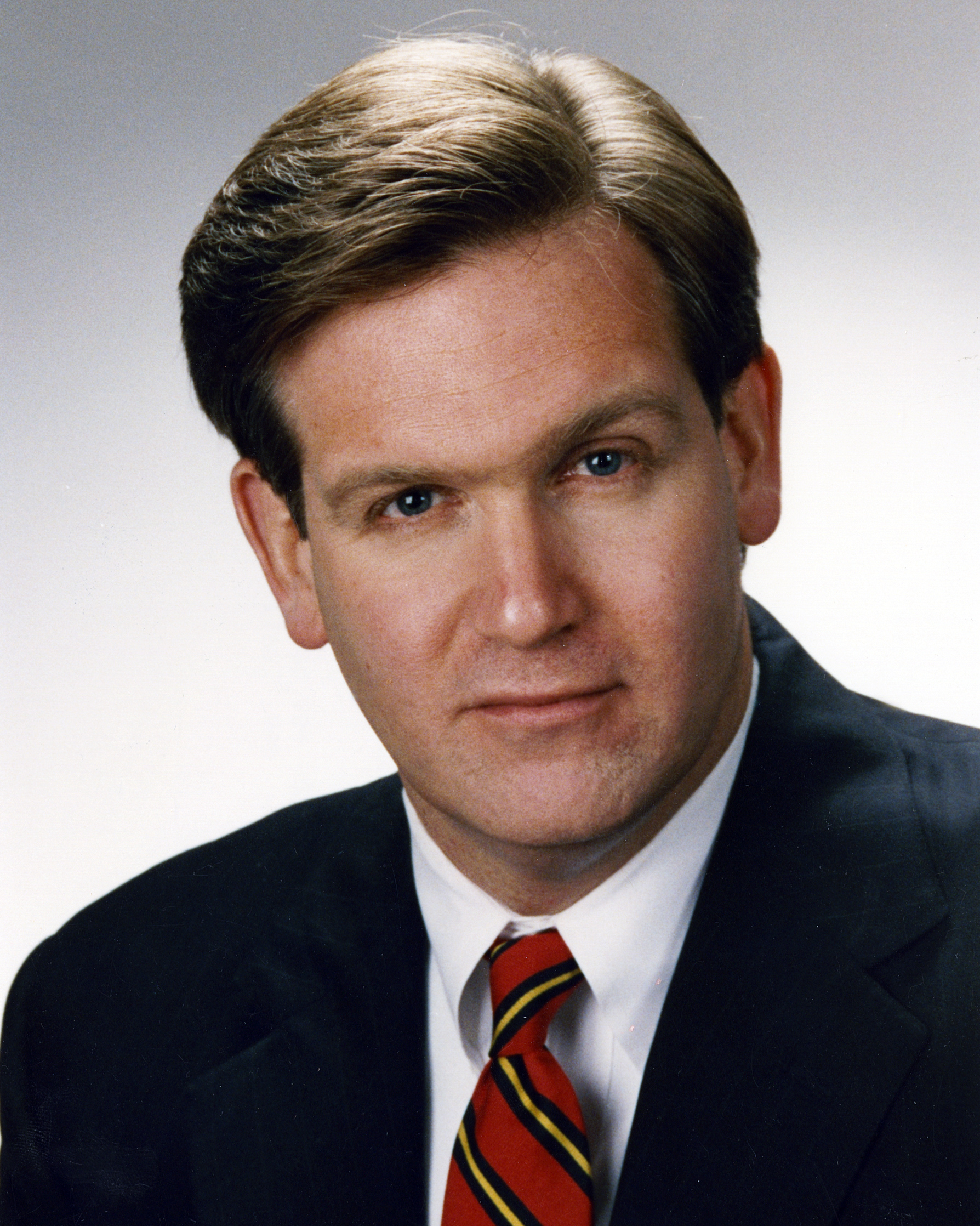
Nominee	Kit Bond	Jay Nixon
Party	Republican	Democratic
Popular vote	830,625	690,208
Percentage	52.68%	43.77%
- County results Bond: 40–50% 50–60% 60–70% 70–80% Nixon: 40–50% 50–60% 60–70%
U.S. senator before election
Kit Bond
Republican
Elected U.S. Senator
Kit Bond
Republican

The 1998 United States Senate election in Missouri was held on November 3, 1998. Republican incumbent Kit Bond was re-elected to a third term over Democratic attorney general Jay Nixon.

== General election ==
=== Candidates ===
- Kit Bond, incumbent U.S. senator since 1987 (Republican)
- Curtis Frazier (Constitution)
- Tamara Millay (Libertarian)
- James Newport (Reform)
- Jay Nixon, Missouri attorney general and 1988 Senate nominee (Democratic)

=== Polling ===
Poll source	Date(s)	Sample size (Note: Key: A – all adults RV – registered voters LV – likely voters V – unclear)	Margin of error	Kit Bond (R)	Jay Nixon (D)	Other / undecided (Note: Calculated by taking the difference of 100% and all other candidates combined.)
Neighbor	October 30, 1998	330	—	54%	28%	18%
Zogby International/JZ Analytics	October 29–30, 1998	600 (LV)	± 4.0%	47%	36%	17%
SurveyUSA	October 26, 1998	500	—	54%	41%	5%
Zogby International/JZ Analytics	August 31 – September 1, 1998	616 (LV)	± 4.0%	53%	30%	17%

=== Results ===
General election results
Party	Candidate	Votes	%
Republican	Kit Bond (incumbent)	830,625	52.68%
Democratic	Jay Nixon	690,208	43.77%
Libertarian	Tamara Millay	31,876	2.02%
Constitution	Curtis Frazier	15,368	0.98%
Reform	James Newport	8,780	0.56%
Majority		140,417	8.90%
Turnout		1,576,857	
Republican hold			

== See also ==
- 1998 United States Senate elections
