= 1984 Missouri Attorney General election =

- November 6, 1984
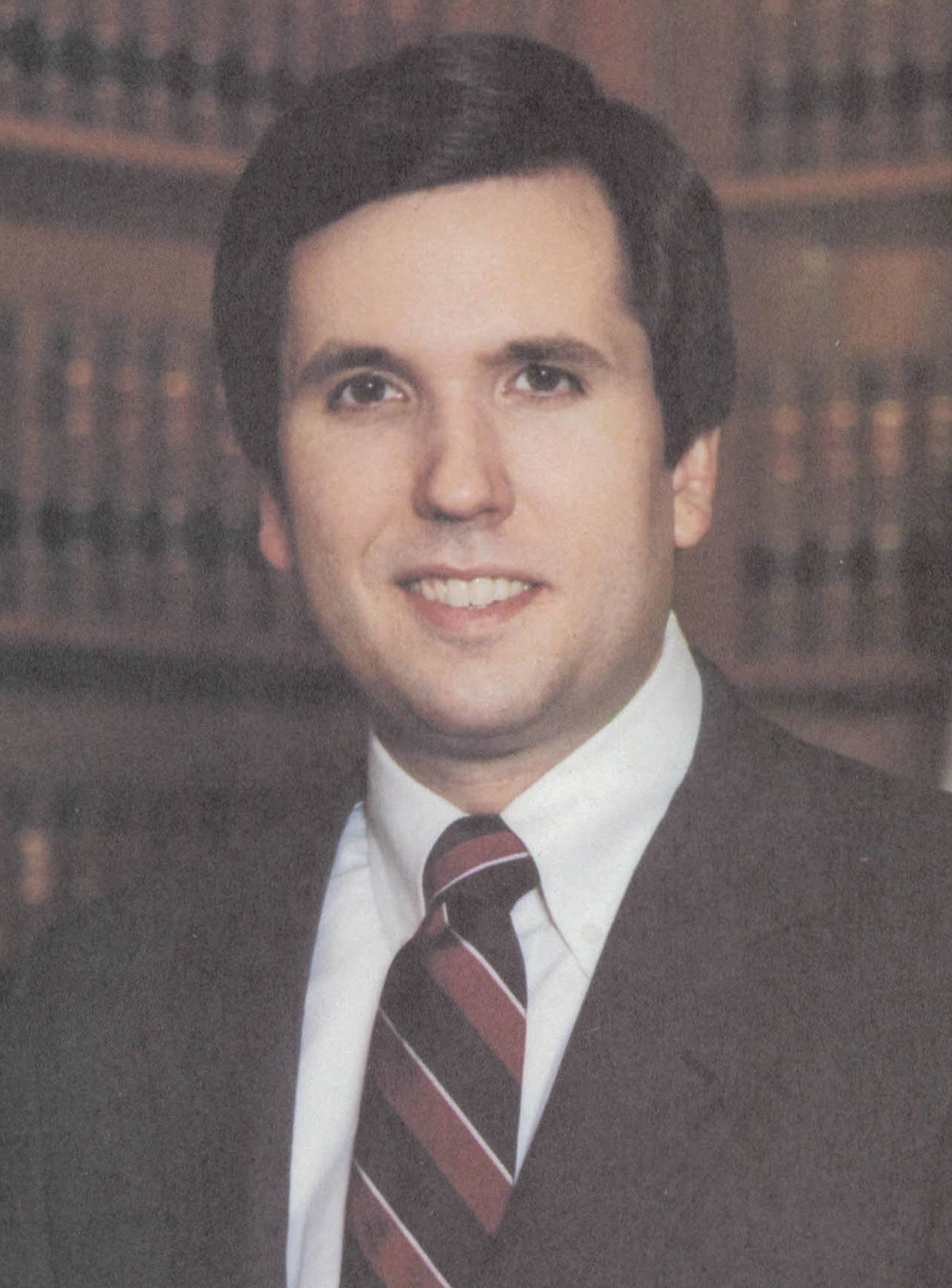

Nominee	William L. Webster	Richard P. Beard
Party	Republican	Democratic
Popular vote	1,131,715	901,394
Percentage	55.66%	44.34%
Attorney General before election
John Ashcroft
Republican
Elected Attorney General
William L. Webster
Republican

The 1984 Missouri Attorney General election was held on November 6, 1984, in order to elect the attorney general of Missouri. Republican nominee and incumbent member of the Missouri House of Representatives William L. Webster defeated Democratic nominee and fellow incumbent member of the Missouri House of Representatives Richard P. Beard.

== General election ==
On election day, November 6, 1984, Republican nominee William L. Webster won the election by a margin of 230,321 votes against his opponent Democratic nominee Richard P. Beard, thereby retaining Republican control over the office of attorney general. Webster was sworn in as the 39th attorney general of Missouri on January 8, 1985.

=== Results ===
Missouri Attorney General election, 1984
Party	Candidate	Votes	%
Republican	William L. Webster	1,131,715	55.66
Democratic	Richard P. Beard	901,394	44.34
Total votes		2,033,109	100.00
Republican hold			

== See also ==
- 1984 Missouri gubernatorial election
