= 1992 Missouri gubernatorial election =

- November 3, 1992
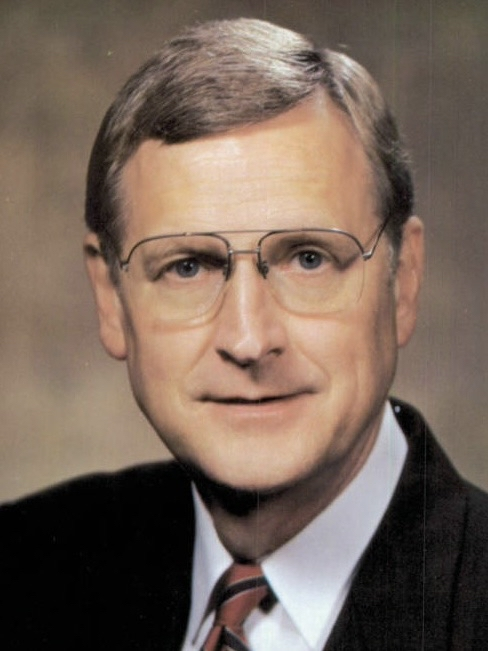

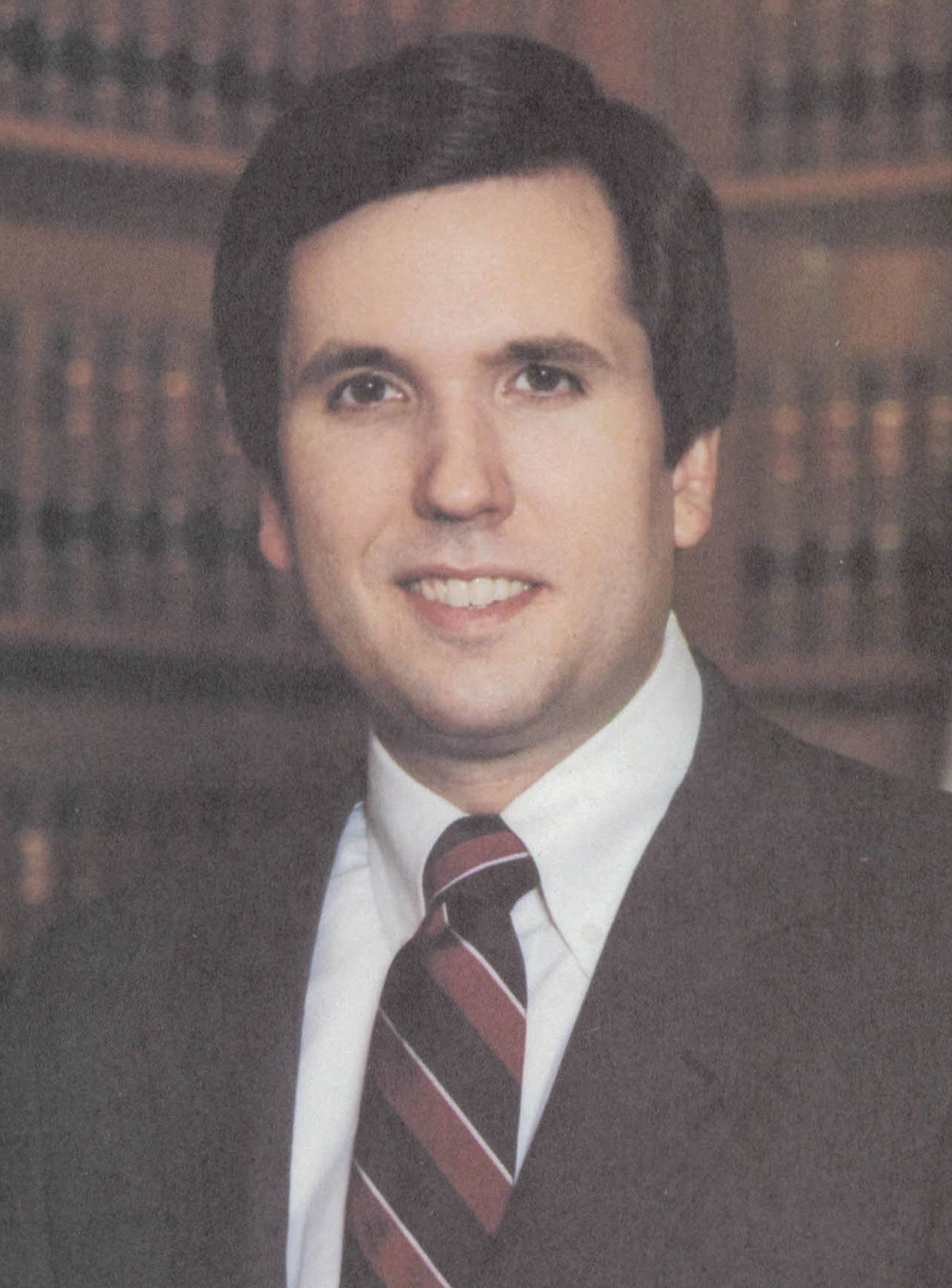
| Nominee | Mel Carnahan | William L. Webster |
| Party | Democratic | Republican |
| Popular vote | 1,375,425 | 968,574 |
| Percentage | 58.68% | 41.32% |
- County results Carnahan: 50–60% 60–70% 70–80% Webster: 50–60% 60–70% Tie: 50–50%
Governor before election
John Ashcroft
Republican
Elected Governor
Mel Carnahan
Democratic

The 1992 Missouri gubernatorial election was held on November 3, 1992, and resulted in a victory for the Democratic nominee, Lt. Governor Mel Carnahan, over the Republican candidate, Missouri Attorney General William L. Webster, and Libertarian Joan Dow. Carnahan had defeated St. Louis mayor Vincent C. Schoemehl for the Democratic nomination, while Webster had defeated Secretary of State Roy Blunt and Treasurer Wendell Bailey for the Republican nomination.

== Background ==
The Democratic Party dominated Missouri politics in the 1950s and 1960s, but declined in the 1970s. The Democrats only won one statewide office, the position of lieutenant governor, in the 1984 and 1988 elections as the Republicans won the rest of the statewide elections. Governor John Ashcroft was ineligible to seek reelection to a third term due to term limits.

== Democratic primary ==
=== Candidates ===
- Mel Carnahan, Lieutenant Governor of Missouri, former State Treasurer and candidate for Governor in 1984
- Anthony Cox
- Elmer Dapron
- Cedric Hawkins
- Mary Johnson
- Sharon Rogers
- Vincent C. Schoemehl, mayor of St. Louis since 1981

Declined

- Dick Gephardt, member of the United States House of Representatives from Missouri's 3rd congressional district (1977–2005)

=== Campaign ===
Lieutenant Governor Mel Carnahan was the only Democrat to win a statewide election in 1988.

Carnahan's first campaign manager was his daughter Robin Carnahan. She was replaced by Celia Fischer and then Marc Farinella. Carnahan raised $1.7 million in 1992, and ended with $130,000 in debt after the primary.

Schoemehl's campaign was managed by E.C. Walker, but the majority of the management was done by Nancy Rice. He raised $1.56 million in 1991, with one-fourth coming from labor groups or individuals. Two-thirds of his contributions came from the St. Louis metropolitan area and $400,000 came from out of state. John E. Connelly donated around $50,000 to his campaign. He raised $2.3 million in 1992, and ended with $153,000 in debt.

Since 1988, Carnahan and Schoemehl had been pegged as top contenders for the Governor's race. Carnahan was perceived by many as dull, and a weak candidate. In contrast Shoemehl was thought to be the younger and more charismatic candidate. He was thought to be the frontrunner for a time, though was noted for a propensity for harsh outbursts.

Schoemehl attacked Carnahan as an out of touch politician from the past, and Carnahan would respond with attacks of Schoemehl as a big city politician who would never garner statewide support. These charges became relevant when Schoemehl referred to him as "some redneck from Rolla", attacks which Carnahan claimed reflected how his opponent truly viewed rural Missourians. This incident would be used part of a larger attack on Schoemehl and his tendency for offensive outbursts.

In terms of issues, education funding was central to the campaign. Carnahan favored a plan of a $200 million tax increase for education funding, but Schoemehl favored cutting back on state bureaucracy to raise funds. On the issue of abortion, Schoemehl had been personally opposed to abortion, in contrast to Carnahan who was unequivocally pro-choice.

=== Endorsements ===
Mel Carnahan

U.S. Congress

- Bill Clay, member of the United States House of Representatives from Missouri's 1st congressional district (1969–2001)

Newspapers

- The Kansas City Star
- Moberly Monitor-Index
- Warrensburg Star-Journal
Vincent Schoemehl

Organizations

- AFL-CIO
- American Federation of State, County and Municipal Employees
- Missouri National Education Association
- United Auto Workers

Newspapers

- Columbia Daily Tribune
- The Joplin Globe
- Rolla Daily News
- Springfield News-Leader
- St. Louis Post-Dispatch

=== Polling ===
| Poll source | Date(s) administered | Sample size | Margin of error | Mel Carnahan | Vincent Schoemehl | Other / Undecided |
|---|---|---|---|---|---|---|
| Mason-Dixon Polling & Strategy | February 1992 | 380 | | 41% | 23% | 36% |
| St. Louis Post-Dispatch/KMOX | June 14–22, 1992 | 282 | | 32% | 33% | 34% |
| St. Louis Post-Dispatch/KMOX | July 27–August 1, 1992 | 478 | | 40% | 28% | 32% |

=== Results ===
Carnahan had led in most polls, but at the end, the race was close, and Schoemehl had an advantage in fundraising. Carnahan won every county except for Ste. Genevieve County. Schoemehl would concede and offered his support to the Lt. Governor. Schoemehl lost both St. Louis and St. Louis County. He won seven of St. Louis' twenty-eight wards and won his home ward by 28 votes. Carnahan spent around $5 per vote while Schoemehl spent around $17 per vote.

1992 Democratic gubernatorial primary
| Party | Candidate | Votes | % |
|---|---|---|---|
| Democratic | Mel Carnahan | 388,098 | 55.36% |
| Democratic | Vince Schoemehl | 235,652 | 33.62% |
| Democratic | Sharon Rogers | 35,104 | 5.01% |
| Democratic | Mary Johnson | 22,273 | 3.18% |
| Democratic | Anthony Cox | 11,514 | 1.64% |
| Democratic | Elmer Dapron | 4,328 | 0.62% |
| Democratic | Cedric Hawkins | 4,019 | 0.57% |
| Total votes | | 700,988 | 100.0% |

== Republican primary ==
=== Candidates ===
- Wendell Bailey, Missouri Treasurer since 1985
- Roy Blunt, Missouri Secretary of State since 1985
- Fred Salmon
- Dwight Watts
- William L. Webster, Attorney General since 1985

=== Campaign ===
Hillard Selck, the former chair of the Missouri Republican Party, organized a Draft Webster movement in February 1989. Webster's campaign was managed by Tony Feather, who resigned as executive director of the Missouri Republican Party to accept the job, and employed Rich Galen as a press secretary. His campaign raised $4 million over the course of two years, with over $250,000 coming from his hometown of Joplin, Missouri and $435,000 being raised after he announced his candidacy. William Pagano, the former police chief of Festus, Missouri that was convicted of murder, donated $34,000 to him between 1984 and 1989. Webster's campaign started running ads in rural areas on March 17 while Blunt started in June.

Blunt's campaign was managed by Tom Dueschle, who managed Ashcroft's campaign in 1988, and employed Roger Ailes. His campaign raised $2.5 million and had $130,000 in debt at the end of the campaign. His largest financial supporter was $105,000 in contributions and $200,000 in loans from Midland Bank, which was managed by his brother.

Bailey's campaign was managed by Ken Allen and Chris Molendorp worked as finance director. His campaign raised around $700,000 and had $21,000 in debt at the end of the campaign. On August 4, 1991, he stopped accepting contributions greater than $100.

Webster spent around $22 per vote he received, Blunt spent around $15, and Bailey spent around $10.

Webster book, Bill Webster's Blueprint for Missouri's Future, was criticized by The Kansas City Star due to its similarities to Reinventing Government by David Osborne and Ted Gaebler. Bailey later added a listing of important sources for the book. Bailey stated that "It's just out and out tripe and I feel better to know he didn't write it."

At the start of the primary, the consensus among Republicans was that one of the major candidates would emerge to become the next governor. Webster was the leading candidate, but Blunt's base in conservative southwest Missouri and Bailey's personable nature meant they were all formidable candidates. However, owing to this competitive nature, the primary was marred by the foibles of each candidate. For example, Bailey was detained by the FBI for carrying a pistol in an airport, an incident which was seen as derailing to his campaign.

Among the frontrunners Blunt and Webster, word would soon emerge of Webster's involvement in a corruption scandal involving the Second Injury Fund, a state workers compensation program. The investigation, originally started in the St. Louis Post-Dispatch, showed among other things, lawyers who contributed to Webster's campaign received larger settlements. The investigation would eventually expand to an investigation by a federal grand jury. Webster would attack an opponent, possibly Blunt, for leaking the story to the press that he was being investigated by a grand jury.

The scandal would become central to Blunt's campaign, who hired Ailes to make an ad featuring wealthy businessmen on a merry go round, drawing attention to the scandal. However, Webster responded with an attack on Blunt for supposedly printing the official state manual of Missouri in Indiana.

The primary was not completely about personalities. One issue which became a focal point was abortion. Blunt was anti-abortion, as was Webster, who argued a case before the Supreme Court upholding Missouri's abortion restrictions. Bailey, however was pro-choice, distinguishing him from the rest of the field. Bailey previously opposed abortion rights during the 1988 election.

=== Endorsements ===
Wendell Bailey

Organizations

- NARAL

Newspapers

- Columbia Daily Tribune (also recommended Blunt)
- St. Louis Post-Dispatch

Notable people

- Ana Stone, chair of the Republicans for Choice
Roy Blunt

Newspapers

- Columbia Daily Tribune (also recommended Bailey)
- The Kansas City Star
- Rolla Daily News
- Springfield News-Leader
- Warrensburg Star-Journal

=== Polling ===
| Poll source | Date(s) administered | Sample size | Margin of error | Wendell Bailey | Roy Blunt | William Webster | Other / Undecided |
|---|---|---|---|---|---|---|---|
| Webster internal | December 1991 | | | 10% | 27% | 39% | 24% |
| Mason-Dixon Polling & Strategy | February 1992 | 217 | | 13% | 25% | 41% | 21% |
| St. Louis Post-Dispatch/KMOX | June 14–22, 1992 | 237 | | 8% | 18% | 45% | 28% |
| St. Louis Post-Dispatch/KMOX | July 28–31, 1992 | 318 | | 13% | 30% | 31% | 25% |

=== Results ===
Webster won the primary by a narrow margin.

1992 Republican gubernatorial primary
| Party | Candidate | Votes | % |
|---|---|---|---|
| Republican | William L. Webster | 183,968 | 43.79% |
| Republican | Roy Blunt | 163,719 | 38.97% |
| Republican | Wendell Bailey | 63,481 | 15.11% |
| Republican | Dwight Watts | 5,019 | 1.19% |
| Republican | Fred Salmon | 3,958 | 0.94% |
| Total votes | | 420,145 | 100.0% |

== General election ==
=== Candidates ===
- Mel Carnahan, Lieutenant Governor of Missouri and former Treasurer (Democratic)
- Joan Dow (Libertarian, write-in)
- William L. Webster, Attorney General of Missouri (Republican)

=== Results ===
Despite the fact that Webster had wide recognition serving as the Attorney General of Missouri, he was handily defeated in a 17% margin of victory for Carnahan. Carnahan won the typically Democratic strongholds such as St. Louis and Kansas City, but also performed surprisingly well in most of rural Missouri. A factor in this was the issue of abortion, an issue which Webster found himself at a disadvantage owing to shifting support for pro-choice policies. Carnahan's victory was likely aided in Bill Clinton's concurrent win in Missouri in the 1992 presidential election. Webster conceded defeat soon after the polls closed. This was a Democratic flip in the 1992 election cycle. Webster would be tried and convicted for his role in the Second Injury Fund scandal.

The Democrats won in all of the other concurrent statewide elections except for the U.S. Senate election.

1992 Missouri gubernatorial election
| Party | Candidate | Votes | % | ±% |
|---|---|---|---|---|
| Democratic | Mel Carnahan | 1,375,425 | 58.68 | +23.93 |
| Republican | William L. Webster | 968,574 | 41.32 | −22.90 |
| Libertarian | Joan Dow (write-in) | 66 | 0.00 | −1.03 |
| Majority | | 406,851 | 17.36 | −12.10 |
| Turnout | | 2,344,065 | 45.81 | +3.38 |
| Democratic gain from Republican | | Swing | | |

== Works cited ==
- Leuthold, David (1994). Campaign Missouri 1992. University of Missouri Press. ISBN 0826209777.
