= 2000 Missouri Attorney General election =

- November 7, 2000
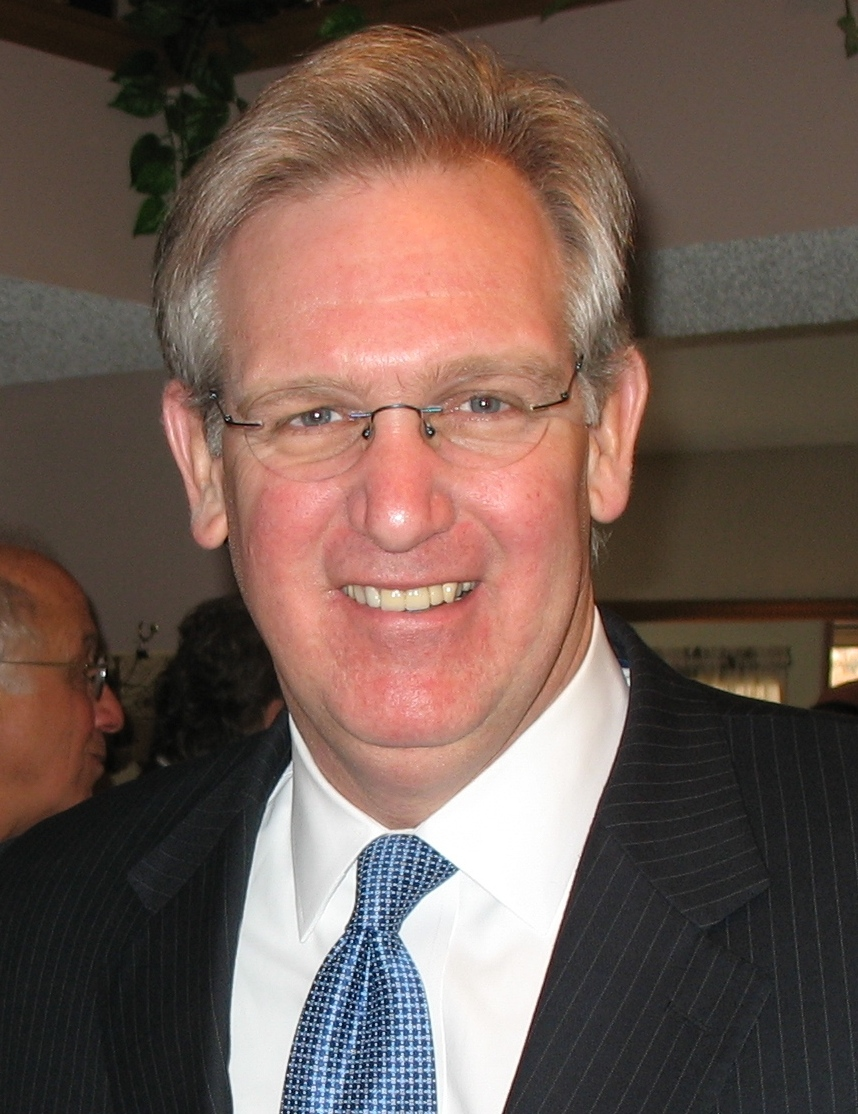

Nominee	Jay Nixon	Sam Jones
Party	Democratic	Republican
Popular vote	1,378,296	855,814
Percentage	60.25%	37.41%
- County results Nixon: 40–50% 50–60% 60–70% 80–90% Jones: 40–50% 50–60% 60–70%
Attorney General before election
Jay Nixon
Democratic
Elected Attorney General
Jay Nixon
Democratic

The 2000 Missouri Attorney General election was held on November 7, 2000, in order to elect the attorney general of Missouri. Democratic nominee and incumbent attorney general Jay Nixon defeated Republican nominee Sam Jones and Libertarian nominee Mitchell J. Moore.

== General election ==
On election day, November 7, 2000, Democratic nominee Jay Nixon won re-election by a margin of 522,482 votes against his foremost opponent Republican nominee Sam Jones, thereby retaining Democratic control over the office of attorney general. Nixon was sworn in for his third term on January 8, 2001.

=== Results ===
Missouri Attorney General election, 2000
Party	Candidate	Votes	%
Democratic	Jay Nixon (incumbent)	1,378,296	60.25
Republican	Sam Jones	855,814	37.41
Libertarian	Mitchell J. Moore	53,363	2.34
Total votes		2,287,473	100.00
Democratic hold			

== See also ==
- 2000 Missouri gubernatorial election
