= 1988 United States Senate election in Missouri =

- November 8, 1988
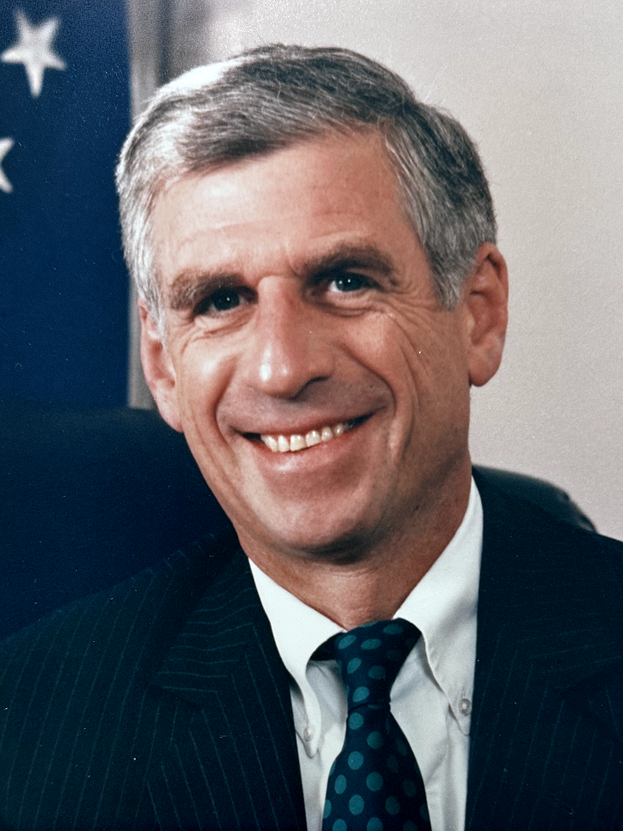

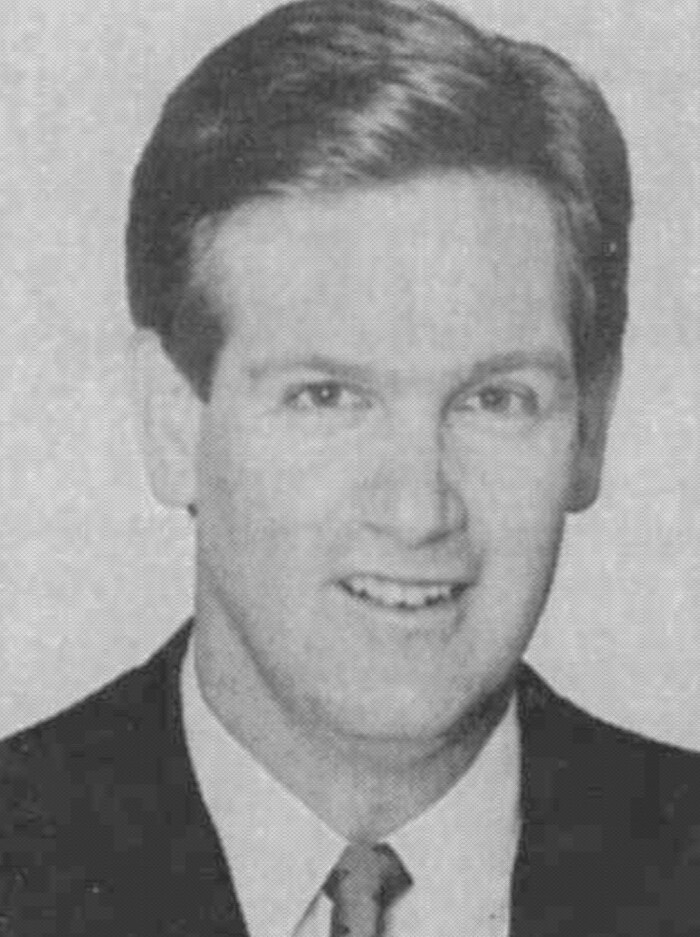
Nominee	John Danforth	Jay Nixon
Party	Republican	Democratic
Popular vote	1,407,416	660,045
Percentage	67.70%	31.75%
- County results Danforth: 50–60% 60–70% 70–80% 80–90% Nixon: 50–60%
U.S. senator before election
John Danforth
Republican
Elected U.S. Senator
John Danforth
Republican

The 1988 United States Senate election in Missouri was held on November 8, 1988 to select the U.S. Senator from the state of Missouri. Incumbent Republican U.S. Senator John Danforth won re-election. He defeated Democratic State Senator Jay Nixon, who would later be elected Attorney General of Missouri in 1992, and Governor of Missouri in 2008.

== General election ==
=== Candidates ===
- John Danforth, incumbent U.S. Senator since 1977 (Republican)
- John Guze (Libertarian)
- Jay Nixon, State Senator from Jefferson County (Democratic)

== Results ==
Missouri United States Senate election, 1988
Party	Candidate	Votes	%
Republican	John Danforth (incumbent)	1,407,416	67.70
Democratic	Jay Nixon	660,045	31.75
Libertarian	John Guze	11,410	0.55
	Write-In Candidates	4	0.00
Majority		747,371	35.95
Turnout		2,078,875	
Republican hold			

== See also ==
- 1988 United States Senate elections
