= 2004 Missouri Attorney General election =

- November 2, 2004
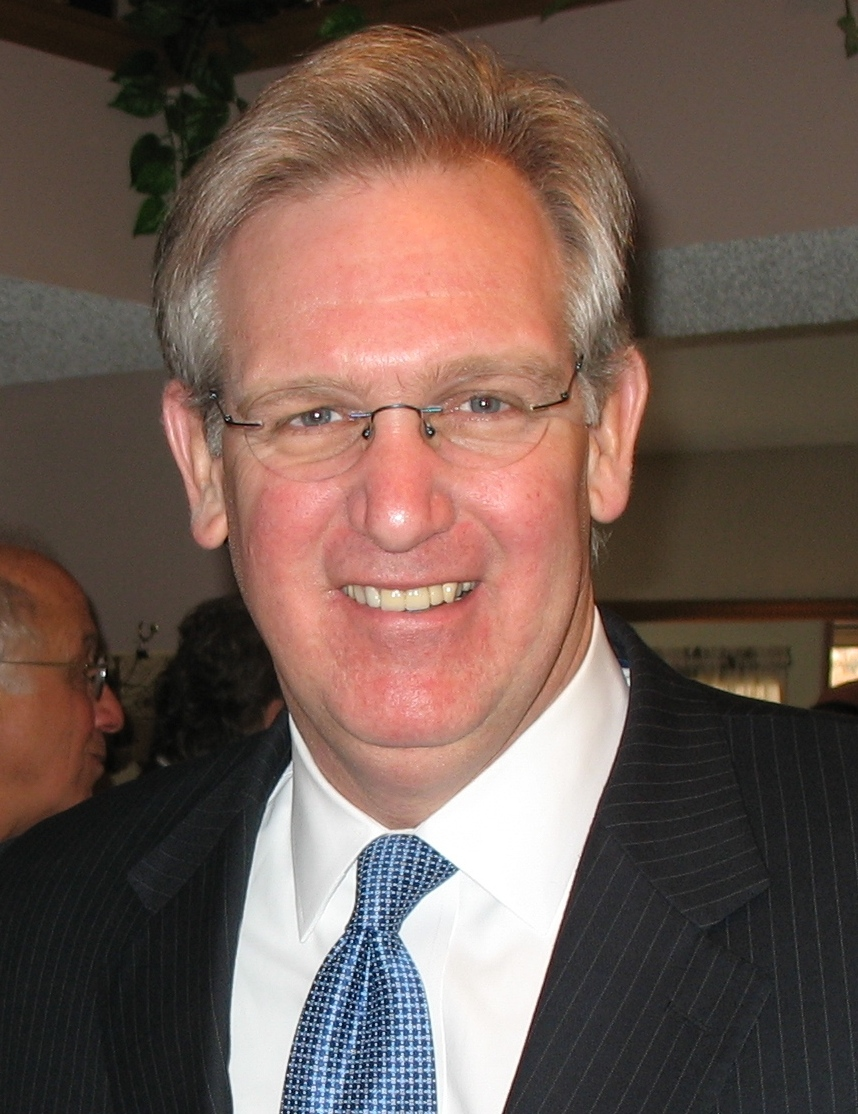

Nominee	Jay Nixon	Chris Byrd
Party	Democratic	Republican
Popular vote	1,592,842	1,000,503
Percentage	59.96%	37.65%
- County results Nixon: 50–60% 60–70% 80–90% Byrd: 40–50% 50–60% 60–70%
Attorney General before election
Jay Nixon
Democratic
Elected Attorney General
Jay Nixon
Democratic

The 2004 Missouri Attorney General election was held on November 2, 2004, in order to elect the attorney general of Missouri. Democratic nominee and incumbent attorney general Jay Nixon defeated Republican nominee Chris Byrd, Libertarian nominee David R. Browning and Constitution nominee David Fry.

== General election ==
On election day, November 2, 2004, Democratic nominee Jay Nixon won re-election by a margin of 592,339 votes against his foremost opponent Republican nominee Chris Byrd, thereby retaining Democratic control over the office of attorney general. Nixon was sworn in for his fourth term on January 10, 2005.

=== Results ===
Missouri Attorney General election, 2004
Party	Candidate	Votes	%
Democratic	Jay Nixon (incumbent)	1,592,842	59.96
Republican	Chris Byrd	1,000,503	37.65
Libertarian	David R. Browning	43,538	1.64
Constitution	David Fry	19,802	0.75
Total votes		2,656,685	100.00
Democratic hold			

== See also ==
- 2004 Missouri gubernatorial election
