= MIAC =

MIAC may refer to:

- Military–industrial–academic complex
- Ministry of Internal Affairs and Communications, Japan's interior ministry
  - Minister for Internal Affairs and Communications, the minister of the above
- Minnesota Indian Affairs Council, a liaison between the government of Minnesota and the Native American tribes in the state
- Minnesota Intercollegiate Athletic Conference, a college athletic conference which competes in the NCAA's Division III
- Missouri Information Analysis Center, a fusion center collecting data from the Department of Homeland Security and local agencies to help Missouri police
- Museum of Indian Arts and Culture, Santa Fe, New Mexico
