= Jay Nixon =

Governor of Missouri from 2009 to 2017

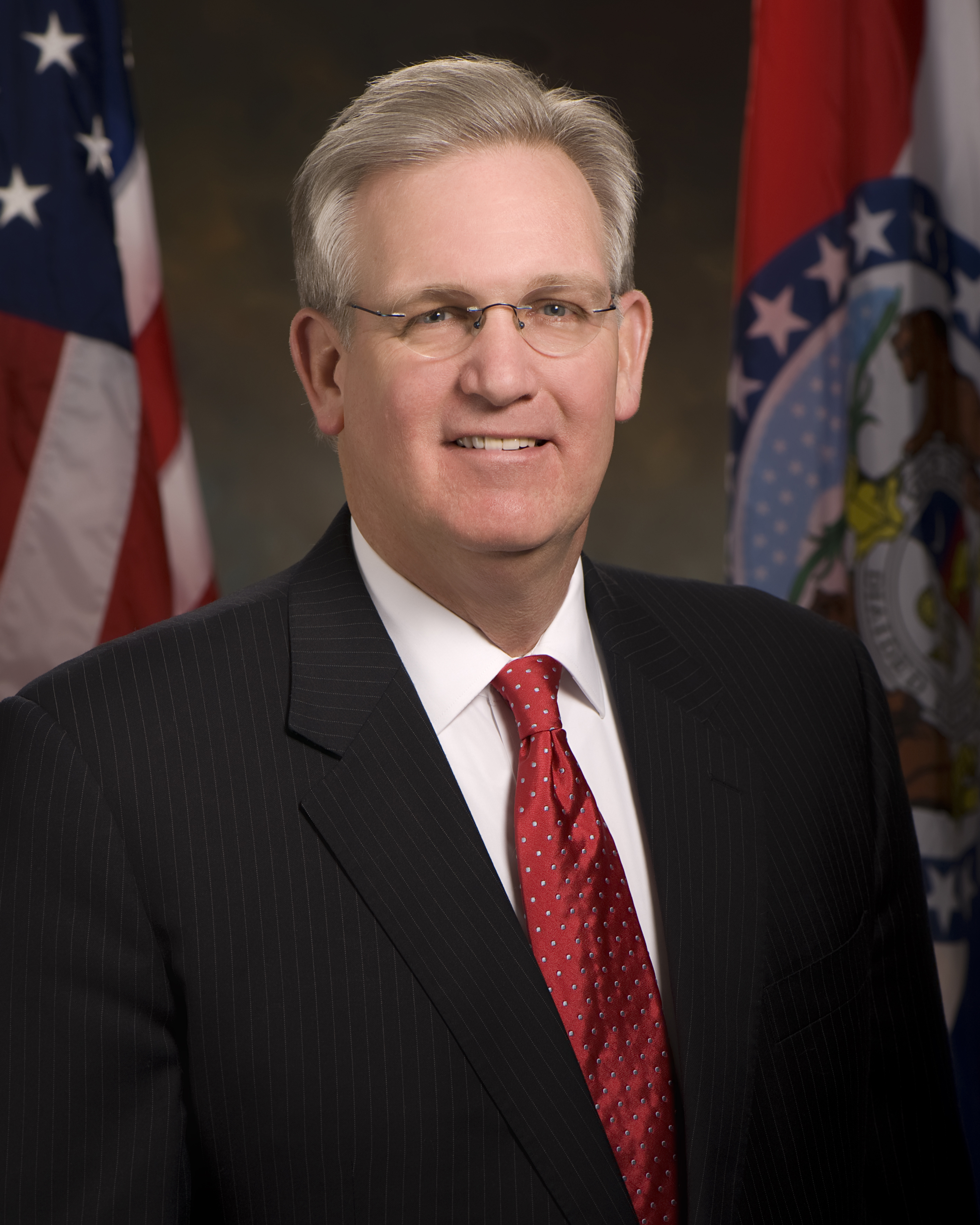
- Official portrait, 2008

55th Governor of Missouri
- In office January 12, 2009 – January 9, 2017
- Lieutenant: Peter Kinder
- Preceded by: Matt Blunt
- Succeeded by: Eric Greitens

40th Attorney General of Missouri
- In office January 11, 1993 – January 12, 2009
- Governor: Mel Carnahan; Roger Wilson; Bob Holden; Matt Blunt
- Preceded by: William L. Webster
- Succeeded by: Chris Koster

Member of the Missouri Senate from the 22nd district
- In office January 7, 1987 – January 11, 1993
- Preceded by: Jack Gannon
- Succeeded by: William McKenna

Personal details
- Born: Jeremiah Wilson Nixon; February 13, 1956 (age 70) De Soto, Missouri, U.S.
- Party: Democratic
- Spouse: Georganne Wheeler
- Children: 2
- Education: University of Missouri (BA, JD)

Jeremiah Wilson "Jay" Nixon (born February 13, 1956) is an American lawyer and politician who served as the 55th governor of Missouri from 2009 to 2017. A member of the Democratic Party, he previously served as the 40th Missouri Attorney General from 1993 to 2009 and as a Missouri state senator from 1987 to 1993.

Born and raised in the city of De Soto, Nixon attended the University of Missouri and graduated with a degree in political science. He first entered politics at age 30 after he was elected to the Missouri Senate to represent Jefferson County. After an unsuccessful campaign for the U.S. Senate in 1988, he was elected Missouri Attorney General in 1992 and reelected in 1996. Following another failed U.S. Senate bid in 1998, he was reelected attorney general twice more in 2000 and 2004, serving a total of four terms, the longest tenure for an attorney general in state history.

In 2008, Nixon was elected governor in a landslide victory over Republican congressman Kenny Hulshof, and he was reelected in 2012. He was term limited in 2016 and was succeeded by Republican Eric Greitens. As of 2025, he is the most recent Democrat to serve as the governor of Missouri. After leaving public office he joined the Dowd Bennett law firm in St. Louis.

== Early life and education ==
Nixon was born and raised in De Soto, Missouri. His mother, Betty Lea Nixon (née Wilson), was a teacher and president of the local school board, and his father, Jeremiah "Jerry" Nixon, served as the city's mayor. One of his three paternal great-grandfathers, Abraham Jonas, was an early Jewish settler in Illinois and friend of former President Abraham Lincoln (one of Nixon's paternal great-grandmothers was Jewish, though Nixon is Methodist). His great-great-grandfather Charles Henry Jonas was the brother of Democratic U.S. Senator Benjamin F. Jonas of Louisiana and another, James Oscar Nixon, was a brother of U.S. Representative John Thompson Nixon of New Jersey. Another paternal ancestor, John Inskeep, served as Mayor of Philadelphia (from 1800 to 1801 and 1805 to 1806).

Nixon graduated with honors from the University of Missouri with a degree in political science. He worked at various construction jobs before receiving his Juris Doctor degree from the University of Missouri School of Law.

== State legislature ==
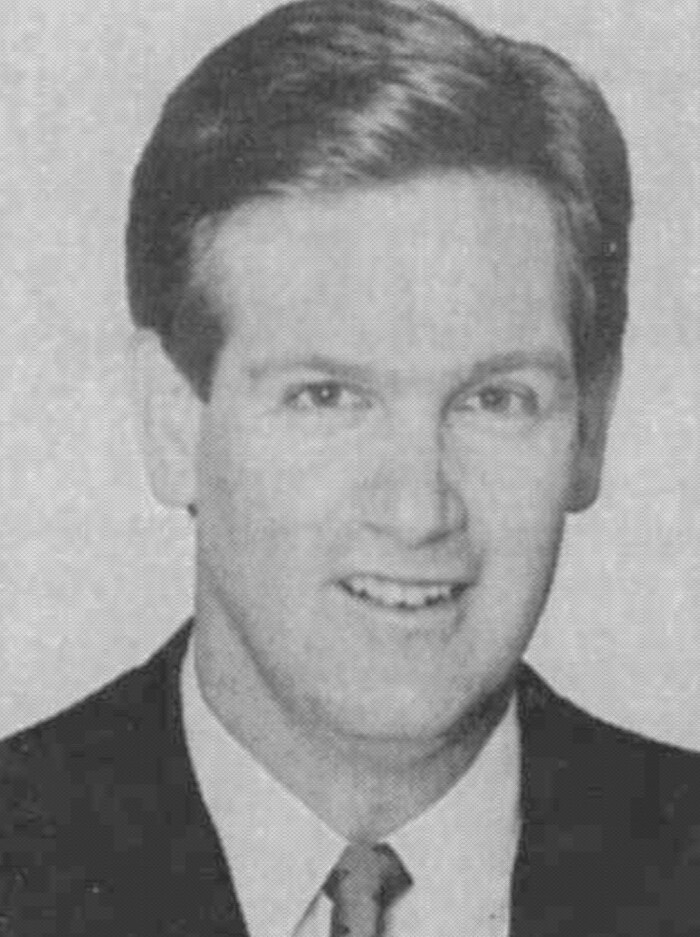
Nixon's portrait during his legislative tenure

In 1986, after a period of private practice in his hometown, Nixon ran for the Missouri Senate from a district in Jefferson County. He won an upset victory in the Democratic primary against two longtime Jefferson County lawmakers and defeated his Republican opponent, Larry Callahan, in the general election with 64 percent of the vote. When the new Congress convened on January 7, 1987, Nixon was the only freshman member. Nine days after his swearing in, Nixon introduced his first piece of legislation with a bill that would allow schools to purchase satellite dishes in order to provide better broadcasts. Later that year, he received an award as an outstanding legislator from the Judicial Conference of Missouri.

In April 1987, Nixon expressed interest in running for the United States Senate in the 1988 election. Some members of the Missouri Democratic Party considered him a worthy candidate, given his upset victory for the state senate, but some remained critical of his lack of political experience. Nixon made his decision official when he announced his candidacy on October 6. He was endorsed by the National Committee to Preserve Social Security and Medicare (NCPSSM); Nixon welcomed the endorsement, but opponents criticized him for accepting an endorsement from a group "that has been roundly condemned by Missouri newspapers for using scare tactics and misleading information". Nixon lost the general election to Republican incumbent John Danforth by a wide margin. During the campaign, Danforth outspent Nixon 5–1 through Political Action Committees (PACs).

In 1989, Nixon sponsored a bill that would mandate businesses with at least 25 employees to give pregnant workers maternity leave, but the Senate voted 17–16 against the bill. Nixon re-introduced the legislation in 1990, and although the Senate approved the bill, Governor John Ashcroft vetoed it. Nixon was reelected in November 1990, defeating Richard Ford, a Republican from Cedar Hill.

== Missouri Attorney General ==
Nixon announced in September 1991 that he would run for state Attorney General. During the Democratic primary campaign, fellow Democrat Mike Wolff, a law professor who was also seeking the nomination, accused Nixon of using his political influence to get a consumer fraud complaint in 1988 dropped by then-Attorney General William Webster. Nixon denied Wolff's accusation and said that Wolff sounded "like a desperate candidate". Nixon won the Democratic nomination and general election against Republican David Steelman.

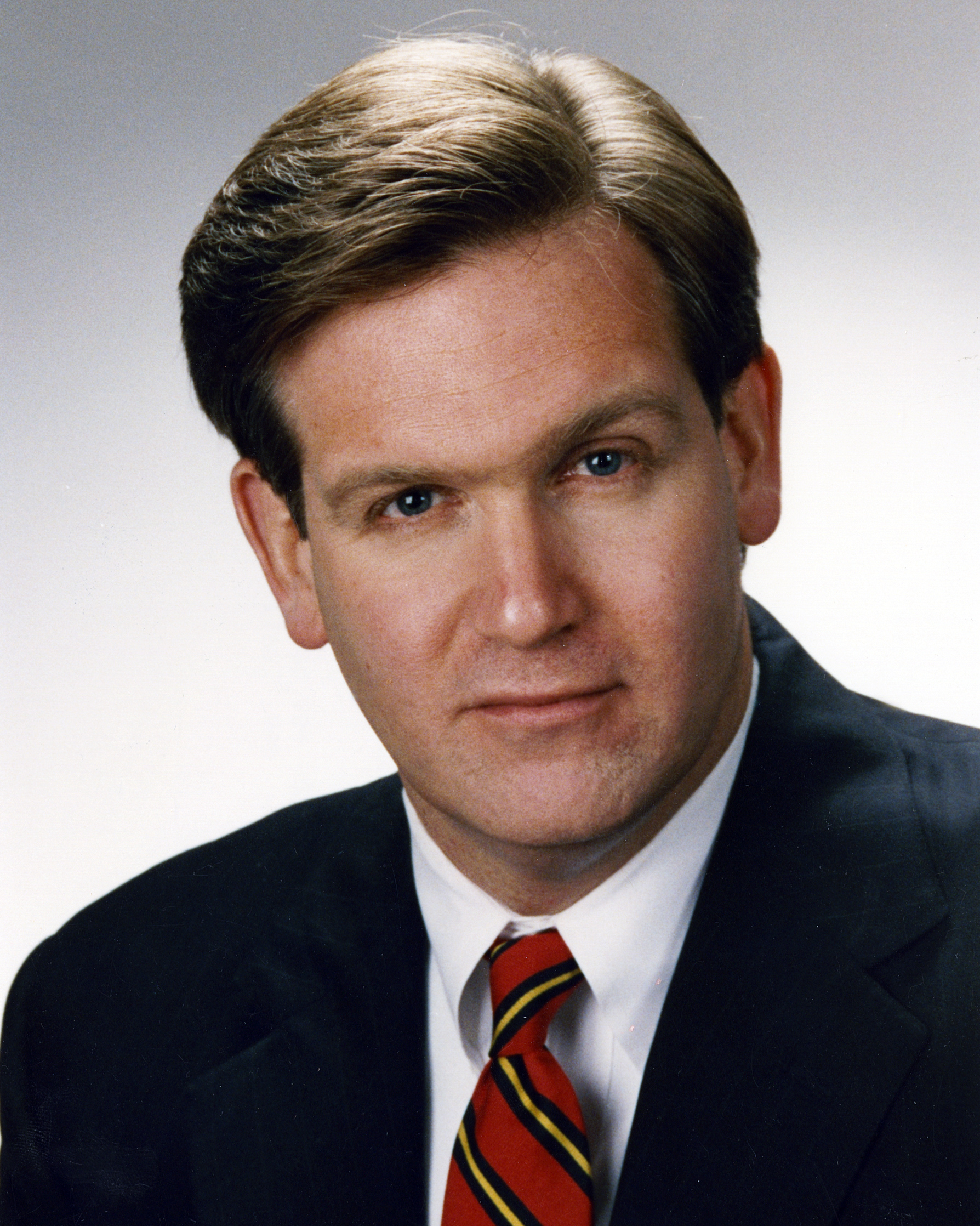
Nixon's portrait, 1993

As the state's Attorney General, Nixon created the Environmental Protection Division to enforce Missouri's environmental laws. Attorneys in this division take legal action to stop the pollution of the state's air, water and soil and to look after Missouri's agricultural interests. Successful litigation by the division has resulted in the cleanup of polluted sites and millions of dollars awarded to the state. His aggressive actions in the Attorney General's Office earned him national recognition. Barrister magazine named him one of the 20 outstanding young lawyers in the nation, and the Missouri Jaycees selected him one of Ten Outstanding Young Missourians. Prior to becoming Attorney General, he was recognized by the Conservation Federation of Missouri for his environmental work as a state senator.

In 1998, Nixon again unsuccessfully ran for the U.S. Senate, losing in the general election to Kit Bond. During his tenure as Attorney General, Nixon oversaw the state's involvement in the court settlements that ended mandatory urban busing in St. Louis and Kansas City's public schools. Nixon opposed the states desegregation programs, arguing that it would be a drain on states resources. This angered African-American leaders in the state, who refused to endorse him. Bond, a Republican, would go on to win a third of black voters, per exit polling.

During the 2000 election season, Nixon filed a writ of prohibition to prevent Edward Joseph Manley III, a candidate for Jefferson County sheriff, from appearing on the Democratic primary ballot. He argued that Manley's 1980 conviction for assault with intent to kill disqualified him from running for the position as per state law. Circuit court judge M. E. Williams, who had overseen the charges against Manley, ruled in favor of Nixon and removed Manley from appearing on the ballot.

Nixon argued to reinstate Missouri's campaign contribution limits to the United States Supreme Court in Nixon v. Shrink (2000), which was successful on his part.

In 2003, Nixon filed lawsuits against EchoStar and Xentel, two out-of-state businesses that allegedly made telemarketing calls to Missouri residents in violation of the state's "no call law". The following year, a state judge ordered Xentel to pay $75,000 to the state of Missouri, which they did. However, the company continued to call consumers within the state. In 2008, Xentel agreed to settle the lawsuit and paid Missouri $80,000.

The Missouri Information Analysis Center (MIAC) issued a report titled "The Modern Militia Movement" on February 20, 2009, informing the Missouri State Highway Patrol of several groups of people who could possibly be linked to domestic militia groups. According to the report, these groups included white Christians, supporters of third-party presidential candidates Ron Paul, Bob Barr, and Chuck Baldwin, as well as opponents of gun control, illegal immigration, abortion, the Federal Reserve System, and the Internal Revenue Service. Following a joint letter from Paul, Barr, and Baldwin condemning the report, Nixon and the MIAC issued an apology concerning the report and stated that it will no longer be displayed on any official state websites.

== Governor of Missouri ==
=== 2008 campaign ===
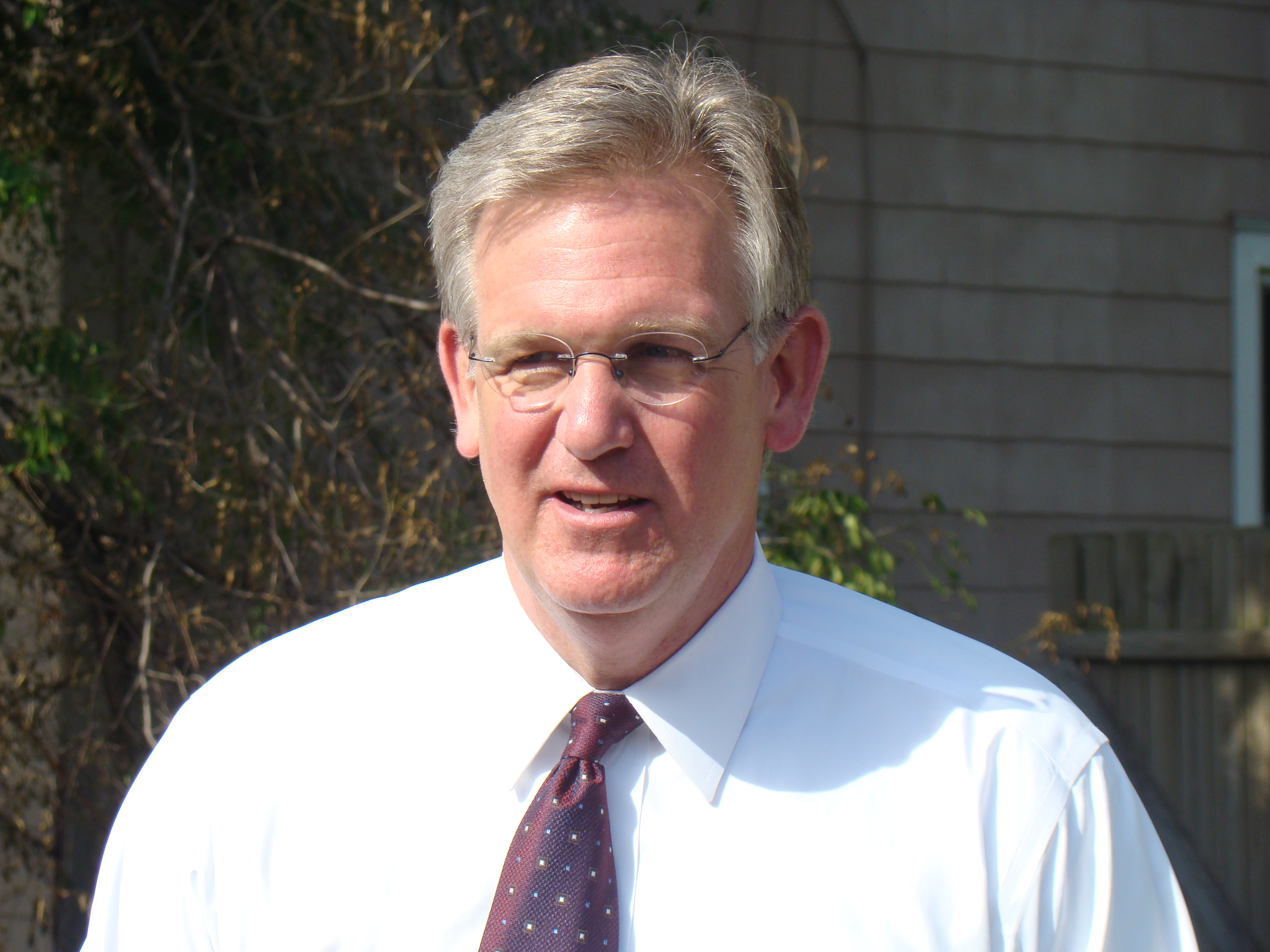
Nixon campaigning in 2008

In November 2005, Nixon filed with the Missouri Ethics Commission to launch a gubernatorial campaign. In a Research 2000 poll in January 2006, Nixon led over Republican Governor Matt Blunt by eight points. Blunt announced on January 22, 2008, that he would not seek a second term. By the filing deadline on March 25, 2008, three Democratic and five Republican candidates had filed.

Nixon won the Democratic nomination on August 5, the same day Kenny Hulshof won the Republican nomination. Pre-election polling showed Nixon regularly leading Hulshof, and he eventually opened up a 20-point lead two days before the election. On November 4, Nixon defeated Hulshof by a margin of 19 points. The election coincided with the 2008 presidential election, and despite Nixon's landslide win, Democratic presidential nominee Barack Obama lost Missouri to Republican John McCain.

=== First term (2009–2013) ===
Nixon was inaugurated as governor on January 12, 2009, sworn in by chief justice of the Missouri Supreme Court, Laura Denvir Stith.

Nixon took office amid the Great Recession, and to combat this he focused on creating jobs, investing in education, and strengthening the state's economy while keeping the budget in balance. In January 2009, Nixon proposed keeping the same funding level to public universities on behalf of the schools not increasing their tuition fees, which was generally met favorably. Nixon also negotiated four tuition freezes for students at public higher education institutions.

In July 2009, Nixon traveled to Iraq after the Department of Defense invited him to meet with U.S. soldiers. For security reasons, he did not disclose which military base he was staying at, other than it was in Kuwait. He traveled to Germany that same month before returning to Missouri on July 22.

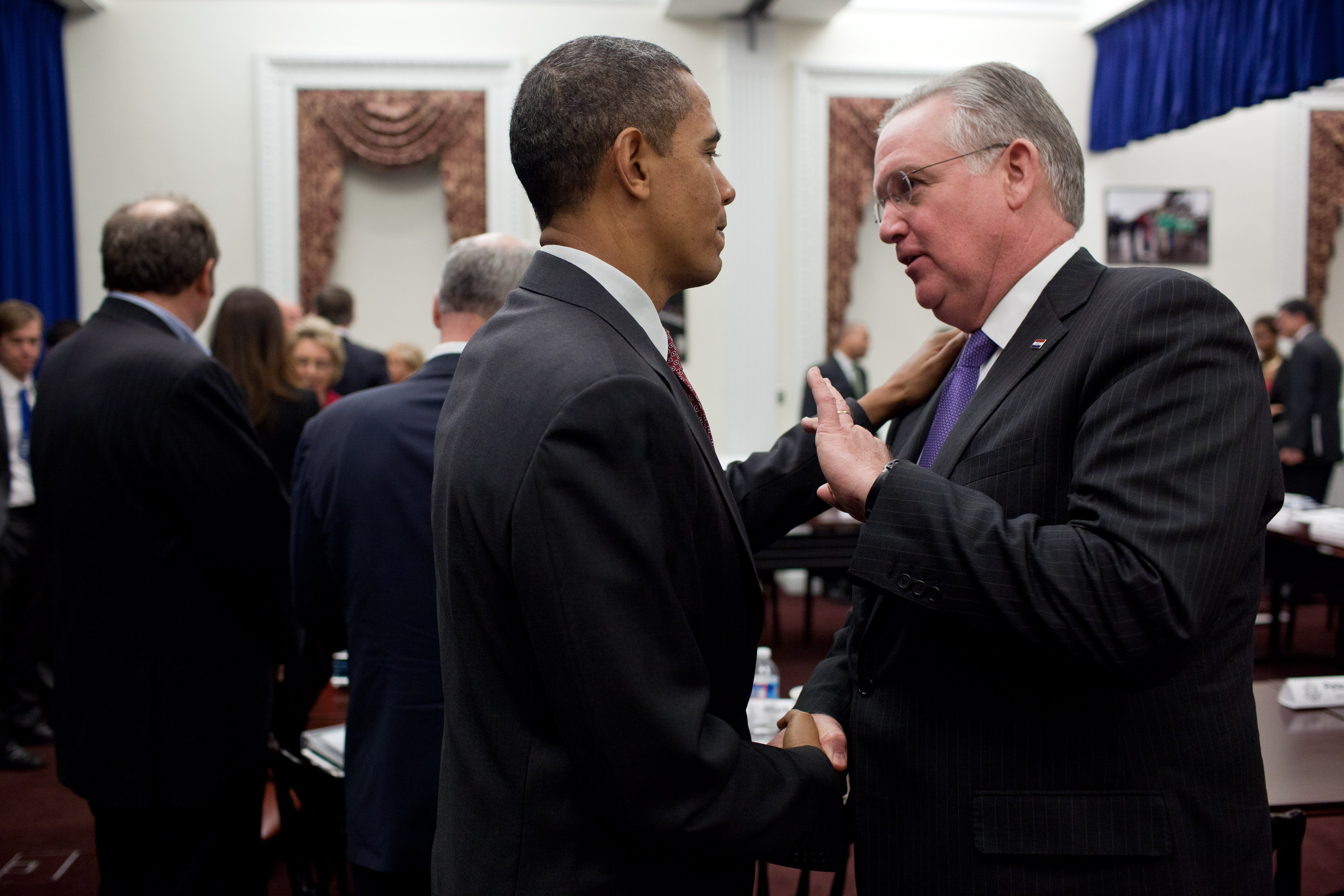
Nixon speaking to President Barack Obama in 2012

Upon taking office, Nixon "began cutting spending almost immediately and has made repeated reductions to the budgets passed by the Legislature in subsequent years." In 2010, Nixon was called the state's budget "cutter-in-chief" by the Associated Press for his efforts to reduce spending and right-size state government. Some of Nixon's budget restrictions drew criticism and in 2011 Missouri State Auditor Tom Schweich filed suit arguing that Nixon lacked the constitutional authority to restrict spending. Schweich's lawsuit was dismissed by the Missouri Supreme Court in 2013 but the following year the Missouri General Assembly passed and voters approved Amendment 10, granting legislators the ability to overrule a governor's budget restrictions.

Nixon drew praise for his handling of EF-5 tornado that struck Joplin on May 22, 2011. The Associated Press in 2011 called him "a ubiquitous commander of disasters."

Aiming to revitalize the state's automotive manufacturing industry, Nixon created an Automotive Jobs Task Force and in 2011 called a special session of the General Assembly to pass the Missouri Manufacturing Jobs Act. On October 21, 2011 Ford confirmed that it would make a $1.1 billion investment in its Kansas City Assembly Plant and add 1,600 jobs at the facility. On November 4, 2011 General Motors announced plans for a $380 million investment in its Wentzville plant outside St. Louis. The St. Louis Post Dispatch editorialized that "key to both Ford and GM agreeing to expand in the state were incentives championed in last year's Legislative special session by Gov. Jay Nixon, a Democrat, and the then-leaders of the House and Senate, Ron Richard and Charlie Shields, both Republicans."

=== Second term (2013–2017) ===
Running on a platform of fiscal responsibility and bipartisanship, Nixon was handily reelected in 2012 over Republican Dave Spence. He began his second term on January 14, 2013. In his inaugural address, he recalled Missouri's history as a Confederate State during the American Civil War while encouraging state Republicans and Democrats to unite for "the common good". In 2013, he joined with nine mayors to establish July 15 as Social Media Giving Day, encouraging citizens to support charities via social media.

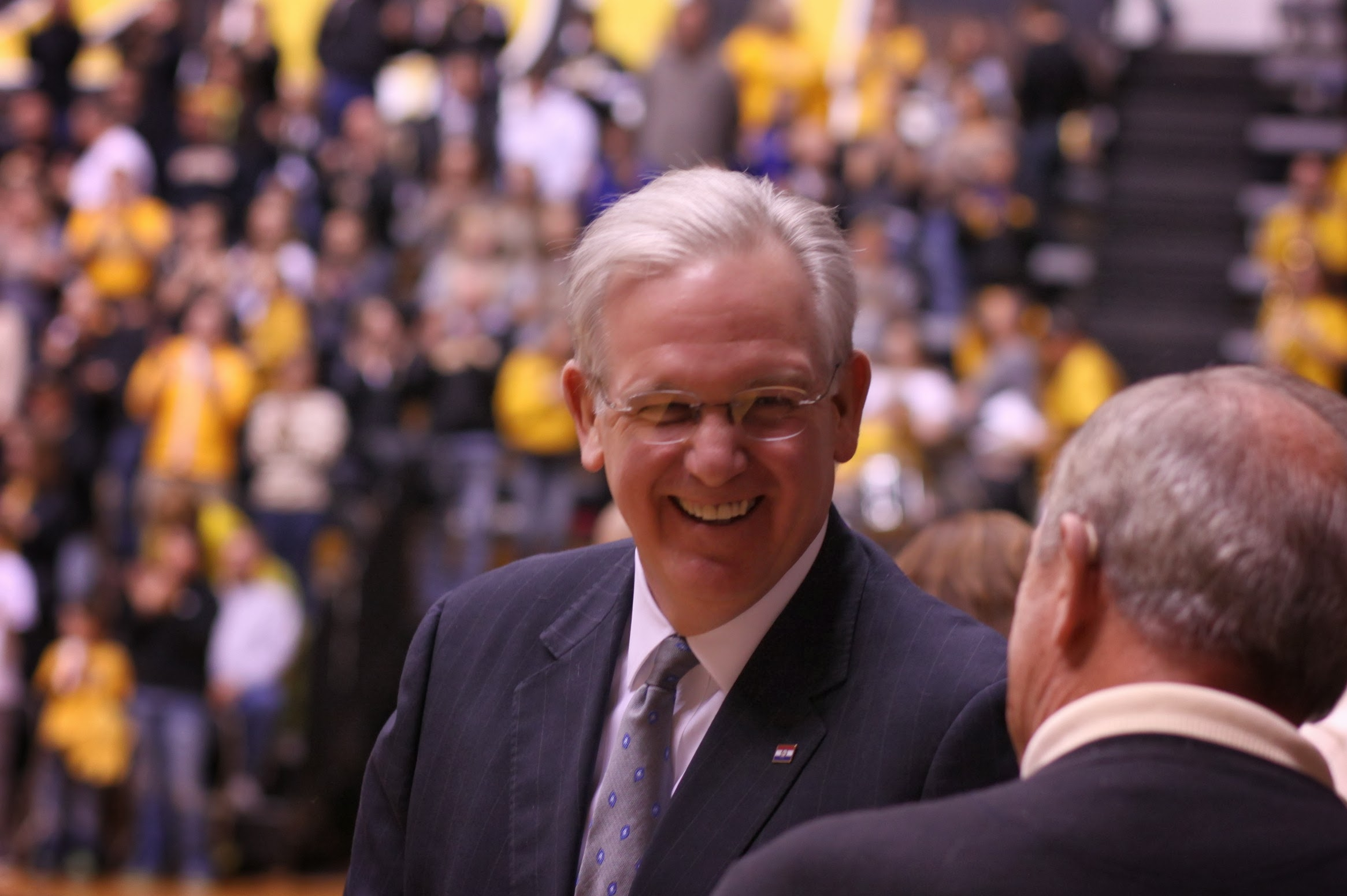
Nixon watches a Missouri Tigers volleyball game at the Hearnes Center, 2013.

Nixon's second term came with crisis following the August 9, 2014, shooting death of 18-year-old Michael Brown by Darren Wilson, a police officer with the Ferguson police department. Brown's death sparked a series of violence and protests throughout the city. Nixon declared a state of emergency on November 17 and called in the National Guard to help restore peace and order. However, the violence continued after Wilson was not indicted by a grand jury. On November 27, Nixon reportedly rejected calls for a new grand jury to decide whether to charge Wilson over Brown's killing. His gubernatorial approval ratings, which were routinely in the 50s, fell dramatically during the crisis, and by December his approval rating stood at just 28 percent.

Following the death of State Auditor Tom Schweich, Nixon appointed Boone County Treasurer Nicole Galloway to fill the post in 2015. Galloway later won a full term as state auditor in the 2018 general election.

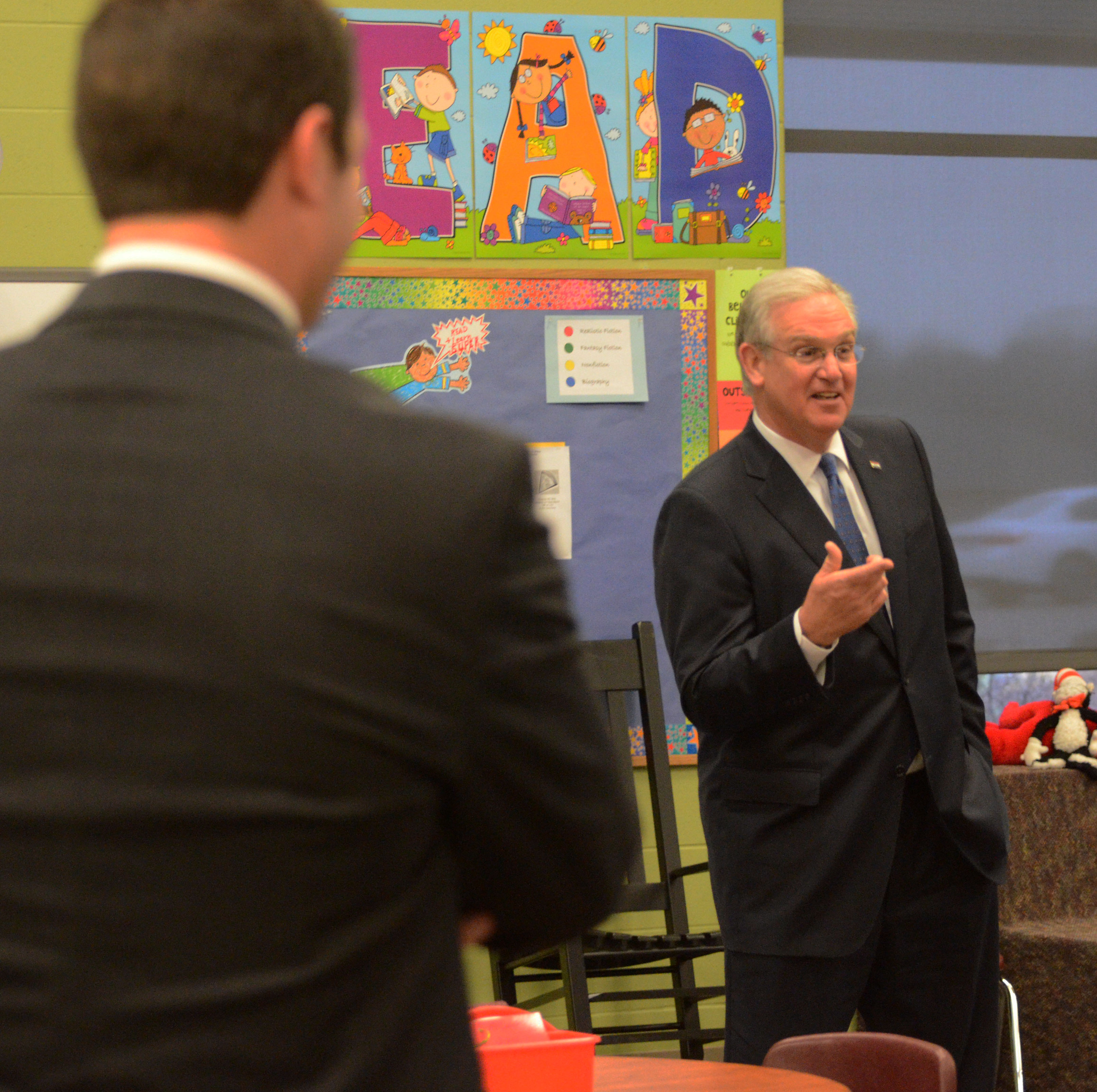
Nixon visiting an elementary school in 2014

On August 2, 2016, Michael Barrett, director of the Missouri State Public Defender System, called on Nixon to act as a public defender in a criminal assault case. Nixon's communications director, Scott Holste, questioned the authority of Barrett to do so. The appointment followed a July 2016 legal action in which Barrett et al. challenged the constitutionality of restricting funds for indigent defense.

In an open letter to Nixon, Barrett cited Missouri Revised Statues Section 600.042.5(1) as well as the 6th and 14th amendments to the United States Constitution as reasons for the controversial action. Barrett blamed Nixon for the underfunding and understaffing of the public defender system and chose to appoint him because he was "the one attorney in the state who not only created the problem, but is in a unique position to address it." According to Barrett, the funding for "resources that assist with delivering legal services" had increased between 5 and 6% since 2009, while costs over the same period had increased 18%. The case load had increased over 12% in the past year. According to a 2008 report by the National Legal Aid & Defender Association, Missouri ranks 49th in per capita legal aid spending. Ruth Petsch, Jackson County Missouri's chief public defender, cited the lack of funding for inadequate defense and 9 to 12 month delays in adjudication for indigent persons who often remain in jail and are unable to maintain active employment during that time.

From November 2015 to November 2016, Missouri added 57,100 jobs, more than all eight of its neighboring states.

== Post-gubernatorial career ==
Nixon left office on January 9, 2017, with the inauguration of his successor Eric Greitens. He was the first Missouri governor to complete two-full terms since John Ashcroft completed his second term in 1993. After leaving office, Jay Nixon State Park was opened in eastern Missouri. In mid-April 2019, Nixon served as a visiting Menschel Senior Leadership Fellow at the Harvard T.H. Chan School of Public Health.

Nixon represented televangelist Jim Bakker in his lawsuit filed by Missouri Attorney General Eric Schmitt for allegedly selling false cures for the 2019-20 strains of coronavirus.

Nixon was seen as a potential candidate for the U.S. Senate election in 2022, with support from national party leaders such as Chuck Schumer. Ultimately, Nixon declined to run.

In 2023, Nixon was recruited by the organization No Labels to secure ballot access in all 50 states.

== Personal life ==
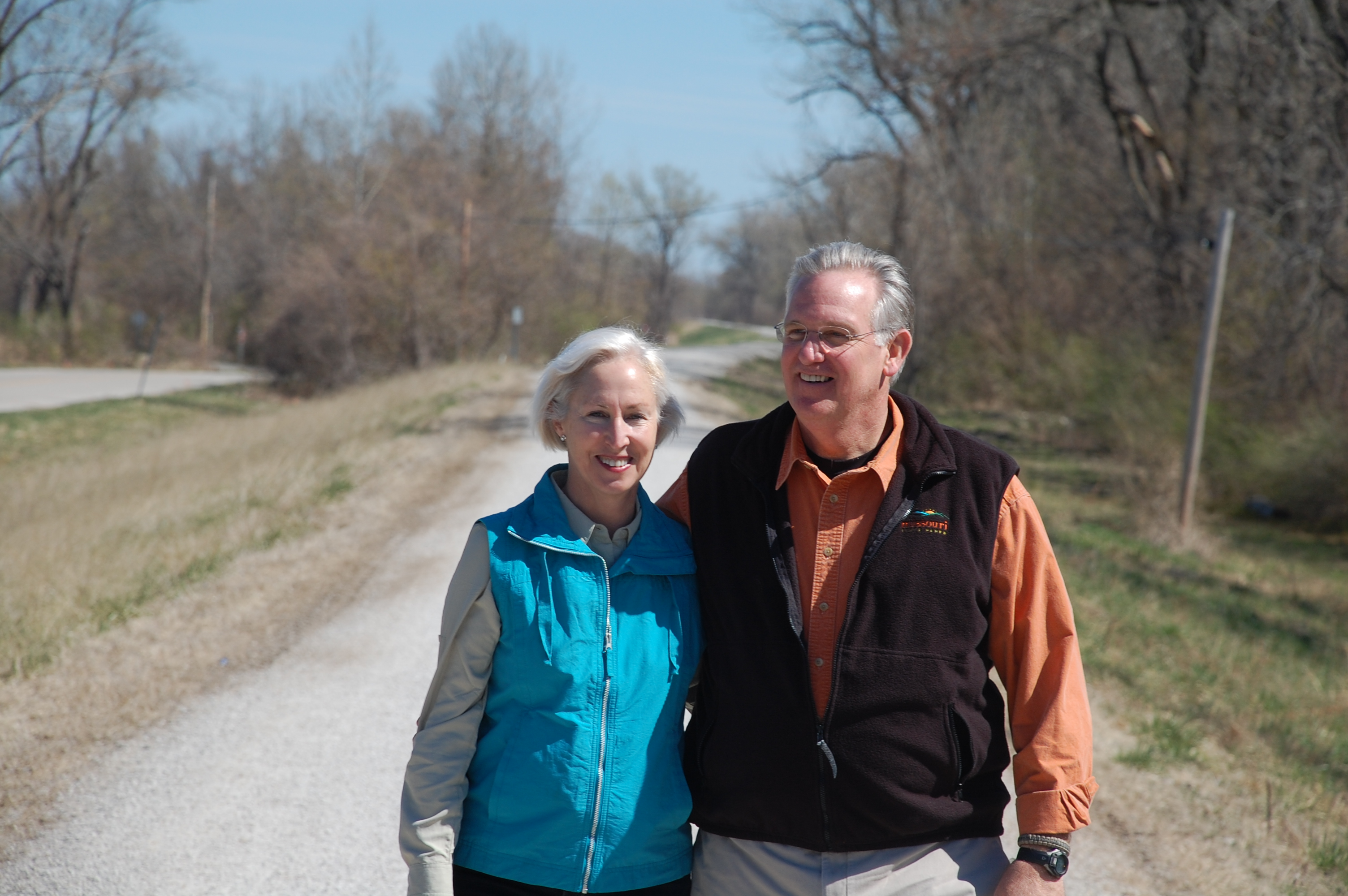
Georganne and Jay Nixon in 2011

After leaving office Nixon moved to University City, Missouri with his wife Georganne. The couple have two adult sons. Nixon is a Methodist.

== Electoral history ==
=== As Governor ===
Missouri gubernatorial election, 2012
Party	Candidate	Votes	%	±%
Democratic	Jay Nixon (incumbent)	1,485,147	54.68%	−3.71%
Republican	Dave Spence	1,157,475	42.62%	+3.12%
Libertarian	Jim Higgins	73,196	2.70%	+1.59%

Missouri Gubernatorial Democratic Primary Election, 2012
Party	Candidate	Votes	%	±
Democratic	Jay Nixon (incumbent)	270,140	85.99	
Democratic	William Campbell	25,775	8.20	
Democratic	Clay Thunderhawk	18,243	5.81	

Missouri Gubernatorial Election 2008
Party	Candidate	Votes	%	±%
Democratic	Jay Nixon	1,680,611	58.40	
Republican	Kenny Hulshof	1,136,364	39.49	
Libertarian	Andy Finkenstadt	31,850	1.11	−
Constitution	Greg Thompson	28,941	1.01	

Missouri Gubernatorial Democratic Primary Election 2008
Party	Candidate	Votes	%	±
Democratic	Jay Nixon	304,181	85.0	
Democratic	Daniel Carroll	53,835	15.0	

=== As Attorney General ===
Missouri Attorney General Election 2004
Party	Candidate	Votes	%	±%
Democratic	Jay Nixon (incumbent)	1,592,842	59.96	
Republican	Chris Byrd	1,000,503	37.66	
Libertarian	David R. Browning	43,538	1.64	−
Constitution	David Fry	19,802	0.75	

Missouri Attorney General Election 2000
Party	Candidate	Votes	%	±%
Democratic	Jay Nixon (incumbent)	1,378,296	60.25	
Republican	Sam Jones	855,814	37.41	
Libertarian	Mitch Moore	53,363	2.33	−

Missouri Attorney General Election 1996
Party	Candidate	Votes	%	±%
Democratic	Jay Nixon (incumbent)	1,243,091	59.42	
Republican	Mark Bredemeier	767,962	36.71	
Constitution	Kimberly Lowe	81,074	3.88	

Missouri Attorney General Election 1992
Party	Candidate	Votes	%	±%
Democratic	Jay Nixon	1,154,714	49.94	
Republican	David L. Steelman	1,064,814	46.05	
Libertarian	Mitchell J. Moore	92,576	4.00	−

=== U.S. Senate elections ===
Missouri U.S. Senate Election 1998
Party	Candidate	Votes	%	±%
Republican	Kit Bond	830,625	52.68	
Democratic	Jay Nixon	690,208	43.77	
Libertarian	Tamara A. Millay	31,876	2.02	−
Constitution	David Fry	15,368	0.97	
Reform	James F. Newport	8,780	0.56	

Missouri U.S. Senate Democratic Primary Election 1998
Party	Candidate	Votes	%	±
Democratic	Jay Nixon	200,339	66.5	
Democratic	James Askew	57,364	19.1	
Democratic	Daniel Dodson	19,257	6.4	
Democratic	Bob Buck	14,774	4.9	
Democratic	Andrew Ostrowski	9,389	3.1	

Missouri U.S. Senate Election 1988
Party	Candidate	Votes	%	±%
Republican	John Danforth	1,407,416	67.70	
Democratic	Jay Nixon	660,045	31.75	
Libertarian	John Guze	11,410	0.55	−

Party political offices
Preceded by Harriett Woods	Democratic nominee for U.S. Senator from Missouri (Class 1); 1988	Succeeded by Alan Wheat
Preceded by Michael A. Wolff	Democratic nominee for Attorney General of Missouri; 1992, 1996, 2000, 2004	Succeeded by Chris Koster
Preceded by Geri Rothman-Serot	Democratic nominee for U.S. Senator from Missouri (Class 3); 1998	Succeeded by Nancy Farmer
Preceded by Claire McCaskill	Democratic nominee for Governor of Missouri; 2008, 2012	Succeeded by Chris Koster
Legal offices
Preceded by William L. Webster	Attorney General of Missouri; 1993–2009	Succeeded by Chris Koster
Political offices
Preceded by Matt Blunt	Governor of Missouri; 2009–2017	Succeeded by Eric Greitens
U.S. order of precedence (ceremonial)
Preceded by Matt Blunt as Former Governor	Order of precedence of the United States	Succeeded by Eric Greitens as Former Governor
