= 1996 Missouri Attorney General election =

- November 5, 1996
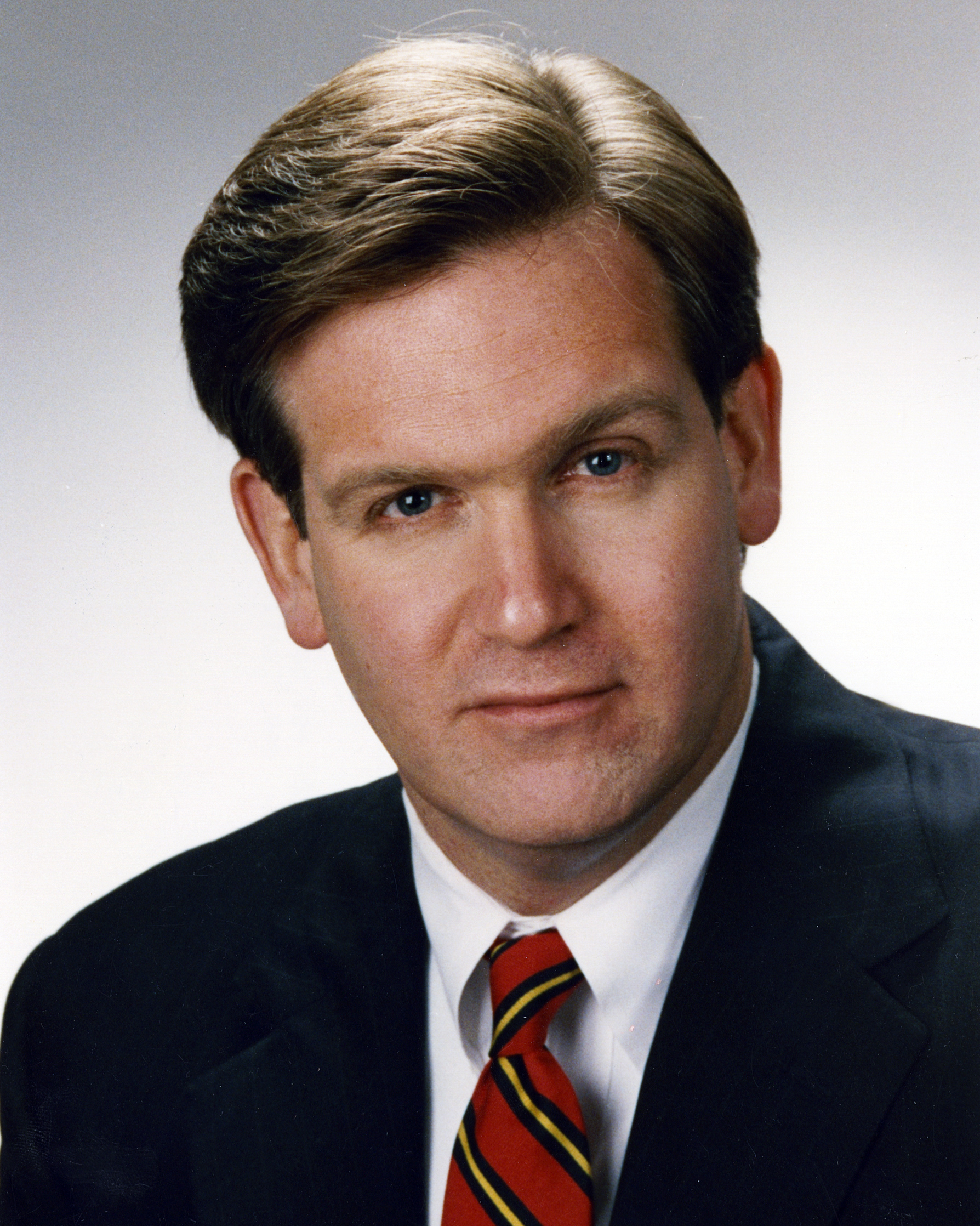

Nominee	Jay Nixon	Mark J. Bredemeier
Party	Democratic	Republican
Popular vote	1,243,091	767,962
Percentage	59.42%	36.71%
- County results Nixon: 40–50% 50–60% 60–70% 70–80% 80–90% Bredemeier: 40–50% 50–60%
Attorney General before election
Jay Nixon
Democratic
Elected Attorney General
Jay Nixon
Democratic

The 1996 Missouri Attorney General election was held on November 5, 1996, in order to elect the attorney general of Missouri. Democratic nominee and incumbent attorney general Jay Nixon defeated Republican nominee Mark J. Bredemeier and U.S. Taxpayers nominee Kimberly Lowe.

== General election ==
On election day, November 5, 1996, Democratic nominee Jay Nixon won re-election by a margin of 475,129 votes against his foremost opponent Republican nominee Mark J. Bredemeier, thereby retaining Democratic control over the office of attorney general. Nixon was sworn in for his second term on January 13, 1997.

=== Results ===
Missouri Attorney General election, 1996
Party	Candidate	Votes	%
Democratic	Jay Nixon (incumbent)	1,243,091	59.42
Republican	Mark J. Bredemeier	767,962	36.71
Constitution	Kimberly Lowe	81,074	3.87
Total votes		2,092,127	100.00
Democratic hold			

== See also ==
- 1996 Missouri gubernatorial election
