= Missouri State Public Defender =

U.S. State public defender office

Missouri State Public Defender (MSPD) provides legal representation to indigent individuals accused or convicted of crimes in Missouri at the levels of the state trial court, state appellate court, Missouri Supreme Court, and the United States Supreme Court.

== History ==
The constitutional requirement for the public defender system at all levels of government was established in 1963 with the Supreme Court ruling Gideon v. Wainwright. The Missouri State Public Defender System was later established in 1972. By 1973, there were 14 public defender offices in the state of Missouri. In 1976, the Public Defender Commission was created to appoint full-time public defenders to four-year terms and to oversee the system. Legal representation was provided for felony, juvenile, and misdemeanor cases when the offence charged could result in jail time. By 1977, the total number of public defender offices had increased to 18.

In 1982, a house bill amended the system with the creation of the Office of State Public Defender (OSPD) as an independent department of the judicial branch of state government. By 1987, 23 public defender offices existed and employed 233 people. The remainder of the state was served by contracts with private attorneys. At that time, the system provided representation in more than 41,000 cases annually.

=== Public Defender System funding crisis ===
In August 2016, Michael Barrett, then director of the Missouri State Public Defender System, invoked a provision of Missouri law allowing him to appoint any member of the state bar to represent an indigent defendant. He used that authority to assign the case to then-Governor Jay Nixon, in protest of Nixon’s decision to withhold $3.5 million in funding from the underfunded system. A Cole County judge ruled in December 2017 that Barrett lacked the authority to make the appointment, and Nixon never represented the defendant.

The appointment followed a July 2016 legal action in which Barrett et al. challenge the constitutionality of restricting funds for indigent defense. On December 26, 2017, Judge Victor Howard ruled that "because the public defender does not exercise judicial power, a withholding of expenditures to it by the governor (the executive) does not violate the separation of powers doctrine." In an open letter to Nixon, Barrett cites Missouri Revised Statues Section 600.042.5(1) as well as the 6th and 14th amendments to the United States Constitution as reason for the controversial action. Barrett blames Nixon for the underfunding and understaffing of the public defender system and chose to appoint him because he is "the one attorney in the state who not only created the problem, but is in a unique position to address it." According to Barrett, the funding for "resources that assist with delivering legal services" have increased between 5 and 6% since 2009, while costs over the same period have increased 18%. The case load has increased by over 12% in the past year. According to a 2008 report by the National Legal Aid & Defender Association, Missouri ranks 49th in per capita legal aid spending. Ruth Petsch, Jackson County Missouri’s chief public defender, cites the lack funding for inadequate defense and 9 to 12 month delays in adjudication for indigent persons who often remain in jail and are unable to maintain active employment during that time.
