= Missouri Sunshine Law =

The Missouri Sunshine Law is the common name for Chapter 610 of the Revised Statutes of Missouri, the primary law regarding freedom of the public to access information from any public or quasi-public governmental body in the U.S. state of Missouri.

== History ==
The Missouri legislature passed the statute in 1973 to ensure that the state government would be open and accountable, in the spirit of the 1967 Freedom of Information Act, which governs records requests to the federal government.

The statute has been changed several times, most recently in 2017.

The law gained attention during the 2020 COVID pandemic, when it was used to reveal personal information about people who reported alleged lockdown breaches.

== Summary ==
- All meetings, records, votes, and actions of governmental bodies shall be made openly available to the public unless there is specific law otherwise. When any governmental body votes the votes must be recorded, and where possible with attribution to which officials voted which way. All votes must be cast through physical presence of the official voting or by live call in (via voice or electronic means). Any change to the voting procedures of a body shall be noted in publicly available minutes.
- Public meetings must be announced at least one work day before they are to happen, a notice must include time of meeting, date of meeting, place of meeting, the agenda the meeting (if it is open, and if the meeting is open or closed to the public. Organizers of the meeting must provide legal ways for members of the public to record the meeting. Records must be kept of the happenings of each meeting.
- Closed meetings may be held in certain circumstances, such as meetings concerned about government purchases, the state militia, security software, one's Individually identifiable personal records especially if they are a minor. The state shall never reveal any person's Social Security number. If it may reasonably endanger a person or hinder an investigation, personal criminal and law enforcement records should be made open.
- No meeting may be closed without an affirmative public vote of the majority of a quorum of the public governmental body.
- Each governmental body must keep its records under the handling of a custodian. Copies of records may be made but records should never be removed or destroyed.
- Any emails regarding public business sent by a member of a public governmental body must also be sent to the custodian of records to be kept.
- Public governmental bodies must provide copies of public records to anyone who asks, no reason for accessing needs to be provided. If records are requested in a certain format, the custodian shall provide the records in the requested format, if such format is available. If the requested records are not given in three days then the custodian must provide a reason. A reasonable price may be charged for copying, the price for copying on sheets of paper shall not exceed 10 cents per sheet of paper. If possible, public governmental bodies should put their records on a free and easy to access website.
- Government bodies that choose not to comply can be brought to court. An individual who purposefully violates the law may receive a fine of up to $5,000. No employee of any governmental body may be fired for reporting what is believed to be a violation of the statute if they did so in good faith.

== Criticisms ==
=== Lack of enforcement ===
In a 2014 interview with St. Louis Public Radio, Jean Maneke, a consulting attorney for the Missouri Press Association, has expressed that the law's biggest shortcoming is a de facto lack of enforcement, saying "even though the law does have enforcement provisions in it, but it is a very difficult law to enforce". In the same article, Chris McDonald (the author), explains how in another investigation he had to wait 60 day to receive documents from a Sunshine requests (20 times the delivery goal set in the statute).

Requests to agencies of the state's government are even less likely to followed through on as the Missouri Attorney General's office is not likely to prosecute state agencies because they are their "clients". Complainants who have problems requesting from state agencies have been told to "contact a private attorney" instead of having the Attorney General pursue for them.

=== Cost to public ===
In a 2021 interview with The Joplin Globe, Jean Maneke, a consulting attorney for the Missouri Press Association called the cost of access "the No. 1 obstacle to the public" in accessing the files made public through the law, saying "when a requester cannot specifically identify what record is sought, it hinders fast location of that record, which drives up the 'search' portion of the cost".

There have been attempts to raise the cost of access for getting and searching for documents through sunshine requests.

== Further reading (external links) ==
- Chapter 610 in whole text on the official website of the Missouri Revisor of Statutes: https://revisor.mo.gov/main/ViewChapter.aspx?chapter=610
- An explanatory guide to the Sunshine law from the Missouri Attorney General's office, in PDF form: https://ago.mo.gov/docs/default-source/publications/missourisunshinelaw.pdf
