= Webster v. Reproductive Health Services =

- Supreme Court of the United States

Argued April 26, 1989 Decided July 3, 1989
- Full case name: William L. Webster, Attorney General of Missouri, et al. v. Reproductive Health Services, et al.
- Citations: 492 U.S. 490 (more) 109 S. Ct. 3040; 106 L. Ed. 2d 410; 1989 U.S. LEXIS 3290; 57 U.S.L.W. 5023

Case history
- Prior: Reproductive Health Servs. v. Webster, 662 F. Supp. 407 (W.D. Mo. 1987); affirmed, 851 F.2d 1071 (8th Cir. 1988); probable jurisdiction noted, 488 U.S. 1003 (1989).

Holding
- The Missouri law did not violate the Fourteenth Amendment.

Court membership
- Chief Justice William Rehnquist Associate Justices William J. Brennan Jr. · Byron White; Thurgood Marshall · Harry Blackmun; John P. Stevens · Sandra Day O'Connor; Antonin Scalia · Anthony Kennedy

Case opinions
- Majority: Rehnquist (part II-C), joined by unanimous; White, O'Connor, Scalia, Kennedy (parts I, II-A, II-B)
- Plurality: Rehnquist (parts II-D, III), joined by White, Kennedy
- Concurrence: O'Connor
- Concurrence: Scalia
- Concur/dissent: Blackmun, joined by Brennan, Marshall
- Concur/dissent: Stevens

Laws applied
- U.S. Const. amend. XIV

Webster v. Reproductive Health Services, 492 U.S. 490 (1989), was a United States Supreme Court decision on upholding a Missouri law that imposed restrictions on the use of state funds, facilities, and employees in performing, assisting with, or counseling an abortion. The Supreme Court in Webster allowed for states to legislate in an aspect that had previously been thought to be forbidden under Roe v. Wade (1973).

== Background ==
The state of Missouri passed a law that in its preamble stated that "the life of each human being begins at conception", and "unborn children have protectable interests in life, health, and well-being."

The statute

- required that all Missouri state laws be interpreted to provide unborn children with rights equal to those enjoyed by other persons, subject to limits imposed by the federal constitution, and federal court rulings;
- prohibited government-employed doctors from aborting a fetus they believed to be viable;
- prohibited the use of state employees or facilities to perform or assist abortions, except where the mother's life was in danger; and
- prohibited the use of public funds, employees, or facilities to "encourage or counsel" a woman to have an abortion, except where her life was in danger.

The United States District Court for the Western District of Missouri struck down the above provisions, and prohibited their enforcement. This decision was affirmed by the United States Court of Appeals for the Eighth Circuit, which ruled that these provisions violated Roe v. Wade and later Supreme Court decisions. William L. Webster, then Missouri Attorney General, appealed the decision to the Supreme Court. It was argued before the Court on April 26, 1989.

== Opinion of the Court ==
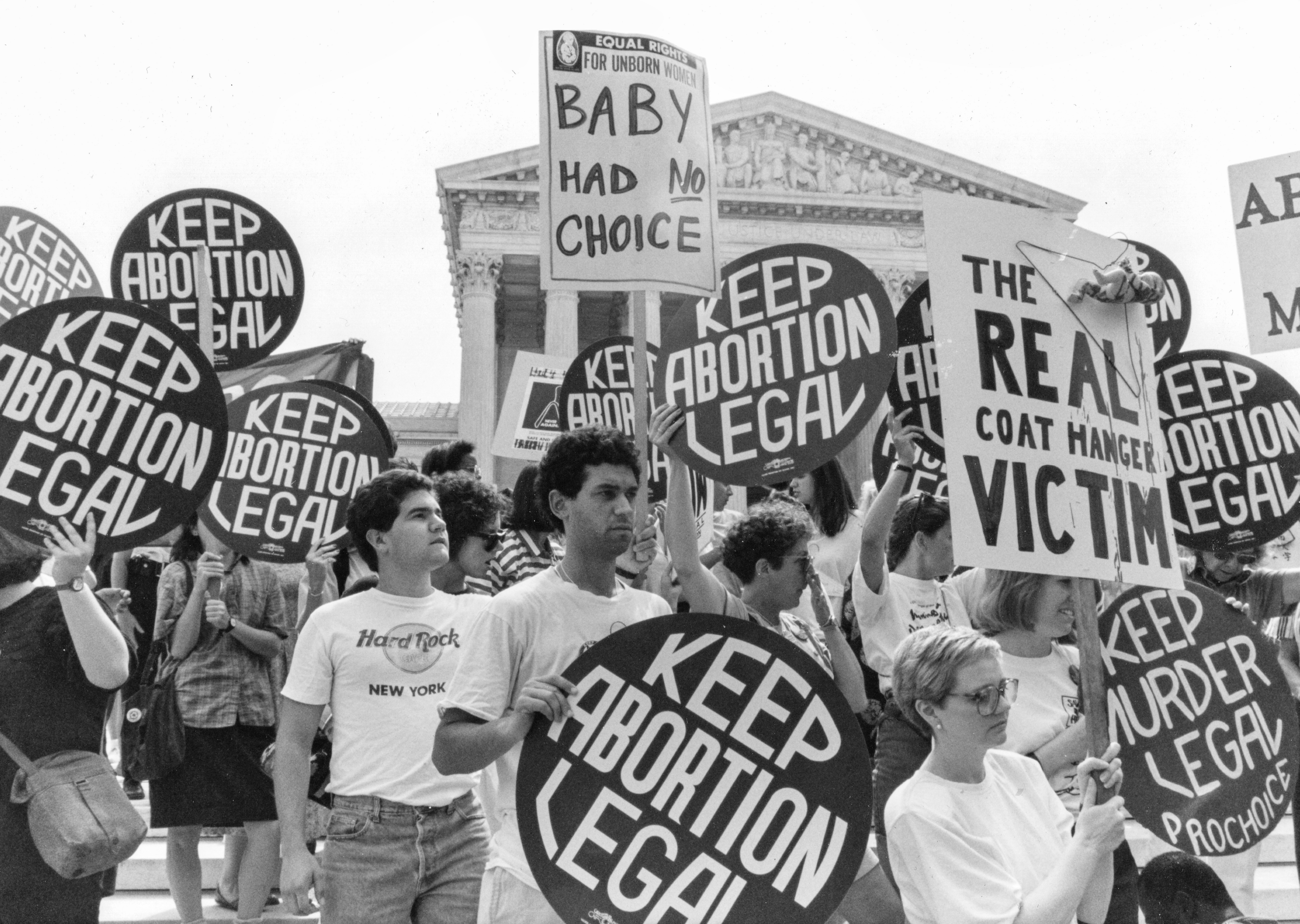
Pro-choice and anti-abortion advocates demonstrating outside the Supreme Court during Webster arguments

The Court overturned the decision of the lower courts, stating that:

1. The Court did not need to consider the constitutionality of the law's preamble, as it is not used to justify any abortion regulation otherwise invalid under Roe v. Wade.
2. The prohibitions on the use of public employees, facilities, and funds did not violate any of the Court's abortion decisions, as no affirmative right to the use of state aid for nontherapeutic abortions existed. The state could allocate resources in favor of childbirth over abortion if it so chose.
3. Provisions requiring testing for viability after 20 weeks of pregnancy were constitutional, but those limiting abortions in the second trimester of pregnancy were unconstitutional.

Chief Justice Rehnquist wrote the opinion of the Court for all but Parts II-D and III; however, only Justices White and Kennedy joined that opinion in its entirety. In discussing the fetal viability section, the plurality asserted that the right to abortion was a "liberty interest protected by the Due Process clause" subject to restriction by any laws which would permissibly further a rational state interest such as protecting potential life. The plurality said that this would require the court to "modify and narrow Roe and succeeding cases."

Part II-A was about statutory construction. The Missouri Act's preamble included a legislative finding, inter alia, that "[the] life of each human being begins at conception" and unborn children have "protectable interests in life". The Court of Appeals applied Akron's dictum that "a state may not adopt one theory of life when life begins to justify its regulation of abortions" to invalidate the preamble. Chief Justice Rehnquist's opinion declined to decide the constitutionality of the preamble, quoting from Alabama State Federation of Labor v. McAdory:

Lacking any authoritative construction of the statute by the state courts, without which no constitutional question arises, and lacking the authority to give such a controlling construction ourselves, and with a record which presents no concrete set of facts to which the statute is to be applied, the case is plainly not one to be disposed of by the declaratory judgment procedure.

Justices O'Connor and Scalia joined Rehnquist's opinion except for the section on viability testing. Each wrote a separate concurring opinion. Justice O'Connor said the preamble did not prohibit abortions and agreed with the Chief Justice that fears the preamble could bar access to post-fertilization contraceptives and IVF fertility treatment were "too hypothetical" to support declaratory judgment or injunctive remedies.

O'Connor said that narrowing Roe v. Wade in the context of the Webster litigation, where upholding Missouri's law could arguably be squared with Roe, would violate an important principle of judicial restraint. She then explained that she voted to uphold Missouri's law because she did not feel that it would place an undue burden on the right to abortion.

Justice Scalia, who was angered by the refusal of the plurality, as well as Justice O'Connor, to overturn Roe v. Wade, wrote a sharp opinion concurring in the judgment. In his concurrence he argued that the Court ought to have overturned Roe, rather than attempting to uphold both Roe and the laws at issue, and he attacked Justice O'Connor's justification for declining to overturn Roe. He also agreed with Blackmun's assertion that the approach of the plurality would make Roe a dead letter.

=== Dissent ===
Justice Blackmun wrote a dissenting opinion, joined by Justices William Brennan and Thurgood Marshall, which focused on the plurality's desired narrowing of Roe as described in the section on the viability testing requirement. He wrote that the plurality's approach would allow a state to put virtually any restriction on abortion so long as it was rationally related to promoting potential life, and that this in effect would overturn Roe. Noting that the plurality and Scalia together were only a single vote away from effectively overruling Roe, he wrote "I fear for the future" and "a chill wind blows."

Justice John Paul Stevens wrote a separate dissent, where he concurred with the plurality in allowing the state to prohibit public funds from being allocated for abortion counselling, but argued the court otherwise should have upheld the lower courts in striking down the remaining restrictions.
