= Michael Davis (Missouri politician) =

American politician

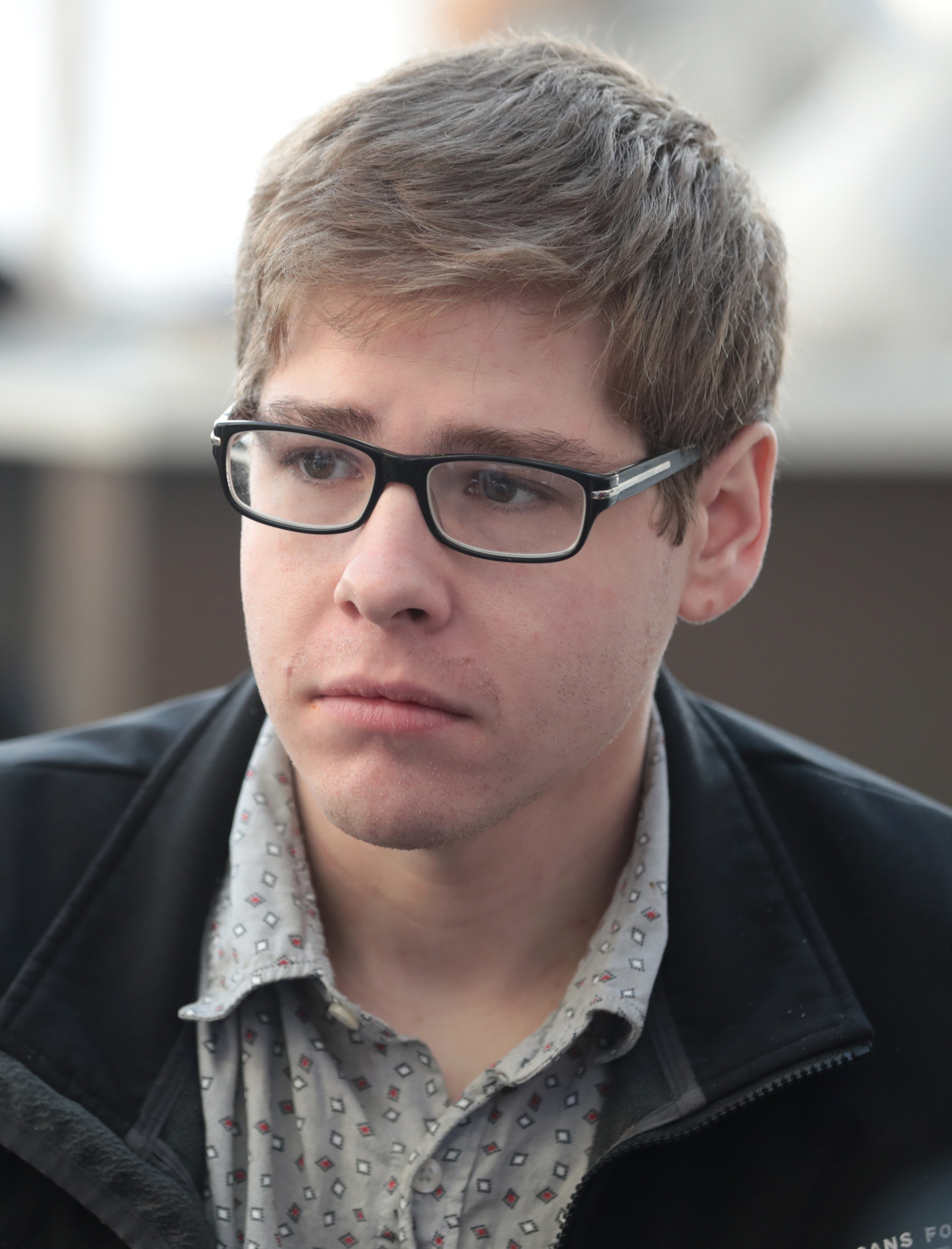
- Davis in 2022

Member of the Missouri House of Representatives from the 56th district
- Incumbent
- Assumed office January 6, 2021
- Preceded by: Jack Bondon
- Succeeded by: Staci Czar (elect)

Personal details
- Party: Republican
- Education: Harris–Stowe State University (BA); Washburn University (JD)

Michael Davis is an American politician serving as a member of the Missouri House of Representatives from the 56th district. Elected in November 2020, Davis assumed office on January 6, 2021. He will be succeeded by Democrat Staci Czar on January 6, 2027 after the Republican nominee for the district, Steve Baker, lost in an upset.

== Early life and education ==
Davis was raised in Maryland Heights, Missouri. He earned a Bachelor of Arts degree in education from Harris–Stowe State University in 2015 and a Juris Doctor from the Washburn University School of Law in 2018.

== Career ==
Davis began his career as an educator at an elementary school in the Blue Valley School District. Davis worked on campaigns for Jay Ashcroft, Adam Schnelting, and Bob Onder. He was also the engagement director with Americans for Prosperity. Davis was elected to the Missouri House of Representatives in November 2020 and assumed office on January 6, 2021.

As of July 2026, Davis serves on the following committees:

- Ways and Means, Vice-Chairman
- Corrections and Public Institutions
- Government Efficiency
- Judiciary
- Special Committee on Redistricting
- Special Committee on Urban Issues

=== Political issues ===
==== Abortion ====
Davis voted to defund Planned Parenthood.

==== Felony restrictions ====
In 2022, Davis introduced a bill in the Missouri State House to repeal restrictions put in place in 2015 which ban candidates with felony convictions from running for state or local offices. Davis then pre-filed a similar bill for the 2025 session titled the "Donald J. Trump Election Qualification Act," referencing felony convictions held by the incoming US President. Neither Davis's 2023 bill (HB 692) nor his 2025 bill (HB 318) received a committee hearing.

==== Marriage ====
In 2022, Davis criticized Roy Blunt's vote in support of the Respect for Marriage Act. He has stated support for changing the Missouri constitution to recognize domestic union between two individuals, saying that marriage should not be a matter for the state government to decide.

== Electoral history ==
Missouri House of Representatives Primary Election, August 4, 2020, District 56
Party	Candidate	Votes	%	±%
Republican	Michael Davis	2,270	47.88%	
Republican	Chip Anderson	1,394	29.40%	
Republican	John Webb	1,077	22.72%	
Total votes		4,741	100.00	

Missouri House of Representatives Election, November 3, 2020, District 56
Party	Candidate	Votes	%	±%
Republican	Michael Davis	11,228	62.49%	−37.51
Democratic	Neil Barnes	6,741	37.51%	+37.51
Total votes		17,969	100.00%	

Missouri House of Representatives Election, November 8, 2022, District 56
Party	Candidate	Votes	%	±%
Republican	Michael Davis	6,774	57.27%	−5.22
Democratic	Patty Johnson	5,049	42.73%	+5.22
Total votes		11,828	100.00%	
