= Jack Bondon =

American politician

Member of the Missouri House of Representatives from the 56th district
- In office January 7, 2015 – January 4, 2021
- Preceded by: Chris Molendorp
- Succeeded by: Michael Davis

Personal details
- Born: August 6, 1981 (age 44) Kansas City, Missouri, U.S.
- Party: Republican
- Education: Georgetown University (BS)

Jack Bondon (born August 6, 1981) is an American politician who served as a member of the Missouri House of Representatives for the 56th district from 2015 to 2021.

== Early life and education ==
Born in Kansas City, Missouri, Bondon attended Rockhurst High School. He is a 2004 graduate of Georgetown University.

== Career ==
During his tenure in the House, Bondon served as chief deputy whip of the Republican caucus and as chairman of the House Financial Institutions Committee. He also served as a member of the Emerging Issues in Education Committee, the Energy and the Environment Committee, the Utilities Committee, the Emerging Issues–General Laws Committee, the Banking Committee, the Rules- House Consent and Procedure Committee, and the Rules Committee.
