= David Steelman =

American politician

David Steelman is an American politician from the state of Missouri. He served in the Missouri House of Representatives, including his time as minority speaker, and the University of Missouri Board of Curators.

== Career ==
David Steelman

Member of the Missouri House of Representatives
- In office 1979–1985

Personal details
- Party: Republican
- Spouse: Sarah Steelman
- Education: University of Missouri, Columbia (BA, JD)

David Steelman earned a B.A. in economics from the University of Missouri, and graduated first in his class from the University of Missouri Law School in 1978. He is the son of the late Dorman L. Steelman, who served in the Missouri House of Representatives, as a circuit judge, and as chairman of the Missouri Republican Party.

Steelman, a Republican, was elected to his first term in the Missouri House of Representatives in 1978 at the age of 25 (under the state constitution, the minimum age for a state representative is 24). He was re-elected in 1980 and 1982, and was selected as minority floor leader. Steelman did not seek re-election in 1984, returning to the practice of law in his native Rolla, Missouri.

Steelman worked as an Assistant Attorney General under former House colleague William L. Webster until Webster vacated the Attorney General's office to run unsuccessfully for governor in 1992, and Steelman ran to succeed him. In the Republican primary, Steelman faced Assistant United States Attorney John Hall, a moderate Republican who previously had worked for former U.S. Senator John C. Danforth and for then-Governor Kit Bond. Danforth campaigned for Hall, while Steelman attacked Hall's relative liberalism and his Harvard pedigree. Steelman won the Republican primary but lost the general election to Jay Nixon, 51% to 45%.

In 2014, then-Governor Nixon appointed Steelman to the University of Missouri Board of Curators. In 2021, governor Mike Parson demanded his resignation following concerns Steelman raised on conflict of interest activities by lobbyist Steven Tilley.

As an attorney, Steelman has represented Tritium International Consulting in a case of unregulated gaming machines, and house speaker Dean Plocher in an ethics investigation.

== Electoral history ==
Missouri Attorney General Election 1992
Party	Candidate	Votes	%	±%
Democratic	Jay Nixon	1,154,714	49.94	
Republican	David L. Steelman	1,064,814	46.05	
Libertarian	Mitchell J. Moore	92,576	4.00	−

== Personal ==
Steelman has not sought elective office since 1992, instead focusing on his law practice. His wife, Sarah Steelman served in the Missouri State Senate from 1999 to 2005, as state treasurer from 2005 to 2009, and was a candidate for Governor of Missouri in 2008, until she lost the Republican primary. In 2012 she lost a bid for the US Senate in the Republican primary against Representative Todd Akin.

== Sources ==
- Steelman biodata

Party political offices
Preceded by William L. Webster	Republican nominee for Missouri Attorney General; 1992	Succeeded by Mark J. Bredemeier
