= Staci Czar =

American politician

Member-elect of the Missouri House of Representatives from the 56th district
- Assuming office January 6, 2027
- Succeeding: Michael Davis

Personal details
- Party: Democratic
- Website: Campaign website

Staci Czar is an American politician of the Missouri Democratic Party who is the representative-elect for the 56th district in the Missouri House of Representatives. She was elected in the 2026 general election. She attended Belton High School. She served on the Belton Park Board.
