= William L. Webster =

American lawyer, Missouri politician and felon (b. 1953)

William Webster
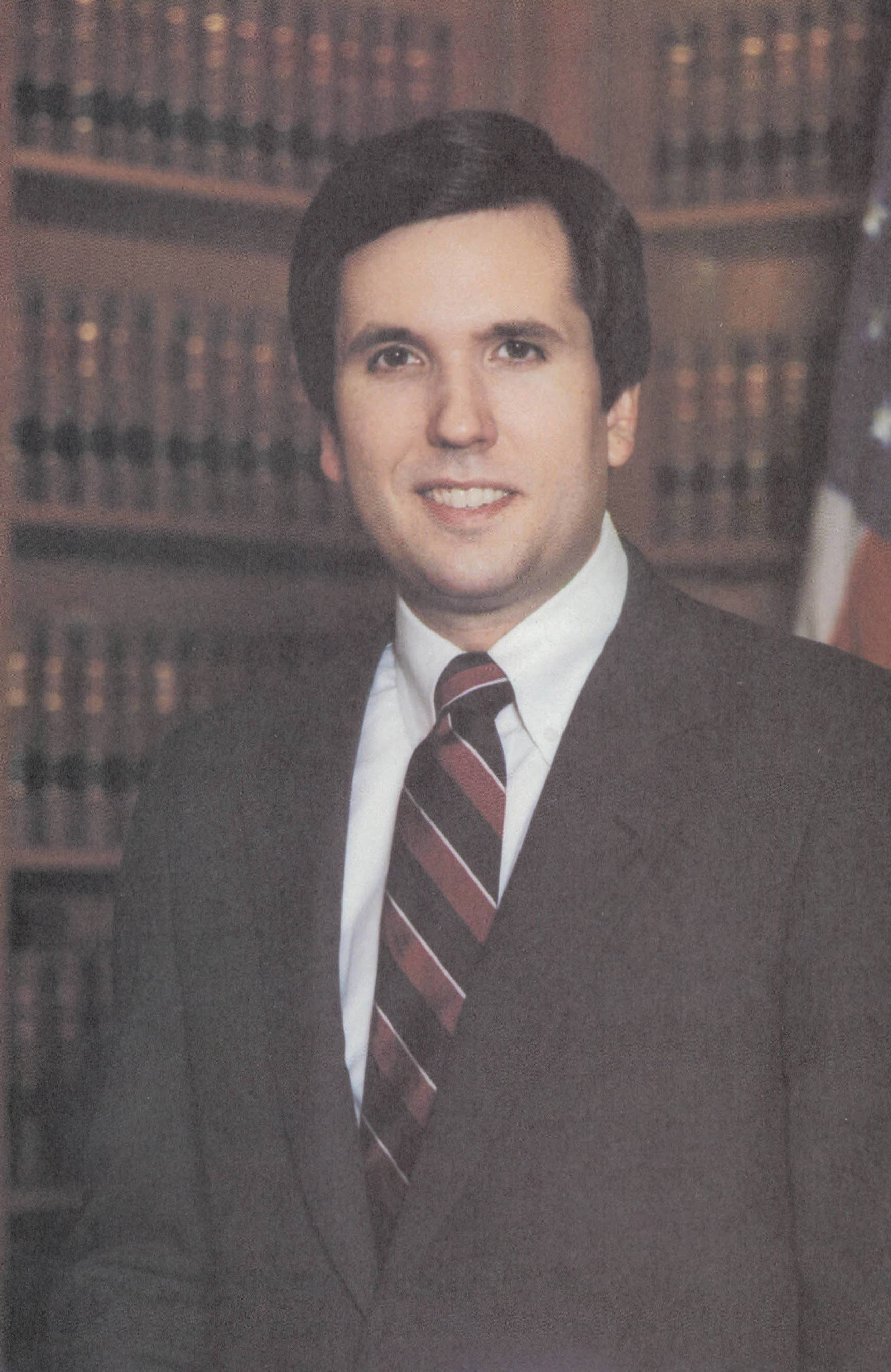

39th Attorney General of Missouri
- In office January 14, 1985 – January 11, 1993
- Governor: John Ashcroft
- Preceded by: John Ashcroft
- Succeeded by: Jay Nixon

Member of the Missouri House of Representatives from the 128th district
- In office January 1983 – January 1985
- Preceded by: William Black
- Succeeded by: Chuck Surface

Member of the Missouri House of Representatives from the 137th district
- In office January 1981 – January 1983
- Preceded by: Thomas Carver
- Succeeded by: Fred Lynn

Personal details
- Born: William Lawrence Webster; September 17, 1953 (age 73) Carthage, Missouri, U.S.
- Party: Republican
- Spouse: Susan Webster
- Education: University of Kansas; Missouri Southern State University (BA); University of Missouri, Kansas City (JD)

William Lawrence Webster (born September 17, 1953) is an American lawyer and former politician from Missouri. He served in the Missouri House of Representatives and later as the 39th Attorney General of Missouri from 1985 to 1993. After failing to win election as governor in 1992, Webster pleaded guilty to felony embezzlement. He served two years at the Federal Correctional Complex at Florence, Colorado, prisoner number 27095.

== Early life and career ==
William Lawrence Webster is the son of the late Richard M. Webster, who was a prominent Missouri State Senator, and Janet Webster. Webster was born and raised in Carthage, Missouri and was a graduate of Carthage Senior High School. He attended Missouri Southern State College and the University of Kansas. He received his J.D. degree from the University of Missouri–Kansas City.

After law school, Webster worked as an attorney in private practice in Joplin, Missouri. He married the former Susan Tieman of Kansas City and they have three sons.

== Political career ==
Webster was elected to Missouri House of Representatives in 1980 and re-elected in 1982. He was recognized as the outstanding first term representative by the Missouri Times in 1981 and in 1983 his colleagues recognized him as one of three outstanding members of the House of Representatives.

In 1984, at the age of 31, he was elected as Attorney General of Missouri, succeeding John Ashcroft. Webster was the youngest person to serve in that position since Robert Franklin Walker was elected as attorney general in 1892, also at the age of 31. Webster was re-elected in 1988.

Webster was the defendant of record in the Webster v. Reproductive Health Services case before the United States Supreme Court in 1989. The court ultimately decided in favor of Webster, representing the State of Missouri.

In 1992, Webster was the Republican nominee for Governor of Missouri, after defeating Roy Blunt and Wendell Bailey in the Republican Primary. The campaign for governor was marked by allegations of corruption relating to a state workers compensation fund that Webster managed as attorney general. Amidst the scandal, Webster lost the general election to Democrat Mel Carnahan by a wide margin.

== Scandal ==
In 1993, Webster pleaded guilty to felony embezzlement charges and was sentenced to two years in prison. Webster's re-election campaign had received unusually large contributions from firms making claims against a little-known $30 million workers' compensation fund, which Webster had defended by appointing private lawyers as special assistant state attorneys general. Lawyers who contributed to Webster obtained substantially larger settlements for their clients than those lawyers who did not contribute. Ultimately, Webster pleaded guilty to two federal felony charges of conspiracy and embezzlement related to abusing his position as Attorney General by using his state staff and office equipment for political purposes.

Missouri House of Representatives
Preceded by Thomas D. Carver	Member of the Missouri House of Representatives from the 137th district 1981–1983	Succeeded by Fred Lynn
Preceded by William L. Black	Member of the Missouri House of Representatives from the 128th district 1983–1985	Succeeded by Chuck Surface
Legal offices
Preceded by John Ashcroft	Attorney General of Missouri; 1985–1993	Succeeded by Jay Nixon
Party political offices
Preceded by John Ashcroft	Republican nominee for Missouri Attorney General; 1984, 1988	Succeeded by David Steelman
Preceded by John Ashcroft	Republican nominee for Governor of Missouri; 1992	Succeeded by Margaret Kelly
