= Chris Molendorp =

American politician

Member of the Missouri House of Representatives from the 56th district
- In office January 9, 2013 – January 7, 2015
- Preceded by: Mike Cierpiot
- Succeeded by: Jack Bondon

Member of the Missouri House of Representatives from the 123rd district
- In office January 7, 2009 – January 9, 2013
- Preceded by: Brian Baker
- Succeeded by: Diane Franklin

Personal details
- Born: July 5, 1969 (age 57) St. Louis, Missouri
- Party: Republican

Chris Molendorp (born July 5, 1969) is an American politician who served in the Missouri House of Representatives from 2009 to 2015.
