= Missouri Information Analysis Center =

The Missouri Information Analysis Center, or MIAC is a "fusion center," combining resources from the federal Department of Homeland Security and other agencies, in particular local agencies. It collects intelligence from both the local agencies and the Department of Homeland Security and uses these combined sources to analyze threats and better combat terrorism and other criminal activity. The center opened in 2005 and is located in Jefferson City, Missouri.
