= Missouri Attorney General =

Attorney general for the U.S. state of Missouri

Attorney General of Missouri
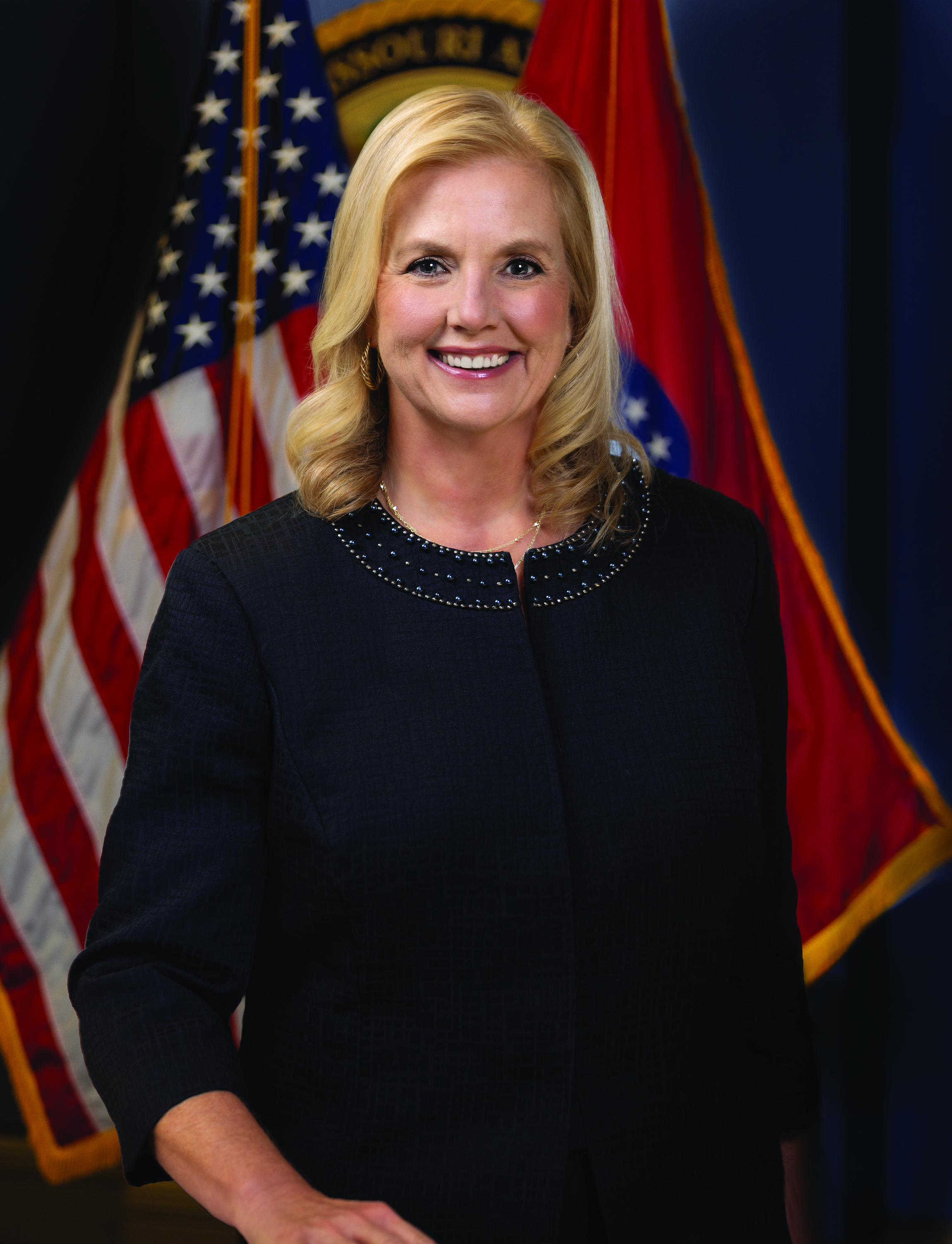
- Incumbent; Catherine Hanaway since September 8, 2025
- Type: Attorney General
- Member of: Board of Fund Commissioners
- Seat: Supreme Court building
- Formation: 1806
- First holder: Edward Bates
- Succession: Seventh
- Website: Missouri Attorney General official website

The Office of the Missouri Attorney General was created in 1806 when Missouri was part of the Louisiana Territory. Missouri's first Constitution in 1820 provided for an appointed attorney general, but since the 1865 Constitution, the Attorney General has been elected. As of September 2025 there have been 45 attorneys general in Missouri.

By law, the attorney general is a member of the Board of Fund Commissioners, the Board of Public Buildings, the Governor's Committee on Interstate Cooperation, the Missouri Highway Reciprocity Commission and the Missouri Housing Development Commission.

Offices of the Attorney General are located throughout the state of Missouri with the main office being in the Supreme Court building in Jefferson City.

== Attorney for the State ==
The Missouri Attorney General is the attorney for the state, representing the legal interests of Missouri and its state agencies.

As the state's chief legal officer, the attorney general must prosecute or defend all appeals to which the state is a party, including every felony criminal case appealed to the Supreme Court of Missouri and Missouri Court of Appeals. The attorney general also is required to institute, in the name and on behalf of the state, all civil suits and other proceedings that are necessary to protect the state's rights, interests, or claims. The attorney general may appear, interplead, answer or defend any proceedings that involve the state's interests, or appear on behalf of the state in declaratory judgment proceedings when the constitutionality of a statute is challenged.

The attorney general also renders official opinions to the executive and legislative branch and the county prosecuting attorneys on questions of law relating to their duties. The attorney general may institute quo warranto proceedings against anyone unlawfully holding office or move to oust any public official for malfeasance in office.

To fulfill these and other responsibilities, the attorney general's office is organized into eight divisions.

== Divisions of the Attorney General ==
=== Agriculture and Environment Division ===
The mission of the Agriculture and Environment Division is to "protect Missouri's natural resources and agricultural productivity."

Attorneys shall take legal action to stop pollution of the state's air, water and soil and penalize polluters through fines, penalties and, in the most serious cases, incarceration.

The attorney general has taken action in recent years to protect the state's interests in management of the Missouri River. Legal battles over the Missouri River often pit Missouri against states that are upstream (specifically North Dakota and South Dakota) and the U.S. Army Corps of Engineers.

Beginning in 2006, the attorney general became involved in the controversial Taum Sauk reservoir disaster when, as special prosecutor, he filed a lawsuit against the state's largest utility company asking it be ordered to pay compensation and punitive damages after the release of more than a billion gallons of water from the ruptured mountain-top reservoir caused extensive damage to the nearby east fork of the Black River and Johnson Shut-ins State Park

Other legal battles have included the waterways of the White River basin and Missouri's Church Mountain.

=== Consumer Protection Division ===
The attorney general has the responsibility of protecting the public's interests in an open and honest marketplace. The Consumer Protection Division enforces Missouri's Consumer Protection Act and antitrust laws, and has the responsibility of representing the commissioner of securities of the secretary of state's office. Missouri's consumer protection statutes prohibit deception, fraud, unfair practices and misrepresentation or concealment of material facts in the sale or advertisement of goods or services. These laws authorize the attorney general to take action against such fraud and ensure that consumers' rights are protected.

Consumers may file complaints against businesses and individuals with the attorney general. More than 90,000 consumer complaints and inquiries each year are submitted to the attorney general. Many of those complaints are resolved through mediation by the AG. In cases where a company's actions have been determined to be in violation of Missouri's consumer protection law, complaints lead to legal action. Some complaints are frivolous. Missouri residents may file complaints against any business entity and non-Missouri residents may file complaints against Missouri businesses. Complaints are available for searching by the public.

Under the Missouri Antitrust Law, the attorney general has the authority to represent the state or any of its political subdivisions, public agencies, school districts or municipalities in actions to prohibit monopolies and trade restraints. The attorney general also may act under federal antitrust statutes to bring civil actions in the name of the state and on behalf of Missouri residents to recover damages for injuries caused by certain antitrust violations.

The attorney general is the state's chief prosecutor for securities fraud, and may initiate legal actions for civil injunctive relief, penalties and restitution under the Missouri Merchandising Practices Law. Attorneys in this division also protect Missourians by enforcing compliance with state laws by trusts, foundations and nonprofit corporations.

The attorney general also administers Missouri's No Call program. The No Call program was designed to reduce unwanted telemarketing calls and has become a model for other states. Persons may register Missouri residential phone lines, lookup whether a phone number has been registered and file a complaint against a telemarketer.

The division also has an active consumer education program. The Attorney General's Office has many publications for consumers on topics ranging from adoption to landlord-tenant law and also offers a general guide to consumer entitled, "Know Your Rights". All publications may be ordered and the cost is free.

The Missouri Attorney General was the first attorney general in the United States to blog. That blog is a consumer education blog published by members of the Consumer Protection division and is part of a larger consumer education effort that includes a consumer encyclopedia, online calculators, quizzes and worksheets.

=== Criminal Division ===
The attorney general represents the state in every felony case appealed to the Supreme Court of Missouri and Missouri Court of Appeals. Each year, attorneys in the Criminal Division brief and argue more than 700 cases in the Missouri Court of Appeals and the Supreme Court of Missouri. Division attorneys also assist with extraditions to and from Missouri of those charged in criminal cases.

=== Financial Services Division ===
The Financial Services Division protects Missourians by recouping money owed to the state or state agencies, including providing collection services to several divisions of the attorney general's office and more than 40 other state agencies. Division attorneys also take legal action to establish and maintain child support obligations, and work to recover money owed by inmates to reimburse the state for the cost of their care.

=== Governmental Affairs Division ===
The Governmental Affairs Division "protects the safety and well-being of Missourians by ensuring that regulated professionals adhere to state laws and disciplinary rules, by enforcing state ethics and campaign finance laws, and by removing caregivers who abuse or neglect vulnerable citizens". It also charged with helping mentally ill and physically challenged Missourians obtain guardians to help get care. Division attorneys also help Missourians seek redress for claims of discrimination based on race, color, religion, national origin, ancestry, gender, disability, age and familial status.

The division provides legal representation to several state agencies, including the departments of Health and Senior Services, Revenue and Social Services; the Missouri Ethics Commission; and more than 30 professional licensing boards, including the Board of Registration for the Healing Arts, which regulates the practice of medicine.

Division attorneys enforce the provisions of the tobacco Master Settlement Agreement, which has brought in more than $1.2 billion to the state as of 2007. Attorneys in the division also address questions from the public, from government officials and from the media about Missouri's open meetings and records law, commonly known as the Sunshine Law.

=== Labor Division ===
The Labor Division provides general counsel and litigation services for the Missouri Department of Labor and Industrial Relations and its officers and agencies. The division also represents the state in prevailing wage disputes, crime victims' claims and workers' compensation cases of state employees, including claims involving the Second Injury Fund.

=== Litigation Division ===
Litigation Division attorneys handle major and complex litigation for Missouri, providing legal defense to state agencies and their employees. Cases in the division include damage claims, contract actions, class‑action lawsuits, employment issues, constitutional challenges and other types of civil litigation. The division also defends the state in lawsuits brought by inmates of Missouri's correctional facilities. Division attorneys also defend constitutional challenges to state laws and ballot issues.

=== Public Safety Division ===
The Public Safety Division is involved in a wide range of criminal prosecutions at the trial level. The division's special prosecution unit prosecutes or assists in the prosecution of cases throughout Missouri, many of them homicide cases. In 2006, division attorneys handled 794 special prosecutions in 94 of the state's 114 counties. The meth prosecution unit specializes in handling criminal cases involving the manufacture, sale or possession of methamphetamine.

The workers' compensation fraud unit prosecutes fraud or misconduct involving workers' compensation, and the Medicaid fraud control unit prosecutes cases involving fraud of the state Medicaid program by health professionals, or abuse or neglect of Medicaid recipients by caregivers.

The division's high technology and computer crime unit assists local law enforcement with investigations and prosecutions of computer and Internet crime cases.

The sexually violent predator unit seeks the civil commitment of sexual predators who suffer from a mental abnormality making them more likely than not to commit additional predatory acts of sexual violence.

Attorneys in the division also serve as legal counsel for the Department of Public Safety, the Missouri State Highway Patrol, the Missouri State Water Patrol and other state law enforcement agencies, and represent those agencies in all civil litigation in which they are a party.

Division attorneys also defend the state in all habeas corpus actions filed by prison inmates in state and federal courts. Each year they litigate some 500 federal habeas corpus actions in the federal district courts, the Eighth Circuit Court of Appeals, and the U.S. Supreme Court.

== See also ==
- Attorney general
- List of attorneys general of Missouri

== Notable attorneys general from Missouri ==
- Eric Schmitt (2019–2023) – United States Senator
- Josh Hawley (2017–2019) – United States Senator
- Jay Nixon (1993–2009) – longest serving at 16 years, Governor of Missouri
- John Ashcroft (1977–1985) – Attorney General of the United States under George W. Bush, United States Senator, Governor of Missouri
- John Danforth (1969–1977) – United States Ambassador to the United Nations, United States Senator
- Thomas Eagleton (1961–1965) – Democratic vice presidential nominee, United States Senator
- John M. Dalton (1953–1961) – Governor of Missouri
- Herbert S. Hadley (1905–1909) – Governor of Missouri and chancellor of Washington University in St. Louis
- Thomas T. Crittenden (1864) – Governor of Missouri who authorized a reward for the capture of Jesse James
- J. Proctor Knott (1858–1861) – Governor of Kentucky
- Edward Bates (1820–1821) – Attorney General of the United States under Abraham Lincoln
