= David Furness =

U.S. Marine Corps general

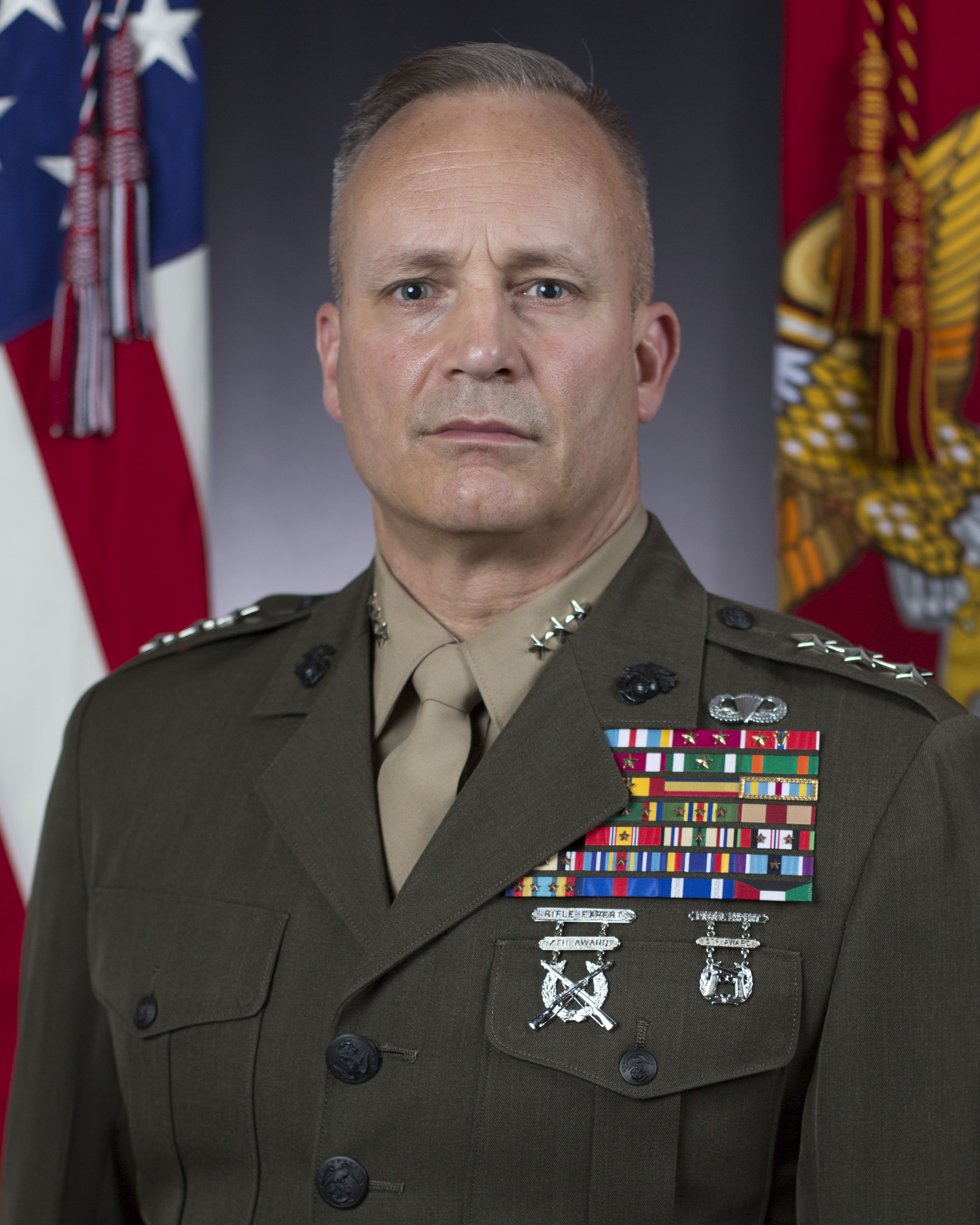
- Official portrait, 2021
- Military career
- Allegiance: United States
- Branch: United States Marine Corps
- Service years: 1987–2023
- Rank: Lieutenant General
- Commands: 2nd Marine Division; Combined Joint Task Force – Horn of Africa; Recruiting Station Sacramento; 1st Marine Regiment; 1st Battalion, 1st Marines
- Conflicts: Gulf War; War in Afghanistan; Iraq War
- Awards: Defense Superior Service Medal; Legion of Merit (3); Bronze Star Medal (2)
- Other work: Superintendent, Virginia Military Institute

David J. Furness is a retired United States Marine Corps lieutenant general who last served as the Deputy Commandant for Plans, Policies, and Operations from August 2021 to July 2023. He previously was the Assistant Deputy Commandant for Plans, Policies and Operations from August 2020 to August 2021. Furness retired from the U.S. Marines in 2023.

In August 2025 he was appointed by the Virginia Military Institute's Board of Visitors as the school's 16th Superintendent.

Military offices
Preceded by Kurt L. Sonntag	Commanding General of the Combined Joint Task Force – Horn of Africa; 2017–2018	Succeeded by William L. Zana
Preceded by John K. Love	Commanding General of the 2nd Marine Division; 2018–2020	Succeeded by Francis L. Donovan
Preceded by Gregg P. Olson	Assistant Deputy Commandant for Plans, Policies and Operations of the United States Marine Corps; 2020–2021	Succeeded by Robert F. Castellvi
Preceded by George W. Smith Jr.	Deputy Commandant for Plans, Policies, and Operations of the United States Marine Corps; 2021–2023	Succeeded by Roger B. Turner; Acting
