= Ghormley =

Ghormley is a surname. Notable people with the surname include:

- N. Rex Ghormley (1941–2009), American optometrist
- Robert L. Ghormley (1883–1958), US Navy Admiral
- Timothy F. Ghormley, US Marine Corps Major General

== See also ==
- Gormley
