= 2020 Missouri gubernatorial election =

- November 3, 2020
- Turnout: 69.75% ▲
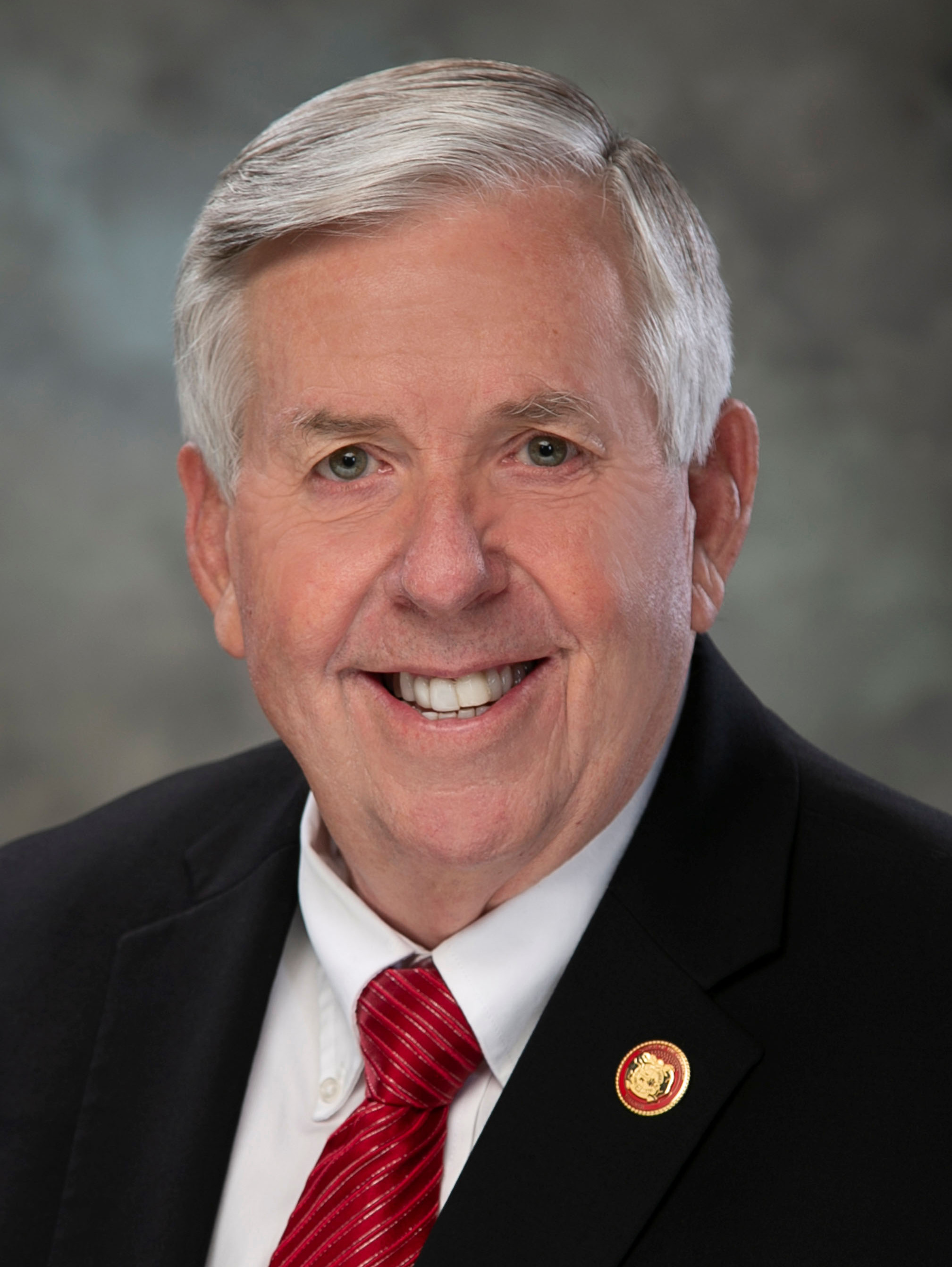

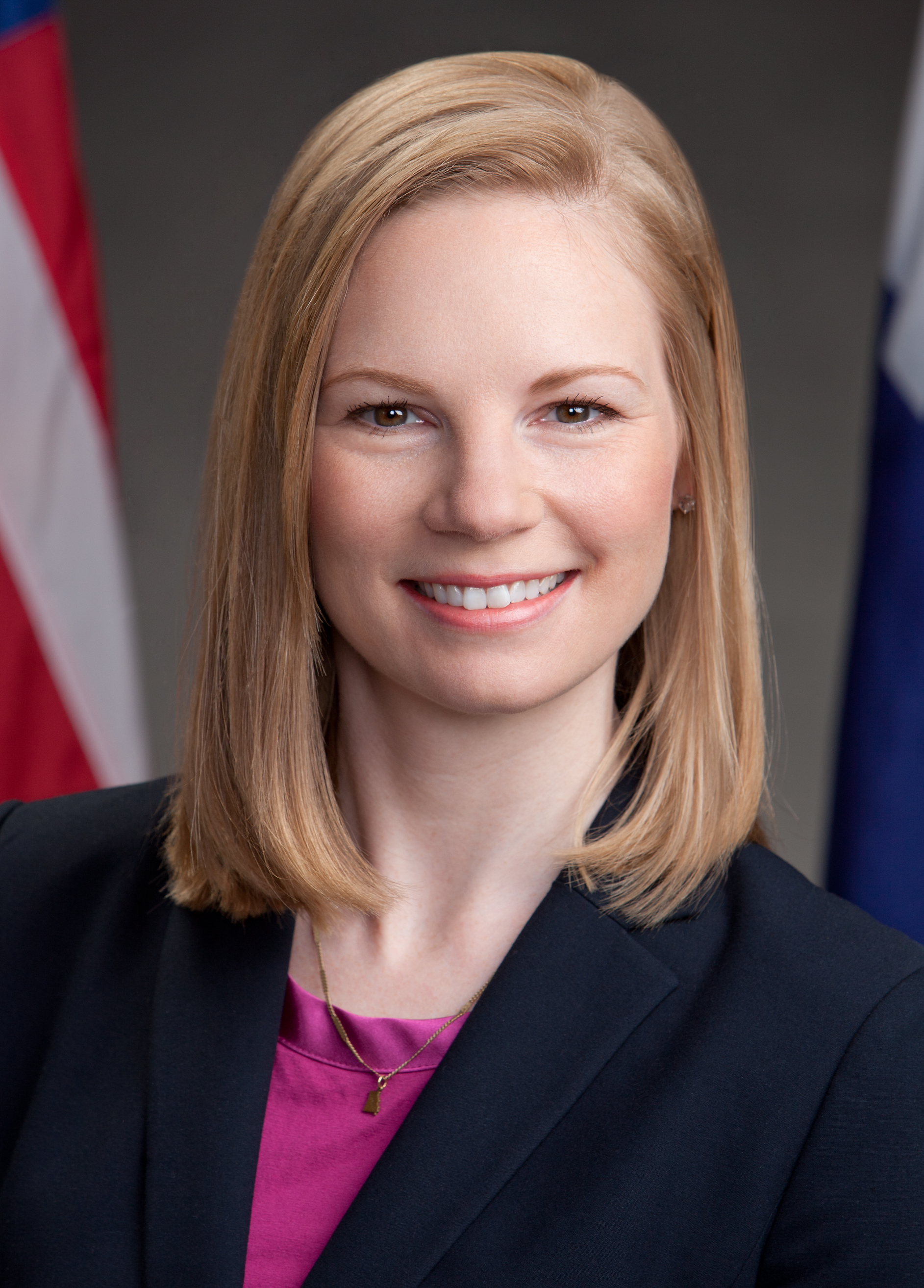
| Nominee | Mike Parson | Nicole Galloway |
| Party | Republican | Democratic |
| Popular vote | 1,720,202 | 1,225,771 |
| Percentage | 57.11% | 40.69% |
- Parson: 40–50% 50–60% 60–70% 70–80% 80–90% >90% Galloway: 40–50% 50–60% 60–70% 70–80% 80–90% >90% Tie: 40–50% 50% No data
Governor before election
Mike Parson
Republican
Elected Governor
Mike Parson
Republican

The 2020 Missouri gubernatorial election was held on November 3, 2020, to elect the governor of Missouri, concurrently with the 2020 U.S. presidential election, as well as elections to the United States Senate, elections to the United States House of Representatives, and various state and local elections. Incumbent Republican governor Mike Parson ran for and was elected to a full term in office. Parson was elected as lieutenant governor in 2016 but became governor on June 1, 2018, after incumbent Eric Greitens resigned under threat of impeachment by the state legislature. Parson declared his bid for a full term on September 8, 2019. State Auditor Nicole Galloway, Missouri's only Democratic statewide officer and only female statewide officer, was the Democratic nominee and if elected, would have become Missouri's first female governor.

In October 2020, The Washington Post identified this state election as one of eight whose outcomes could affect partisan balance during post-census redistricting.

Despite most news agencies characterizing the race as only leaning Republican, Mike Parson went on to win the election by a landslide of 16.4%, widely outperforming all election polling as well as justifying the former swing state's trend towards the GOP. He even exceeded Donald Trump's statewide victory margin in the concurrent presidential election, which was actually greater than that in neighboring Kansas for the first time in 104 years. Galloway suffered the largest margin of defeat for a Democratic gubernatorial candidate in Missouri since Betty Hearnes' 29-point loss in 1988. The 1988 election was also the last election until this one in which Missouri elected a Republican for governor by double digits.

== Republican primary ==
=== Candidates ===
==== Nominee ====
- Mike Parson, incumbent governor of Missouri and former state senator

==== Eliminated in primary ====
- Saundra McDowell, U.S. Air Force veteran and Republican nominee for Missouri state auditor in 2018
- Jim Neely, state representative from the 8th district
- Raleigh Ritter, rancher and businessman

==== Declined ====
- Jay Ashcroft, Missouri Secretary of State
- Eric Greitens, former governor of Missouri
- Tony Monetti, retired bomber pilot, assistant dean of aviation at University of Central Missouri, and Republican candidate for the U.S. Senate in 2018

=== Endorsements ===
Jim Neely

State officials

- Mike Moon, state representative from the 157th district
- Bryan Spencer, state representative from the 63rd district

=== Polling ===
| Poll source | Date(s) administered | Sample size (Note: Key: A – all adults RV – registered voters LV – likely voters V – unclear) | Margin of error | Mike Parson | Eric Greitens | Other / Undecided |
|---|---|---|---|---|---|---|
| | March 31, 2020 | Filing deadline, by which Greitens had not declared his candidacy | | | | |
| Remington Research Group/Missouri Scout | Jan 29–30, 2020 | 1,155 (LV) | ± 2.9% | 52% | 22% | 26% |
| American Viewpoint/Uniting Missouri (Note: Uniting Missouri is a PAC supporting Governor Mike Parson (R) in the 2020 Missouri gubernatorial election.) | Jan 20–22, 2020 | 1,200 (LV) | – | 56% | 30% | 11% |

=== Results ===
Results by county: Parson: 40–50%; 50–60%; 60–70%; 70–80%; 80–90%

Republican primary results
| Party | Candidate | Votes | % |
|---|---|---|---|
| Republican | Mike Parson (incumbent) | 511,566 | 74.93% |
| Republican | Saundra McDowell | 84,412 | 12.36% |
| Republican | Jim Neely | 59,514 | 8.72% |
| Republican | Raleigh Ritter | 27,264 | 3.99% |
| Total votes | | 682,756 | 100.00% |

== Democratic primary ==
=== Candidates ===
==== Nominee ====
- Nicole Galloway, Missouri state auditor

==== Eliminated in primary ====
- Eric Morrison, community leader and pastor
- Antoin Johnson
- Jimmie Matthews
- Robin Quaethem

==== Declined ====
- Sly James, former mayor of Kansas City, Missouri
- Jason Kander, former Missouri Secretary of State, Democratic nominee for U.S. Senate in 2016, former candidate for Mayor of Kansas City in 2019
- Claire McCaskill, former U.S. senator
- Scott Sifton, state senator from the 1st district and former state representative from the 96th district (endorsed Galloway)

=== Endorsements ===
Nicole Galloway

Federal politicians

- Kamala Harris, U.S. senator from California and 2020 Democratic nominee for vice president

Individuals

- Scott Sifton, state senator

Organizations

- 314 Action
- EMILY's List
- National Women's Political Caucus
- Planned Parenthood Action Fund

=== Results ===
Results by county: Galloway: >90%; 80–90%; 70–80%; 60–70%; 50–60%

Democratic primary results
| Party | Candidate | Votes | % |
|---|---|---|---|
| Democratic | Nicole Galloway | 455,203 | 84.62% |
| Democratic | Eric Morrison | 32,403 | 6.02% |
| Democratic | Jimmie Matthews | 20,586 | 3.83% |
| Democratic | Antoin Johnson | 20,254 | 3.77% |
| Democratic | Robin Quaethem | 9,481 | 1.76% |
| Total votes | | 537,927 | 100.00% |

== Other candidates ==
=== Libertarian Party ===
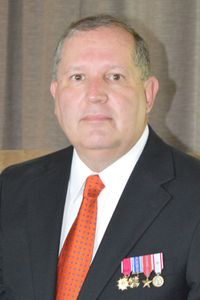
Rik Combs, the Libertarian nominee

==== Nominee ====
- Rik Combs, U.S. Air Force veteran

==== Results ====
Libertarian primary results
| Party | Candidate | Votes | % |
|---|---|---|---|
| Libertarian | Rik Combs | 4,171 | 100.00% |
| Total votes | | 4,171 | 100.00% |

=== Green Party ===
==== Nominee ====
- Jerome Bauer

==== Results ====
Green primary results
| Party | Candidate | Votes | % |
|---|---|---|---|
| Green | Jerome Bauer | 862 | 100.00% |
| Total votes | | 862 | 100.00% |

== General election ==
=== Predictions ===
| Source | Ranking | As of |
|---|---|---|
| The Cook Political Report | Lean R | October 23, 2020 |
| Inside Elections | Lean R | October 28, 2020 |
| Sabato's Crystal Ball | Lean R | November 2, 2020 |
| Politico | Lean R | November 2, 2020 |
| Daily Kos | Likely R | October 28, 2020 |
| RCP | Lean R | November 2, 2020 |
| 270towin | Lean R | November 2, 2020 |

=== Polling ===
View source data.

| Poll source | Date(s) administered | Sample size | Margin of error | Mike Parson (R) | Nicole Galloway (D) | Other / Undecided |
|---|---|---|---|---|---|---|
| Remington Research Group/Missouri Scout | October 28–29, 2020 | 1,010 (LV) | ± 3% | 50% | 44% | 5% (Note: Combs (L) with 2%; Bauer (G) with 1%; Undecided with 2%) |
| Cygnal (R) | October 18–20, 2020 | 600 (LV) | ± 4% | 48% | 42% | 10% (Note: Combs (L) with 2%; Bauer (G) with 1%; Undecided with 7%) |
| Remington Research Group/Missouri Scout | October 14–15, 2020 | 1,010 (LV) | ± 3% | 51% | 43% | 6% (Note: Combs (L) with 2%; Bauer (G) with 1%; Undecided with 3%) |
| YouGov | September 24 – October 7, 2020 | 931 (LV) | ± 3.9% | 50% | 44% | 7% (Note: "Other" with 3%; Undecided with 4%) |
| Garin-Hart-Yang Research (D) (Note: Poll sponsored by Galloway's campaign.) | September 28 – October 2, 2020 | 600 (LV) | ± 4.1% | 50% | 48% | – |
| Remington Research Group/Missouri Scout | September 30 – October 1, 2020 | 980 (LV) | ± 3% | 51% | 44% | 5% (Note: Undecided with 5%) |
| Remington Research Group/Missouri Scout | September 16–17, 2020 | 1,046 (LV) | ± 3% | 52% | 43% | 5% (Note: Undecided with 5%) |
| We Ask America | September 1–3, 2020 | 500 (LV) | ± 4.38% | 54% | 41% | 5% (Note: Undecided with 5%) |
| Trafalgar Group (R) | August 26–28, 2020 | 1,015 (LV) | ± 2.99% | 51% | 36% | 13% (Note: Combs (L) with 3%; Bauer (G) with 2%; Undecided with 8%) |
| Remington Research Group/Missouri Scout | August 12–13, 2020 | 1,112 (LV) | ± 3.0% | 50% | 43% | 7% (Note: Undecided with 7%) |
| Saint Louis University | June 23 – July 1, 2020 | 900 (LV) | ± 4.0% | 41% | 39% | 20% (Note: Undecided with 17%; "Other" with 3%) |
| Garin-Hart-Yang/Missouri Scout (D) | June 16–22, 2020 | 800 (LV) | ± 3.5% | 47% | 40% | – |
| Remington Research Group/Missouri Scout | June 10–11, 2020 | 1,152 (LV) | ± 2.9% | 50% | 41% | 9% |
| We Ask America | May 26–27, 2020 | 500 (LV) | ± 4.4% | 47% | 39% | 15% (Note: Undecided with 15%) |
| Remington Research Group/Missouri Scout | April 28–29, 2020 | 1,356 (LV) | ± 2.6% | 52% | 39% | 9% |
| Remington Research Group/Missouri Scout | March 11–12, 2020 | 1,241 (LV) | – | 52% | 39% | 7% |
| American Viewpoint (R) | January 20–22, 2020 | 1,200 (LV) | – | 54% | 36% | 7% |
| Human Agency/Missouri Scout | December 20–24, 2019 | 415 (RV) | ± 5% | 51% | 36% | 13% |
| Missouri Scout/Human Agency (D) | November 17–20, 2019 | 400 (RV) | ± 5.0% | 51% | 35% | 14% |
| Public Policy Polling (D) (Note: Poll sponsored by the Democratic Governors Association) | November 14–15, 2019 | 921 (LV) | – | 45% | 36% | 19% |
| Missouri Scout/Human Agency (D) | October 18–20, 2019 | 550 (RV) | ± 4.0% | 50% | 34% | 16% |
| Remington/Missouri Scout (R) | October 9–10, 2019 | 1,451 (LV) | ± 2.5% | 53% | 41% | 6% |
| Missouri Scout/Human Agency (D) | September 16–18, 2019 | 825 (RV) | ± 4.0% | 45% | 36% | 19% |
| Remington/Missouri Scout (R) | August 14–15, 2019 | 855 (LV) | ± 3.3% | 50% | 39% | 11% |
| Remington/Missouri Scout (R) | June 26–27, 2019 | 960 (LV) | ± 3.2% | 50% | 37% | 13% |
| Remington/Missouri Scout (R) | February 27, 2019 | 893 (LV) | ± 3.4% | 51% | 40% | 9% |

Hypothetical polling

Eric Greitens vs Nicole Galloway

| Poll source | Date(s) administered | Sample size | Margin of error | Eric Greitens (R) | Nicole Galloway (D) | Other / Undecided |
|---|---|---|---|---|---|---|
| American Viewpoint (R) | January 20–22, 2020 | 1,200 (LV) | – | 44% | 45% | 7% |

Mike Parson vs Jason Kander

| Poll source | Date(s) administered | Sample size | Margin of error | Mike Parson (R) | Jason Kander (D) | Other / Undecided |
|---|---|---|---|---|---|---|
| Remington/Missouri Scout (R) | February 27, 2019 | 893 (LV) | ± 3.4% | 51% | 36% | 13% |

Mike Parson vs. Scott Sifton

| Poll source | Date(s) administered | Sample size | Margin of error | Mike Parson (R) | Scott Sifton (D) | Other / Undecided |
|---|---|---|---|---|---|---|
| Remington/Missouri Scout (R) | February 27, 2019 | 893 (LV) | ± 3.4% | 52% | 32% | 16% |

=== Endorsements ===
Nicole Galloway (D)

Federal politicians

- Joe Biden, 47th vice president of the United States and 2020 Democratic nominee for president
- Emanuel Cleaver, U.S. representative from Missouri's 5th district
- Kamala Harris, U.S. senator from California and 2020 Democratic nominee for vice president
- Barack Obama, 44th president of the United States (2009–2017), U.S. senator from Illinois (2005–2008)
- Elizabeth Warren, U.S. senator from Massachusetts and former 2020 presidential candidate

State officials

- Jay Nixon, former governor of Missouri

Local officials

- Pete Buttigieg, mayor of South Bend, Indiana (2012–2020) and former 2020 presidential candidate
- Quinton Lucas, mayor of Kansas City

Individuals

- Andy Cohen, Bravo host
- Scott Sifton, state senator from the 1st district

Unions

- Missouri AFL–CIO

Organizations

- 314 Action
- Brady Campaign
- EMILY's List
- National Women's Political Caucus
- Planned Parenthood Action Fund

=== Results ===
State Senate districts results

State House districts results

2020 Missouri gubernatorial election
| Party | Candidate | Votes | % | ±% |
|---|---|---|---|---|
| Republican | Mike Parson (incumbent) | 1,720,202 | 57.11% | +5.97% |
| Democratic | Nicole Galloway | 1,225,771 | 40.69% | −4.88% |
| Libertarian | Rik Combs | 49,067 | 1.63% | +0.16% |
| Green | Jerome Bauer | 17,234 | 0.57% | −0.18% |
| Write-in | | 13 | 0.00% | – |
| Total votes | | 3,012,287 | 100.00% | N/A |
| Republican hold | | | | |

==== By county ====
| County | Mike Parson Republican | | Nicole Galloway Democratic | | Various candidates Other parties | | Margin | | Total |
| County | # | % | # | % | # | % | # | % | Total |
|---|---|---|---|---|---|---|---|---|---|
| Adair | 6,597 | 63.94% | 3,546 | 34.37% | 175 | 1.70% | 3,051 | 29.57% | 10,318 |
| Andrew | 7,195 | 73.92% | 2,356 | 24.21% | 182 | 1.87% | 4,839 | 49.72% | 9,733 |
| Atchison | 2,171 | 78.38% | 533 | 19.24% | 66 | 2.38% | 1,638 | 59.13% | 2,770 |
| Audrain | 7,643 | 72.05% | 2,663 | 25.10% | 302 | 2.85% | 4,980 | 46.95% | 10,608 |
| Barry | 12,356 | 79.57% | 2,841 | 18.30% | 331 | 2.13% | 9,515 | 61.28% | 15,528 |
| Barton | 5,114 | 84.78% | 816 | 13.53% | 102 | 1.69% | 4,298 | 71.25% | 6,032 |
| Bates | 6,410 | 76.70% | 1,762 | 21.08% | 185 | 2.21% | 4,648 | 55.62% | 8,357 |
| Benton | 8,017 | 76.84% | 2,179 | 20.89% | 237 | 2.27% | 5,838 | 55.96% | 10,433 |
| Bollinger | 5,063 | 85.12% | 773 | 13.00% | 112 | 1.88% | 4,290 | 72.13% | 5,948 |
| Boone | 40,478 | 44.63% | 48,056 | 52.98% | 2,171 | 2.39% | -7,578 | -8.35% | 90,705 |
| Buchanan | 22,147 | 60.85% | 13,225 | 36.34% | 1,022 | 2.81% | 8,922 | 24.52% | 36,394 |
| Butler | 14,337 | 79.63% | 3,349 | 18.60% | 318 | 1.77% | 10,988 | 61.03% | 18,004 |
| Caldwell | 3,603 | 77.48% | 916 | 19.70% | 131 | 2.82% | 2,687 | 57.78% | 4,650 |
| Callaway | 14,950 | 70.85% | 5,611 | 26.59% | 540 | 2.56% | 9,339 | 44.26% | 21,101 |
| Camden | 18,837 | 76.18% | 5,461 | 22.08% | 430 | 1.74% | 13,376 | 54.09% | 24,728 |
| Cape Girardeau | 29,127 | 72.53% | 10,272 | 25.58% | 762 | 1.90% | 18,855 | 46.95% | 40,161 |
| Carroll | 3,671 | 81.61% | 770 | 17.12% | 57 | 1.27% | 2,901 | 64.50% | 4,498 |
| Carter | 2,412 | 84.31% | 401 | 14.02% | 48 | 1.68% | 2,011 | 70.29% | 2,861 |
| Cass | 37,025 | 64.79% | 18,770 | 32.85% | 1,347 | 2.36% | 18,255 | 31.95% | 57,142 |
| Cedar | 5,771 | 82.10% | 1,104 | 15.71% | 154 | 2.19% | 4,667 | 66.40% | 7,029 |
| Chariton | 3,100 | 76.13% | 910 | 22.35% | 62 | 1.52% | 2,190 | 53.78% | 4,072 |
| Christian | 34,827 | 74.64% | 10,863 | 23.28% | 970 | 2.08% | 23,964 | 51.36% | 46,660 |
| Clark | 2,667 | 79.09% | 648 | 19.22% | 57 | 1.69% | 2,019 | 59.88% | 3,372 |
| Clay | 64,682 | 51.38% | 58,224 | 46.25% | 2,972 | 2.36% | 6,458 | 5.13% | 125,878 |
| Clinton | 7,518 | 69.46% | 3,001 | 27.73% | 305 | 2.82% | 4,517 | 41.73% | 10,824 |
| Cole | 26,886 | 67.94% | 11,726 | 29.63% | 961 | 2.43% | 15,160 | 38.31% | 39,573 |
| Cooper | 6,224 | 71.82% | 2,162 | 24.95% | 280 | 3.23% | 4,062 | 46.87% | 8,666 |
| Crawford | 8,480 | 77.57% | 2,230 | 20.40% | 222 | 2.03% | 6,250 | 57.17% | 10,932 |
| Dade | 3,348 | 81.56% | 668 | 16.27% | 89 | 2.17% | 2,680 | 65.29% | 4,105 |
| Dallas | 6,646 | 82.10% | 1,294 | 15.99% | 155 | 1.91% | 5,352 | 66.11% | 8,095 |
| Daviess | 2,997 | 77.24% | 783 | 20.18% | 100 | 2.58% | 2,214 | 57.06% | 3,880 |
| DeKalb | 3,763 | 78.14% | 930 | 19.31% | 123 | 2.55% | 2,833 | 58.82% | 4,816 |
| Dent | 5,768 | 81.09% | 1,141 | 16.04% | 204 | 2.87% | 4,627 | 65.05% | 7,113 |
| Douglas | 5,773 | 82.81% | 1,046 | 15.01% | 152 | 2.18% | 4,727 | 67.81% | 6,971 |
| Dunklin | 7,880 | 76.44% | 2,281 | 22.13% | 148 | 1.44% | 5,599 | 54.31% | 10,309 |
| Franklin | 37,136 | 69.58% | 14,957 | 28.03% | 1,277 | 2.39% | 22,179 | 41.56% | 53,370 |
| Gasconade | 6,192 | 78.68% | 1,537 | 19.53% | 141 | 1.79% | 4,655 | 59.15% | 7,870 |
| Gentry | 2,539 | 78.85% | 631 | 19.60% | 50 | 1.55% | 1,908 | 59.25% | 3,220 |
| Greene | 84,582 | 59.72% | 53,519 | 37.79% | 3,523 | 2.49% | 31,063 | 21.93% | 141,624 |
| Grundy | 3,537 | 79.91% | 821 | 18.55% | 68 | 1.54% | 2,716 | 61.36% | 4,426 |
| Harrison | 3,139 | 82.61% | 602 | 15.84% | 59 | 1.55% | 2,537 | 66.76% | 3,800 |
| Henry | 7,928 | 74.00% | 2,574 | 24.02% | 212 | 1.98% | 5,354 | 49.97% | 10,714 |
| Hickory | 4,037 | 79.74% | 929 | 18.35% | 97 | 1.92% | 3,108 | 61.39% | 5,063 |
| Holt | 1,928 | 82.64% | 361 | 15.47% | 44 | 1.89% | 1,567 | 67.17% | 2,333 |
| Howard | 3,525 | 69.58% | 1,387 | 27.38% | 154 | 3.04% | 2,138 | 42.20% | 5,066 |
| Howell | 14,947 | 80.67% | 3,210 | 17.33% | 371 | 2.00% | 11,737 | 63.35% | 18,528 |
| Iron | 3,266 | 72.08% | 1,105 | 24.39% | 160 | 3.53% | 2,161 | 47.69% | 4,531 |
| Jackson | 128,938 | 38.91% | 194,273 | 58.63% | 8,148 | 2.46% | -65,335 | -19.72% | 331,359 |
| Jasper | 37,714 | 72.30% | 13,204 | 25.31% | 1,243 | 2.38% | 24,510 | 46.99% | 52,161 |
| Jefferson | 73,942 | 63.91% | 38,866 | 33.59% | 2,886 | 2.49% | 35,076 | 30.32% | 115,694 |
| Johnson | 15,321 | 66.53% | 6,895 | 29.94% | 811 | 3.52% | 8,426 | 36.59% | 23,027 |
| Knox | 1,516 | 82.66% | 294 | 16.03% | 24 | 1.31% | 1,222 | 66.63% | 1,834 |
| Laclede | 13,681 | 81.58% | 2,747 | 16.38% | 342 | 2.04% | 10,934 | 65.20% | 16,770 |
| Lafayette | 12,238 | 71.85% | 4,451 | 26.13% | 344 | 2.02% | 7,787 | 45.72% | 17,033 |
| Lawrence | 14,176 | 79.58% | 3,185 | 17.88% | 452 | 2.54% | 10,991 | 61.70% | 17,813 |
| Lewis | 3,638 | 79.64% | 880 | 19.26% | 50 | 1.09% | 2,758 | 60.38% | 4,568 |
| Lincoln | 21,014 | 72.70% | 7,116 | 24.62% | 775 | 2.68% | 13,898 | 48.08% | 28,905 |
| Linn | 4,275 | 75.12% | 1,308 | 22.98% | 108 | 1.90% | 2,967 | 52.13% | 5,691 |
| Livingston | 5,258 | 78.37% | 1,332 | 19.85% | 119 | 1.77% | 3,926 | 58.52% | 6,709 |
| Macon | 6,096 | 78.18% | 1,575 | 20.20% | 126 | 1.62% | 4,521 | 57.98% | 7,797 |
| Madison | 4,362 | 77.09% | 1,126 | 19.90% | 170 | 3.00% | 3,236 | 57.19% | 5,658 |
| Maries | 3,875 | 81.20% | 815 | 17.08% | 82 | 1.72% | 3,060 | 64.12% | 4,772 |
| Marion | 10,082 | 75.91% | 3,015 | 22.70% | 185 | 1.39% | 7,067 | 53.21% | 13,282 |
| McDonald | 7,325 | 81.69% | 1,438 | 16.04% | 204 | 2.28% | 5,887 | 65.65% | 8,967 |
| Mercer | 1,533 | 86.86% | 204 | 11.56% | 28 | 1.59% | 1,329 | 75.30% | 1,765 |
| Miller | 10,213 | 82.86% | 1,888 | 15.32% | 225 | 1.83% | 8,325 | 67.54% | 12,326 |
| Mississippi | 3,521 | 74.99% | 1,106 | 23.56% | 68 | 1.45% | 2,415 | 51.44% | 4,695 |
| Moniteau | 5,784 | 80.87% | 1,237 | 17.30% | 131 | 1.83% | 4,547 | 63.58% | 7,152 |
| Monroe | 3,472 | 78.23% | 900 | 20.28% | 66 | 1.49% | 2,572 | 57.95% | 4,438 |
| Montgomery | 4,416 | 76.81% | 1,239 | 21.55% | 94 | 1.64% | 3,177 | 55.26% | 5,749 |
| Morgan | 7,372 | 77.96% | 1,880 | 19.88% | 204 | 2.16% | 5,492 | 58.08% | 9,456 |
| New Madrid | 5,338 | 74.39% | 1,723 | 24.01% | 115 | 1.60% | 3,615 | 50.38% | 7,176 |
| Newton | 22,031 | 77.89% | 5,692 | 20.12% | 562 | 1.99% | 16,339 | 57.77% | 28,285 |
| Nodaway | 6,900 | 70.08% | 2,759 | 28.02% | 187 | 1.90% | 4,141 | 42.06% | 9,846 |
| Oregon | 3,770 | 80.42% | 840 | 17.92% | 78 | 1.66% | 2,930 | 62.50% | 4,688 |
| Osage | 6,512 | 86.43% | 927 | 12.30% | 95 | 1.26% | 5,585 | 74.13% | 7,534 |
| Ozark | 3,963 | 82.25% | 769 | 15.96% | 86 | 1.78% | 3,194 | 66.29% | 4,818 |
| Pemiscot | 4,030 | 71.98% | 1,490 | 26.61% | 79 | 1.41% | 2,540 | 45.37% | 5,599 |
| Perry | 7,595 | 81.13% | 1,630 | 17.41% | 136 | 1.45% | 5,965 | 63.72% | 9,361 |
| Pettis | 13,645 | 71.85% | 4,876 | 25.68% | 470 | 2.47% | 8,769 | 46.17% | 18,991 |
| Phelps | 13,408 | 68.72% | 5,621 | 28.81% | 482 | 2.47% | 7,787 | 39.91% | 19,511 |
| Pike | 5,727 | 74.73% | 1,810 | 23.62% | 127 | 1.66% | 3,917 | 51.11% | 7,664 |
| Platte | 29,616 | 51.84% | 26,293 | 46.02% | 1,222 | 2.14% | 3,323 | 5.82% | 57,131 |
| Polk | 12,319 | 81.73% | 2,475 | 16.42% | 278 | 1.84% | 9,844 | 65.31% | 15,072 |
| Pulaski | 10,261 | 71.93% | 3,599 | 25.23% | 405 | 2.84% | 6,662 | 46.70% | 14,265 |
| Putnam | 1,984 | 85.15% | 323 | 13.86% | 23 | 0.99% | 1,661 | 71.29% | 2,330 |
| Ralls | 4,351 | 77.24% | 1,216 | 21.59% | 66 | 1.17% | 3,135 | 55.65% | 5,633 |
| Randolph | 7,842 | 73.28% | 2,532 | 23.66% | 328 | 3.06% | 5,310 | 49.62% | 10,702 |
| Ray | 7,964 | 68.93% | 3,279 | 28.38% | 310 | 2.68% | 4,685 | 40.55% | 11,553 |
| Reynolds | 2,501 | 77.72% | 633 | 19.67% | 84 | 2.61% | 1,868 | 58.05% | 3,218 |
| Ripley | 4,629 | 82.05% | 899 | 15.93% | 114 | 2.02% | 3,730 | 66.11% | 5,642 |
| Saline | 6,443 | 67.86% | 2,832 | 29.83% | 219 | 2.31% | 3,611 | 38.03% | 9,494 |
| Schuyler | 1,577 | 79.81% | 360 | 18.22% | 39 | 1.97% | 1,217 | 61.59% | 1,976 |
| Scotland | 1,584 | 81.02% | 342 | 17.49% | 29 | 1.48% | 1,242 | 63.53% | 1,955 |
| Scott | 13,535 | 76.80% | 3,794 | 21.53% | 294 | 1.67% | 9,741 | 55.27% | 17,623 |
| Shannon | 3,013 | 77.73% | 758 | 19.56% | 105 | 2.71% | 2,255 | 58.18% | 3,876 |
| Shelby | 2,698 | 81.05% | 576 | 17.30% | 55 | 1.65% | 2,122 | 63.74% | 3,329 |
| St. Charles | 128,230 | 58.12% | 87,888 | 39.84% | 4,496 | 2.04% | 40,342 | 18.29% | 220,614 |
| St. Clair | 3,880 | 78.01% | 995 | 20.00% | 99 | 1.99% | 2,885 | 58.00% | 4,974 |
| St. Francois | 19,258 | 69.37% | 7,682 | 27.67% | 823 | 2.96% | 11,576 | 41.70% | 27,763 |
| St. Louis City | 23,380 | 17.53% | 107,296 | 80.44% | 2,715 | 2.04% | -83,916 | -62.91% | 133,391 |
| St. Louis County | 207,535 | 38.77% | 317,327 | 59.28% | 10,417 | 1.95% | -109,792 | -20.51% | 535,279 |
| Ste. Genevieve | 6,180 | 65.93% | 3,011 | 32.12% | 182 | 1.94% | 3,169 | 33.81% | 9,373 |
| Stoddard | 11,269 | 84.51% | 1,855 | 13.91% | 210 | 1.57% | 9,414 | 70.60% | 13,334 |
| Stone | 14,704 | 79.84% | 3,399 | 18.46% | 314 | 1.70% | 11,305 | 61.38% | 18,417 |
| Sullivan | 1,985 | 81.02% | 441 | 18.00% | 24 | 0.98% | 1,544 | 63.02% | 2,450 |
| Taney | 20,221 | 77.32% | 5,323 | 20.35% | 610 | 2.33% | 14,898 | 56.96% | 26,154 |
| Texas | 9,239 | 81.94% | 1,795 | 15.92% | 242 | 2.15% | 7,444 | 66.02% | 11,276 |
| Vernon | 7,022 | 77.01% | 1,889 | 20.72% | 207 | 2.27% | 5,133 | 56.30% | 9,118 |
| Warren | 12,892 | 70.52% | 4,920 | 26.91% | 469 | 2.57% | 7,972 | 43.61% | 18,281 |
| Washington | 7,442 | 75.34% | 2,121 | 21.47% | 315 | 3.19% | 5,321 | 53.87% | 9,878 |
| Wayne | 4,801 | 82.59% | 900 | 15.48% | 112 | 1.93% | 3,901 | 67.11% | 5,813 |
| Webster | 14,715 | 78.71% | 3,577 | 19.13% | 404 | 2.16% | 11,138 | 59.57% | 18,696 |
| Worth | 869 | 79.36% | 205 | 18.72% | 21 | 1.92% | 664 | 60.64% | 1,095 |
| Wright | 7,343 | 84.63% | 1,181 | 13.61% | 153 | 1.76% | 6,162 | 71.02% | 8,677 |
| Totals | 1,720,202 | 57.11% | 1,225,771 | 40.69% | 66,314 | 2.20% | 494,431 | 16.41% | 3,012,287 |

==== By congressional district ====
Parson won six of eight congressional districts.

| District | Parson | Galloway | Representative |
|---|---|---|---|
| 1st | 19% | 78% | Lacy Clay (116th Congress) |
| 1st | 19% | 78% | Cori Bush (117th Congress) |
| 2nd | 51% | 48% | Ann Wagner |
| 3rd | 66% | 31% | Blaine Luetkemeyer |
| 4th | 66% | 31% | Vicky Hartzler |
| 5th | 40% | 57% | Emanuel Cleaver |
| 6th | 64% | 34% | Sam Graves |
| 7th | 70% | 27% | Billy Long |
| 8th | 76% | 22% | Jason Smith |

== See also ==
- 2020 Missouri elections

== Notes ==
Partisan clients
