= 1988 Missouri Secretary of State election =

- November 8, 1988
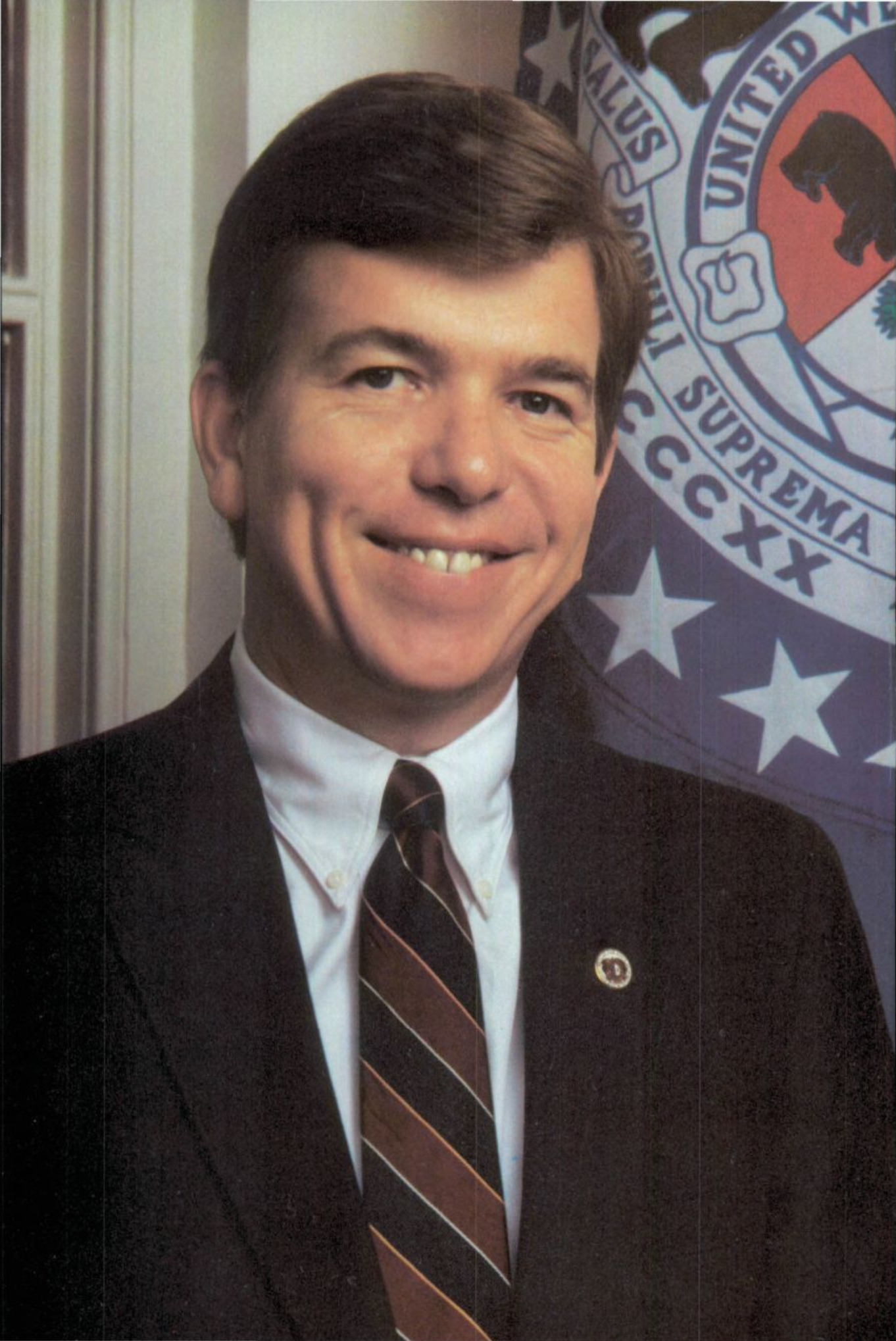

Nominee	Roy Blunt	James J. Askew
Party	Republican	Democratic
Popular vote	1,236,417	781,594
Percentage	60.75%	38.40%
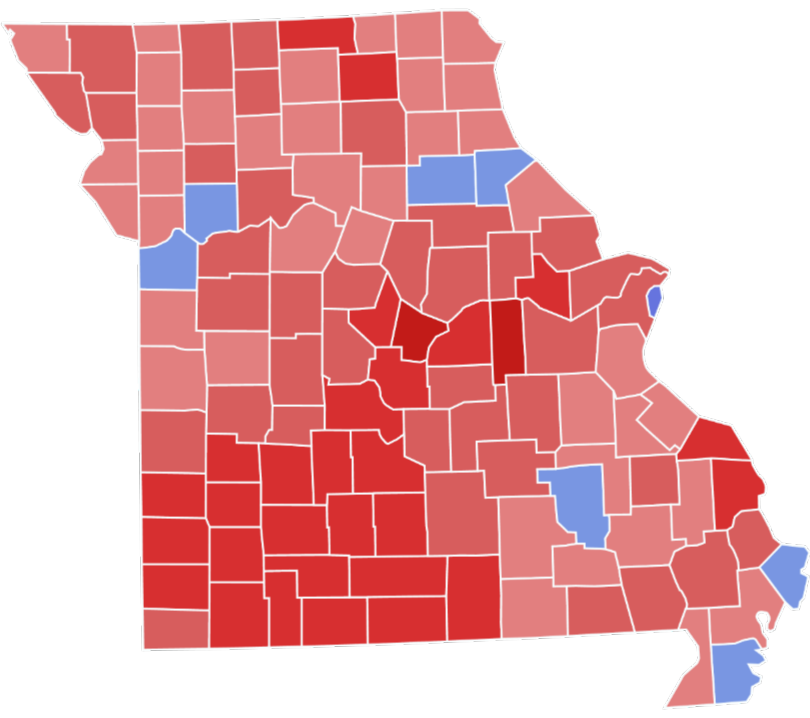
- County results Blunt: 50–60% 60–70% 70–80% Askew: 50–60% 60–70%
Secretary of State before election
Roy Blunt
Republican
Elected Secretary of State
Roy Blunt
Republican

The 1988 Missouri Secretary of State election was held on November 8, 1988, in order to elect the secretary of state of Missouri. Republican nominee and incumbent secretary of state Roy Blunt defeated Democratic nominee James J. Askew and Libertarian nominee Jay Manifold.

== General election ==
On election day, November 8, 1988, Republican nominee Roy Blunt won re-election by a margin of 454,823 votes against his foremost opponent Democratic nominee James J. Askew, thereby retaining Republican control over the office of secretary of state. Blunt was sworn in for his second term on January 9, 1989.

=== Results ===
Missouri Secretary of State election, 1988
Party	Candidate	Votes	%
Republican	Roy Blunt (incumbent)	1,236,417	60.75
Democratic	James J. Askew	781,594	38.40
Libertarian	Jay Manifold	17,260	0.85
Total votes		2,035,271	100.00
Republican hold			

== See also ==
- 1988 Missouri gubernatorial election
