= Jami C. Shawley =

American military officer

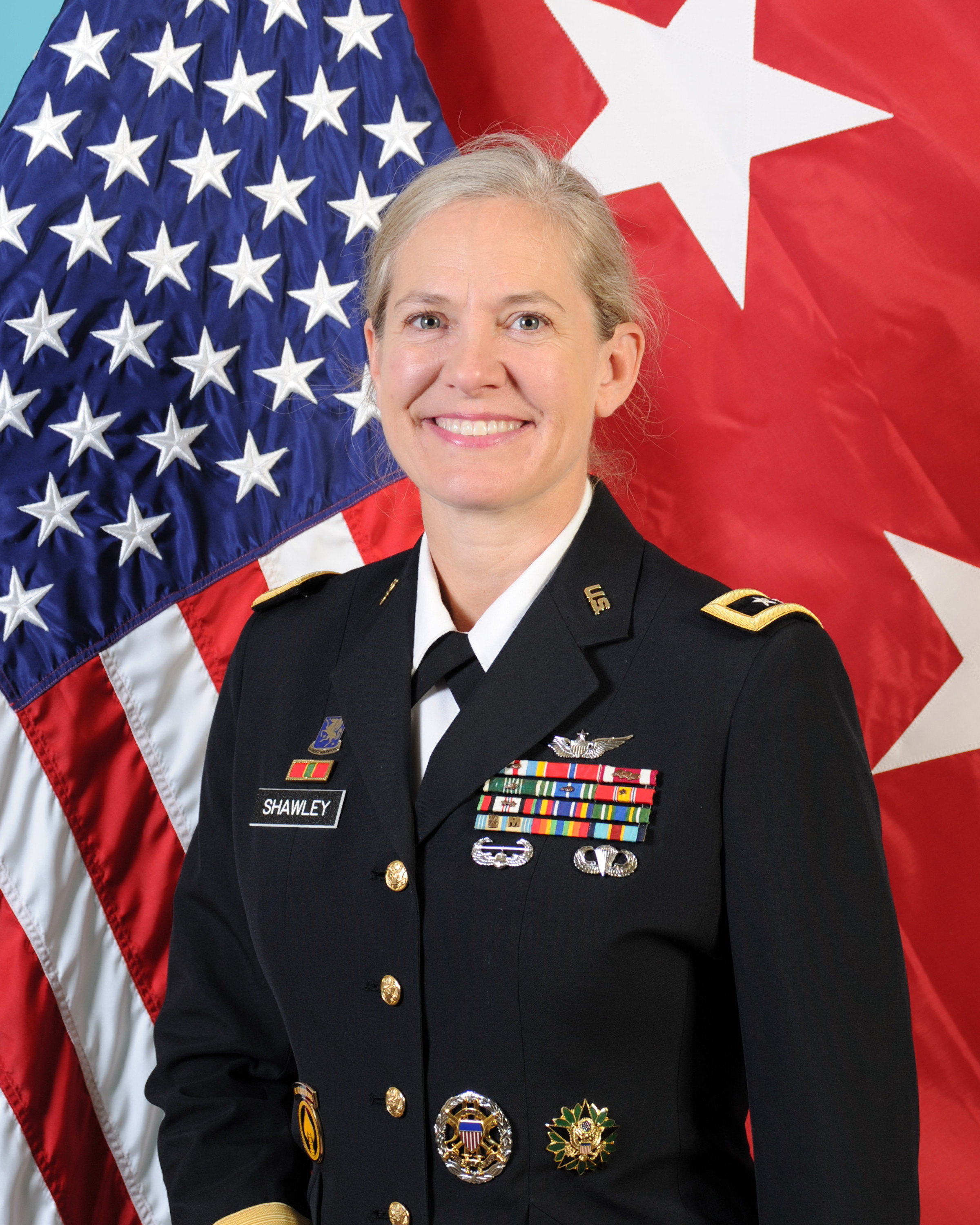
- Shawley in 2020

Personal details
- Education: United States Military Academy

Military service
- Branch/service: United States Army
- Years of service: 1992–2026
- Rank: Major General
- Battles/wars: Global War on Terror

Jamelle C. "Jami" Shawley is an American retired military officer. She was United States Army major general who served as the commanding general of Combined Joint Task Force – Horn of Africa, the only permanent American military base in Africa. On May 14, 2022, she became the first female U.S. commanding general on African soil, replacing Major General William Zana at Camp Lemonnier which is used to support counterterrorism efforts in neighboring Somalia.

Shawley graduated from Charleston Missouri High School in 1988 and from West Point in 1992. She began her military career by flying AH-1 helicopters in Korea and serving in staff positions in the state of Georgia.

== See also ==
- Timeline of women in warfare and the military in the United States, 2011–present
- List of female United States military generals and flag officers
