= Ralph Baker =

Ralph Baker may refer to:

- Ralph Baker (general) (born 1960), United States Army Major General
- Ralph Baker (halfback) (1902–1977), American football player
- Ralph Baker (linebacker) (born 1942), American football player
- Ralph Baker Jr. (1945–2008), American broadcaster and actor
