= Charlie Babb =

American football player (born 1950)

No. 49
- Position: Safety

Personal information
- Born: February 4, 1950 (age 76); Sikeston, Missouri, U.S.
- Listed height: 6 ft 0 in (1.83 m)
- Listed weight: 190 lb (86 kg)

Career information
- High school: Charleston (Charleston, Missouri)
- College: Memphis
- NFL draft: 1972: 5th round, 129th overall pick

Career history
- Miami Dolphins (1972–1979)

Awards and highlights
- 2× Super Bowl champion (VII, VIII)

Career NFL statistics
- Interceptions: 12
- Fumble recoveries: 9
- Sacks: 2.5
- Stats at Pro Football Reference

Charles David Babb (born February 4, 1950) is an American former professional football player who was a safety for the Miami Dolphins from 1972 to 1979. He is a graduate of Charleston High School in Charleston, Missouri. He played college football for the Memphis Tigers.
