= Charleston High School (Missouri) =

School in Missouri, United States

Location
- Thorn Road; Charleston, Missouri; 36°54′57″N 89°20′10″W

Information
- School district: Charleston R-1 Public School
- Principal: Jennifer Ford
- Faculty: 24.16 (FTE)
- Grades: 7–12
- Enrollment: 349 (2023–24)
- Student to teacher ratio: 11.55
- Colors: Blue and white
- Team name: Blue Jays
- Newspaper: The Blue Print
- Website: www.charlestonbluejays.org/apps/pages/CHS/

Charleston Jr Sr High School is a public high school that serves 349 students from grades 7–12, located in Charleston, Missouri. The principal is Jennifer Ford.

== Athletics ==
Charleston has won 12 Missouri state high school boys basketball championships: 1975, 1980, 1983, 1986, 1987, 1989, 1990, 1992, 1996, 2007, 2012 and 2022. In addition, Charleston has finished in 2nd through 4th place 12 times in the state basketball championships from 1977 through 2020. Their basketball program has produced Ricky Frazier who was the 26th over all pick in the 1982 NBA draft to the Chicago Bulls. Their baseball program has produced professional athlete Matt Whiteside and James Naile. The football program produced Charlie Babb. Babb was a safety with the Miami Dolphins football team 1972–79 and was on the team that won the Super Bowl.

== Activities ==
Charleston High School offers multiple clubs and activities, including marching band, library club, National Honor Society and Students Against Drunk Driving.

== Notable alumni ==
- Matt Whiteside, Former MLB player (Texas Rangers, Philadelphia Phillies, San Diego Padres, Atlanta Braves, Toronto Blue Jays)
- Charlie Babb, Former NFL player
- James Naile, MLB pitcher for the St. Louis Cardinals
- Jami C. Shawley, military officer
