= William Zana =

United States Army general

William L. Zana
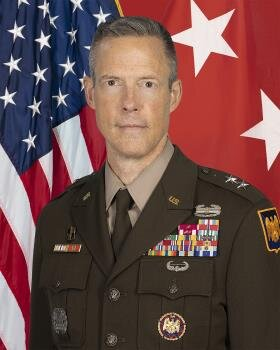
- Official portrait, 2022
- Born: 1966 (age 59–60)
- Alma mater: Park University (BBM); Marine Corps University (MMS) National Defense University (MNSS)
- Military career
- Allegiance: United States
- Branch: United States Army
- Service years: 1993–2024
- Rank: Major General
- Commands: Combined Joint Task Force - Horn of Africa; 91st Cyber Brigade; 3rd Battalion, 116th Infantry Brigade Combat Team
- Conflicts: War in Afghanistan
- Awards: Defense Superior Service Medal; Legion of Merit (2); Bronze Star Medal

William L. Zana (born 1966) is a retired United States Army major general from the Army National Guard who served as the commanding general of Combined Joint Task Force - Horn of Africa from May 15, 2020 to May 14, 2022. He previously served as Deputy Director for J-5 Politico-Military Affairs (Africa) on the Joint Staff and, as a brigadier general, led CJTF-HOA from May to June 2018.

== Tomb Guard ==
William Zana joined the 3d U.S. Infantry Regiment (The Old Guard) as a private in 1987 and received his Tomb Guard badge (#354) when he was a sergeant. He would go on to become the only sentinel to become a general officer. After 37 years of service, Zana returned to the Tomb of the Unknown Soldier for one final guard shift. He spent his last hours of military service walking the plaza to honor the unknowns.

== Dates of rank ==
Insignia	Rank	Date
	Major general	May 17, 2021
	Brigadier general	December 27, 2017
	Colonel	September 21, 2012
	Lieutenant colonel	August 8, 2008
	Major	February 13, 2003
	Captain	September 3, 1998
	First lieutenant	July 23, 1996
	Second lieutenant	July 24, 1993

Military offices
Preceded by Lapthe C. Flora	Commander of the 91st Cyber Brigade; 2016–2017	Succeeded by Adam C. Volant
Preceded by Howard P. Purcell	Deputy Commanding General of Combined Joint Task Force - Horn of Africa; 2018	Succeeded by ???
Preceded by David J. Furness	Commanding General of Combined Joint Task Force - Horn of Africa; 2018	Succeeded by James D. Craig
Preceded by ???	Deputy Commander of Combined Joint Task Force - Horn of Africa; 2018–2019	Succeeded by ???
Preceded by Lapthe C. Flora	Commanding General of Combined Joint Task Force - Horn of Africa; 2021–2022	Succeeded by Jami C. Shawley
