= Brian L. Losey =

American retired naval officer (born 1960)

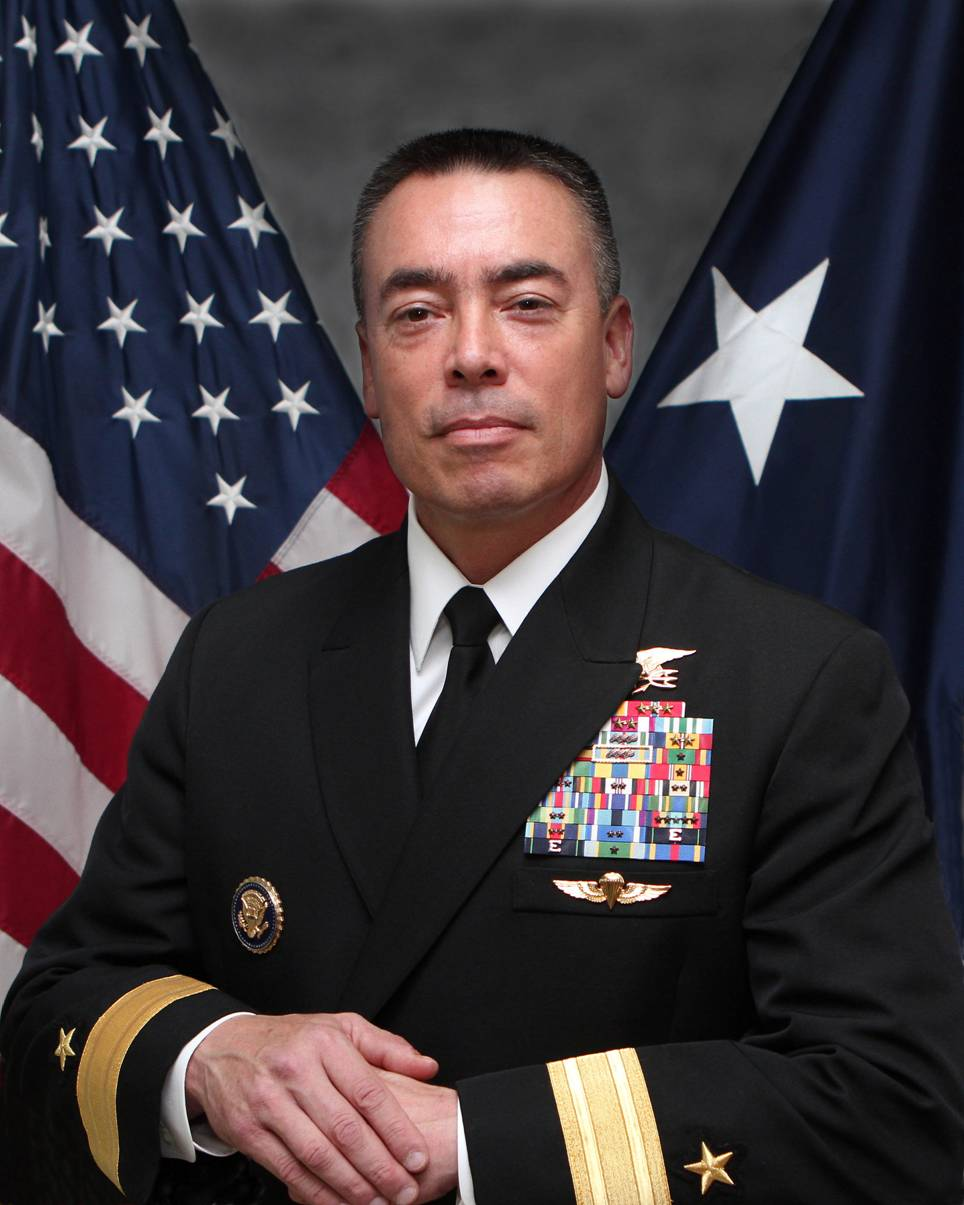
- Rear Admiral Brian L. Losey in his official United States Navy photo.
- Born: November 11, 1960 (age 65); Tacoma, Washington, U.S.
- Military career
- Allegiance: United States of America
- Branch: United States Navy
- Service years: 1983–2016
- Rank: Rear Admiral
- Commands: Naval Special Warfare Command; Special Operations Command Africa; Combined Joint Task Force – Horn of Africa Naval Special Warfare Development Group SEAL Delivery Vehicle Team 1
- Conflicts: War in Afghanistan; Iraq War
- Awards: Navy Distinguished Service Medal; Defense Superior Service Medal (3)

Brian Lee Losey (born November 11, 1960) is a retired rear admiral of the United States Navy. He headed the Naval Special Warfare Command from 2013 until his retirement in 2016. Losey is a native of Tacoma, Washington.

== Education ==
A graduate of the United States Air Force Academy, class of 1983, Losey also holds a Master's degree in National Security Strategy from the National War College, which he received in 2004. He is a graduate of the Defense Language Institute, the Armed Forces Staff College, and Air Command and Staff College.

== Navy career ==
He attended Basic Underwater Demolition/SEAL (BUD/S) training in Coronado, Calif., and graduated from BUD/S class 126 in 1984 and was assigned to SEAL Delivery Vehicle Team ONE (SDVT-1). His operational assignments have included a full range of duties in SEAL Teams, SEAL Delivery Vehicle (SDV) Teams and Special Boat Teams, and deployments to named and contingency operations around the world. Losey served with Special Boat Unit 26 from 1990 to 1992 before receiving an assignment to Naval Special Warfare Development Group (DEVGRU) and completing a specialized selection and training course known as green team in 1993. At DEVGRU he had served as an operations officer and assault group commander. Losey commanded SDVT-1 from 2001 to 2003 and served as deputy commander, then commanding officer of DEVGRU from 2005 to 2007.

Other assignments include: duty as deputy commander, Naval Special Warfare Task Group, U.S. 6th Fleet; Maritime Operations officer and deputy chief of Current Operations in the Joint Special Operations Command; and U.S. 7th Fleet Special Warfare officer in USS Blue Ridge (LCC 19). He served in the Executive Office of the President as a director on the National Security Council Staff bridging two administrations. On December 14, 2011, the U.S. Senate confirmed Losey's appointment as rear admiral (lower half).

Losey assumed command of Naval Special Warfare Command in Coronado, CA in June 2013. Previously he was Commander, Special Operations Command Africa and Commander, Combined Joint Task Force – Horn of Africa (CJTF-HoA), Camp Lemonnier, Djibouti. On March 21, 2016, the Navy announced that Losey was being denied promotion to rear admiral (upper half) following the Inspector General's review of allegations of retaliation taken against subordinates (see detail below). The U.S. Senate blocked Losey's promotion based on these retaliation claims that were confirmed by the Pentagon's Inspector General. The Navy had sought to disregard those findings by promoting Losey before the Senate intervened, effectively ending Losey's career.

Based on the recommendations provided by the Board for Correction of Naval Records, then Secretary of the Navy, Ray Mabus, approved the retroactive promotion of Losey to January 12, 2017. The retroactive date was set to Losey's eligibility date to two-star rear admiral. Along with his promotion to second star, Rear Admiral Losey received back pay and an increase to his annual military retirement pension. The accelerated review in 7 weeks and final week memo by Navy Secretary Ray Mabus granting the promotion were widely criticized by members of Congress and Naval law observers.

Losey is an Advisory Board Member of Spirit of America, a 501(c)(3) organization that supports the safety and success of Americans serving abroad and the local people and partners they seek to help.

Losey appeared in the 2024 documentary In Waves and War, which deals with the struggles of veterans with PTSD, and alternative therapies.

== Retaliation complaints ==
In 2011–2015, the Department of Defense Inspector General (DOD IG) investigated and upheld three out of five whistle-blower retaliation complaints against Admiral Losey after questioning 100 witnesses and amassing 300,000 pages of records.

According to The Washington Post, Losey "was investigated five times by the Defense Department’s inspector general after subordinates complained that he had wrongly fired, demoted or punished them during a vengeful but fruitless hunt for the person who had anonymously reported him for a minor travel-policy infraction."

The DOD IG found that Admiral Losey wrongly believed there was "a conspiracy to undermine his command". Inspector General recommended that the Navy discipline Losey for violating whistleblower-protection laws. Navy leadership reviewed the DOD Inspector General report and concluded that "none of the allegations rose to the level of misconduct on Admiral Losey’s part."

In a statement to the Congressional Record in December 2015, Senator Ron Wyden (D-Ore) said he had placed a hold on the nomination of Janine Davidson, a former Pentagon official and Air Force pilot, to become the next Navy undersecretary until the service reconsidered its decision not to punish Admiral Losey for his violations of the Whistleblower Protection Act of 1989. In April, 2016 the Navy decided to not promote Losey, paving the way for Davidson's appointment.

== Substantive support ==
William H. McRaven called him “without a doubt one of the finest officers with whom I have ever served. Over the past 15 years no officer I know in the SEAL Teams has given more to this country than Brian.” He described it as an example of a “disturbing trend in how politicians abuse and denigrate military leadership, particularly the officer corps, to advance their political agendas.”

On the House floor, Retired SEAL officer-turned-Republican Congressman Ryan Zinke (R-MT), rejected claims that Losey retaliated. “He saw a problem and took action”. “Once again, an entrusted, entrenched bureaucracy was allowed to hide behind threats, hide behind whistleblowers, hide behind rules that were intended to protect command and not to erode it.”

== Awards and decorations ==
Brian L. Losey received multiple awards and recognitions:

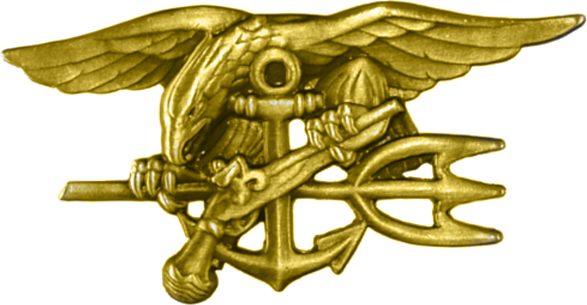

Badge	SEAL Insignia		
1st Row	Navy Distinguished Service Medal	Defense Superior Service Medal w/ 2 oak leaf clusters	Bronze Star w/ 3 award stars
2nd Row	Defense Meritorious Service Medal w/ 2 oak leaf clusters	Meritorious Service Medal w/ 2 award stars	Joint Service Commendation Medal
3rd Row	Navy and Marine Corps Commendation Medal w/ 1 award star	Joint Service Achievement Medal w/ 3 oak leaf clusters	Combat Action Ribbon w/ 2 award stars
4th Row	Navy Presidential Unit Citation w/ 1 service star	Joint Meritorious Unit Award w/ 3 oak leaf clusters	Navy Unit Commendation ribbon w/ 1 service star
5th Row	Navy Meritorious Unit Commendation w/ 1 service star	Navy Expeditionary Medal	National Defense Service Medal w/ 1 service star
6th Row	Armed Forces Expeditionary Medal w/ 3 service stars	Afghanistan Campaign Medal w/ 2 campaign stars	Iraq Campaign Medal w/ 2 campaign stars
7th Row	Global War on Terrorism Expeditionary Medal	Global War on Terrorism Service Medal	Korea Defense Service Medal
8th Row	Armed Forces Service Medal w/ 2 service stars	Humanitarian Service Medal	Sea Service Deployment Ribbon w/ 9 service stars
9th Row	Overseas Service Ribbon w/ 2 service stars	NATO Medal w/ 2 service star	Rifle Marksmanship Medal w/ Expert device
10th Row	Pistol Marksmanship Medal w/ Expert device	Air Force Small Arms Expert Marksmanship Ribbon w/ 1 service star	Air Force Training Ribbon
Badge	Navy and Marine Corps Parachutist Insignia		
Badge	Presidential Service Badge		
