= Jim Neely =

American politician and physician

Member of the Missouri House of Representatives from the 8th district
- In office January 9, 2013 – January 5, 2021
- Preceded by: Tom Shively
- Succeeded by: Randy Railsback

Personal details
- Born: 1950 or 1951 (age 74–75)
- Party: Republican
- Education: University of Missouri (BBA); Kansas City University (DO)

Military service
- Branch/service: United States Army

James W. Neely (born 1951) is an American politician and physician who served as a member of the Missouri House of Representatives from 2013 to 2021. He is also the long-term care medical director of the Cameron Regional Medical Center.

== Early life and education ==
After graduating from Grandview High School in 1969, Neely enrolled in the Army ROTC program at the University of Missouri where he graduated with a Bachelor's degree in business administration. After served as an officer in the United States Army, Neely graduated with a Doctor of Osteopathic Medicine degree from the University of Health Sciences College of Medicine in Kansas City.

== Career ==
Neely previously served on the Cameron School Board from 1995 to 2005. A member of the Republican Party, he was elected to the Missouri House of Representatives in 2012.

=== 2020 Missouri gubernatorial election ===
He was a candidate for the Republican nomination for governor of Missouri in 2020. Among his primary reasons behind running for governor were a discontent with how state government is being run, and a desire to help resolve issues in education, healthcare, and criminal reform. Neely placed third in the Republican primary in a field of four candidates.

== Electoral history ==
=== State representative ===
Missouri House of Representatives Election, November 6, 2012, District 8
Party	Candidate	Votes	%	±%
Republican	James W. (Jim) Neely	10,486	62.75%	
Democratic	James T. (Jim) Crenshaw	6,224	37.25%	

Missouri House of Representatives Election, November 4, 2014, District 8
Party	Candidate	Votes	%	±%
Republican	James W. (Jim) Neely	6,726	70.63%	+7.88
Democratic	Ted Rights	2,797	29.37%	−7.88

Missouri House of Representatives Election, November 8, 2016, District 8
Party	Candidate	Votes	%	±%
Republican	James W. (Jim) Neely	15,399	100.00%	+29.37

Missouri House of Representatives Election November 6, 2018, District 8
Party	Candidate	Votes	%	±%
Republican	James W. (Jim) Neely	10,906	71.77%	−28.23
Democratic	Caleb McKnight	4,289	28.23%	+28.23

=== Governor ===
Missouri Gubernatorial Primary Election, August 4, 2020
Party	Candidate	Votes	%	±%
Republican	Mike Parson	511,566	74.93	
Republican	Saundra McDowell	84,412	12.36	
Republican	Jim Neely	59,514	8.72	
Republican	Raleigh Ritter	27,264	3.99	
