= Randy Railsback =

American politician

Member of the Missouri House of Representatives from the 8th district
- In office January 5, 2021 – January 4, 2023
- Preceded by: Jim Neely
- Succeeded by: Josh Hurlbert (redistricting)

Personal details
- Born: St. Joseph, Missouri, U.S.
- Party: Republican
- Education: University of Oklahoma (BA)

Randy Railsback is an American politician who served as a member of the Missouri House of Representatives from the 8th district. Elected in November 2020, he assumed office on January 5, 2021.

== Early life and education ==
Railsback was born in St. Joseph, Missouri and was raised in Hamilton Missouri on the family farm. After graduating from Penney High School, he earned a certificate in economic development from the University of Oklahoma. Railsback spent his career in economic development and many other areas of rural development.

== Career ==
Railsback began his career in civil service and agriculture, serving as director of the Northwest Regional Council of Governments and Green Hills Regional Planning Commission. Railsback was elected to the Missouri House of Representatives in 2020, placing first in the Republican primary and running unopposed in the general election. He assumed office on January 5, 2021.

== Electoral history ==
=== State representative ===
Missouri House of Representatives Primary Election, August 4, 2020, District 8
| Party | Candidate | Votes | % | ±% |
|---|---|---|---|---|
| Republican | Randy Railsback | 2,959 | 44.58% | |
| Republican | David Woody | 2,214 | 33.35% | |
| Republican | Darlene Breckenridge | 1,096 | 16.51% | |
| Republican | Gary Stroud | 369 | 5.56% | |

Missouri House of Representatives Election, November 3, 2020, District 8
| Party | Candidate | Votes | % | ±% |
|---|---|---|---|---|
| Republican | Randy Railsback | 16,561 | 100.00% | |
