= Matt Whiteside =

American baseball player (born 1967)

- Pitcher
- Born: August 8, 1967 (age 58); Sikeston, Missouri, U.S.
- Batted: Right Threw: Right

MLB debut
- August 5, 1992, for the Texas Rangers

Last MLB appearance
- May 7, 2005, for the Toronto Blue Jays

MLB statistics
- Win–loss record: 18–15
- Earned run average: 5.23
- Strikeouts: 259
- Stats at Baseball Reference

Teams
- Texas Rangers (1992–1997); Philadelphia Phillies (1998); San Diego Padres (1999–2000); Atlanta Braves (2001); Yokohama BayStars (2003); Toronto Blue Jays (2005)

Matthew Christopher Whiteside (born August 8, 1967) is an American former Major League Baseball pitcher. He graduated from Charleston High School in Charleston, lettering in baseball, football, and basketball, in 1986, and then attended Arkansas State, graduating with a degree in physical education. While at Arkansas, Whiteside joined Pi Kappa Alpha fraternity.

Standing at 6'2" and weighing 205 pounds, the right-hander was drafted by the Texas Rangers 661st overall, in the 25th round of the 1990 draft. Whiteside spent nearly three successful seasons in the minors before making his Major League debut on August 5, 1992, at the age of 24. His first appearance came against the Oakland Athletics, pitching a perfect inning. In Whiteside's first season in the majors, he made 20 appearances, all in relief in relief, posting a 1.93 ERA and saving four games.

From 1993 to 2001, the lowest ERA Whiteside had in a season was 4.08, while the highest was 13.91. He started only one game in his major league career, on July 20, 1997. Whiteside pitched four innings, giving up six hits and five earned runs and received a no-decision.

After 13 games in the majors in 2001 with the Atlanta Braves (who picked him up as a free agent), Whiteside bounced around in the minors and international baseball (Yokohama BayStars in Japan in 2003) until 2005. By that time, he had established himself as a very successful closer in the minors, saving 38 games in 2004 with the Richmond Braves, making the International League All-Star team, and saving 27 games in 2005 for the Syracuse SkyChiefs. After the latter showing, Whiteside was called up to the majors for a two-game stint with the Toronto Blue Jays. He struggled in that short time—in 3 2/3 innings, he gave up eight earned runs (six hits, three home runs, five walks, one hit batter) for an ERA of 19.64.

On July 15, 2005, having returned to the minors, Whiteside was suspended for 15 games for violating minor league baseball's steroid policy. He spent 2006 with the Indianapolis Indians, posting a 1.69 ERA in 20 games, collecting 10 saves.

In 1996, he served as a guest judge at the Miss USA Pageant.
