= Lapthe Flora =

American major general (born 1962)

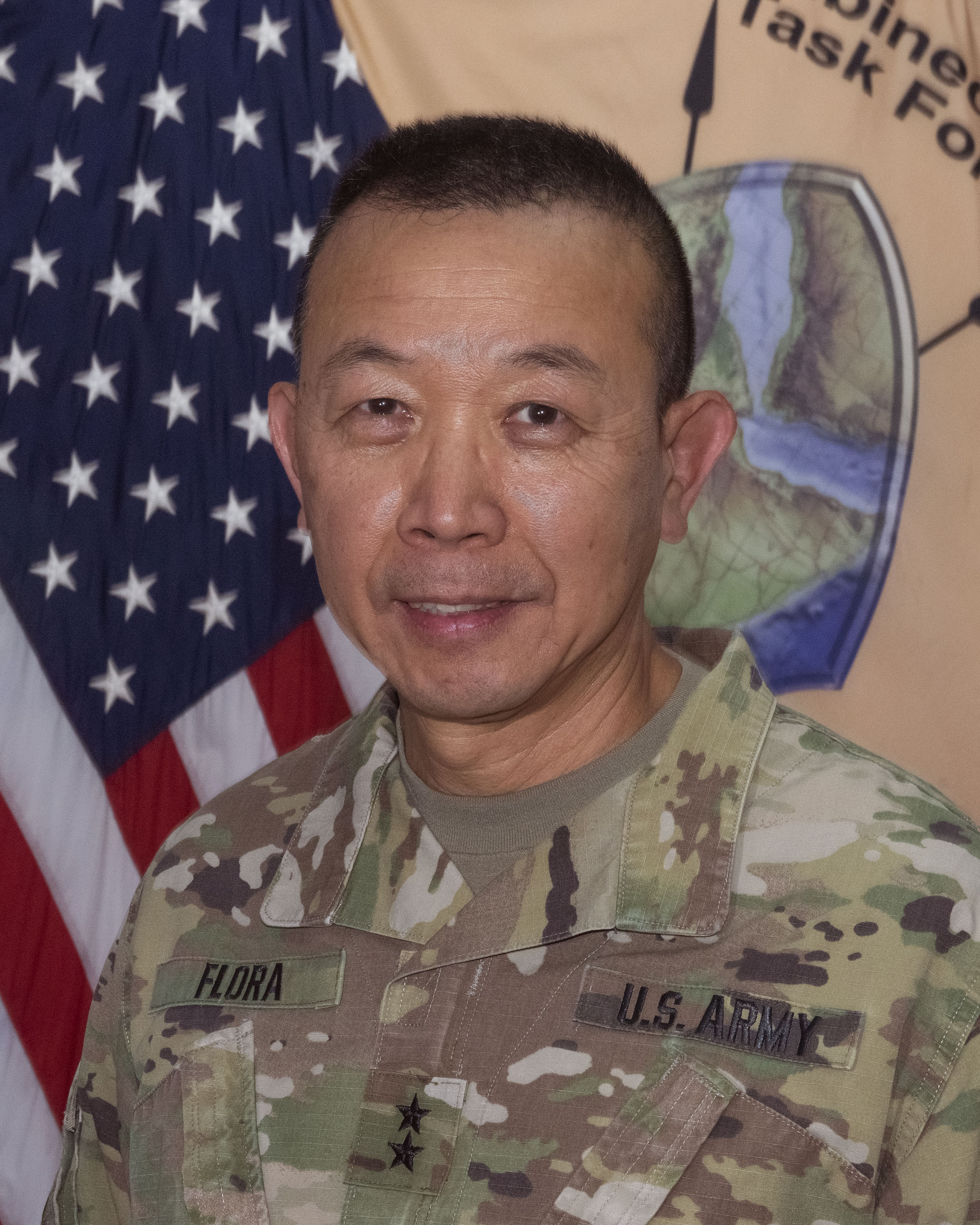
- Born: 1962 (age 63–64); South Vietnam
- Alma mater: Virginia Military Institute
- Military career
- Allegiance: United States
- Branch: United States Army
- Service years: 1988–2024
- Rank: Major General
- Commands: Combined Joint Task Force – Horn of Africa; 91st Troop Command, Virginia National Guard
- Conflicts: Yugoslav Wars; Stabilisation Force (SFOR); War in Afghanistan
- Awards: Defense Superior Service Medal; Legion of Merit; Bronze Star Medal

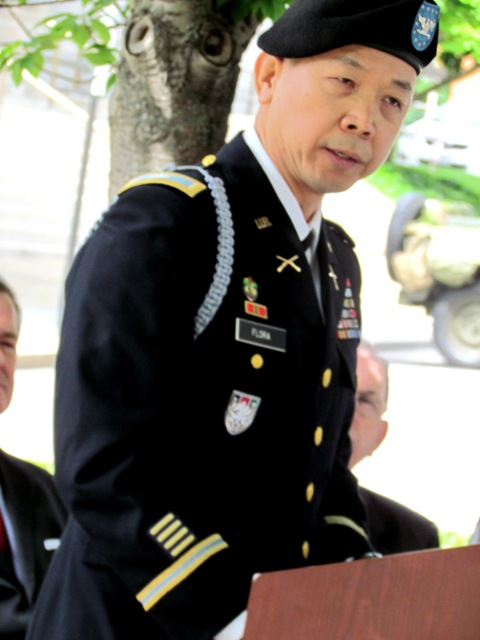
Colonel Flora speaking at the National Infantry Museum.

Lapthe Chau Flora (born Vietnamese: Châu Lập Thể) is a retired major general in the United States Army who last served as a special assistant to the director of the Army National Guard. He previously served as commander of Combined Joint Task Force – Horn of Africa. Flora is the former commander of the Bowling Green-based 91st Troop Command, Virginia National Guard. He also served as the Assistant Adjutant General of the Virginia National Guard in Sandston, Virginia. Concurrently, he served as a deputy commander of United States Army Africa, as well as Army Reserve Component Integration Advisor, United States Army Africa.

== Early life ==
Flora is the son of ethnic Chinese parents, born in South Vietnam in 1962. His father, a South Vietnamese Merchant Marine, was killed during the Vietnam War, when Flora was 2 years old. His mother was left a widow with six children. When he was 11 years old he worked in a factory to help his family and himself.

In 1980, five years after the end of the Vietnam War, Flora fled the city of Saigon, now renamed Ho Chi Minh City, to escape the indoctrination of communist principles initiated by the Hanoi government of Vietnam. He and several siblings lived in the jungle, surviving on snakes, rats, porcupines and vegetation. Flora escaped by boat with other refugees by sailing in the South China Sea. Their ship was later rescued and they were all taken to an Indonesian refugee camp. After a year at the camp, he was allowed to immigrate to the United States, where he was adopted by John and Audrey Flora.

In 1983, Flora graduated from Cave Spring High School in Roanoke, Virginia. He earned a degree in biological sciences from the Virginia Military Institute.

== Assignments ==
In 1988, Flora started his military career in the Virginia National Guard after graduating from the Virginia Military Institute and has since served in every staff position within 1st Battalion, 116th Infantry Regiment, 116th Infantry Brigade Combat Team, including as commander of that battalion.

Flora served as the 116th IBCT executive officer, 29th Infantry Division's director of operations and most recently as the Joint Force Headquarters – Virginia director of strategic plans. He has successfully completed three overseas deployments to Bosnia, Kosovo and Afghanistan. He has also participated in several security cooperation missions with the Republic of Tajikistan as part of the Department of Defense's State Partnership Program.

In May 2015, Flora assumed command of the Bowling Green-based 91st Troop Command, Virginia National Guard at the Army Aviation Support Facility in Sandston, Virginia. On 16 May 2016, he assumed duties as Assistant Adjutant General, with subsequent promotion to brigadier general.

In June 2019, the Senate Armed Services Committee nominated Flora for promotion to major general. In June 2020, he assumed command of Combined Joint Task Force – Horn of Africa.

== Civilian career ==
Flora is Director of Quality Assurance, Night Vision & Communications Solutions (NVCS) with Exelis Inc. in Roanoke, Va., and holds six patent awards related to the AN/PVS-14 and AN/AVS-9 night goggles.

== Family ==
Flora is married to Thuy and they have a daughter named Christine, a paramedic who is currently enrolled in medical school. His adopted father John Flora graduated from Virginia Military Institute in 1937, was a retired realtor, had been a battalion staff officer with the 116th Infantry Regiment when it landed on Omaha Beach on D-Day.

Military offices
Preceded by Michael D. Turello	Commander of Combined Joint Task Force – Horn of Africa; 2020–2021	Succeeded by William L. Zana
