= N. Rex Ghormley =

American optometrist

Norman Rex Ghormley (February 21, 1941 in San Bernardino, California – November 4, 2009) was an American optometrist who held leadership roles with the American Academy of Optometry and served as an optometrist for collegiate and professional sports teams.

== Biography ==
Ghormley graduated from the Southern California College of Optometry in 1964 and the same year joined the Vietnam War as a lieutenant in the Medical Service Corps of the United States Navy. His service was over in 1967, and he became a private practitioner in St. Louis, Missouri in 1970. He was an assistant professor at the St. Louis School of Optometry through 1976.

He was president of the Heart of America Contact Lens Society in 1980 and served on its board of directors from 1976 to 1982. In 1985 he was named Optometrist of the Year by the Heart of America Society and two years later was named a distinguished practitioner by the National Academy of Practice. He was on the executive council of the American Academy of Optometry between 1980 and 1994. In 2002, he was awarded a Lifetime Achievement Award by the St. Louis Optometric Society. A year later he received an AOA Contact Lens and Cornea Section Achievement Award and by 2006 was awarded the Eminent Service Award by the American Academy of Optometry. He was the namesake for the organization's N. Rex Ghormley Fund.

Ghormley was known for his optometric work with athletes. He spent several years as a team optometrist for the St. Louis Rams, St. Louis Blues and University of Missouri athletic teams. Although he was not a smoker, Ghormley developed lung cancer. He died on November 4, 2009.
