= Ralph Baker (general) =

United States Army general

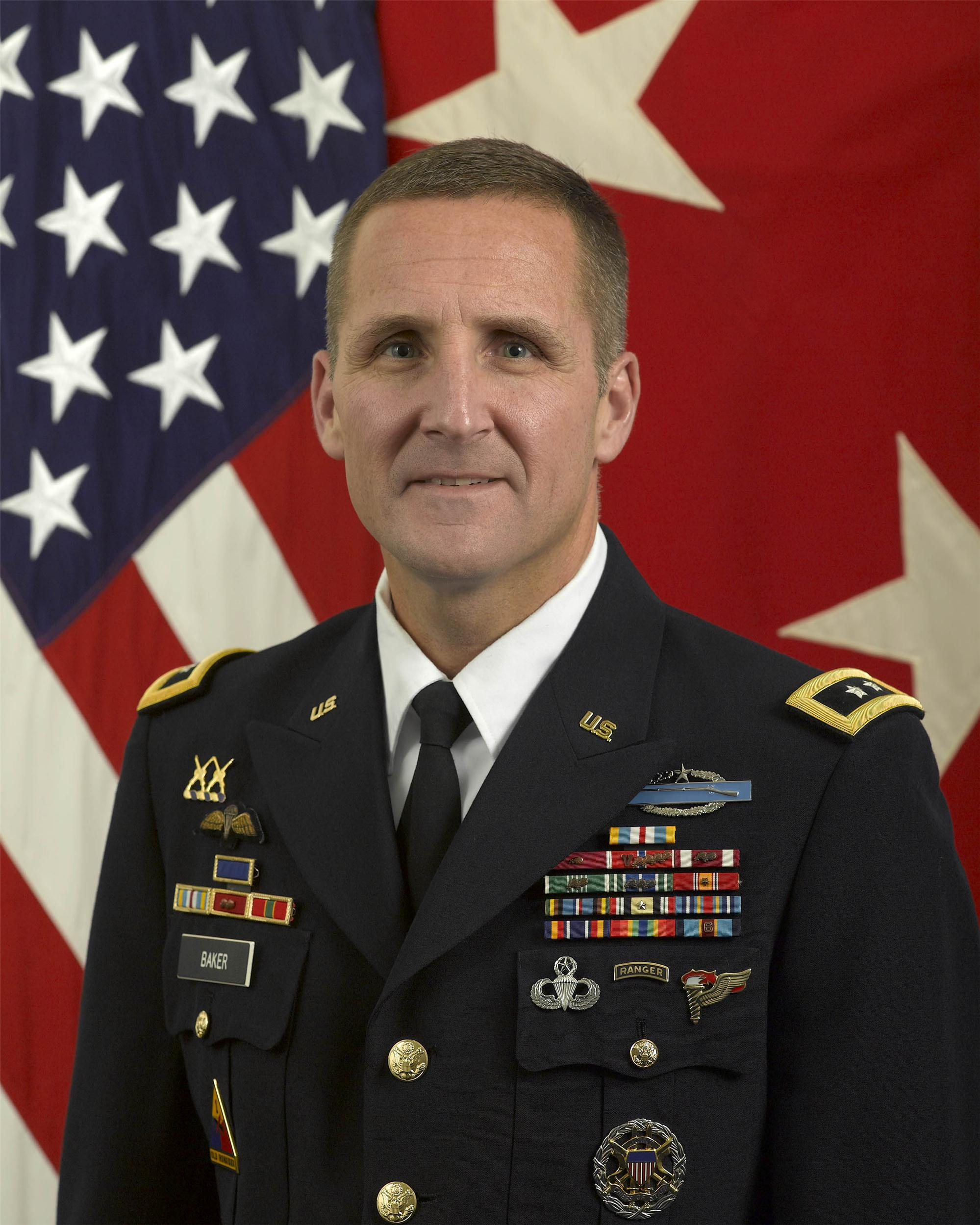
- Baker as a major general and commander of Combined Joint Task Force-Horn of Africa
- Born: March 21, 1960 (age 66); Turkey
- Military career
- Allegiance: United States of America
- Branch: United States Army
- Service years: 1982–2013
- Rank: Major General (Highest rank held); Brigadier General (Rank at retirement)
- Commands: 5th Battalion, 20th Infantry Regiment; 2nd Brigade Combat Team, 1st Armored Division; Combined Joint Task Force-Horn of Africa
- Conflicts: Operation urgent Fury; Iraq War
- Awards: Defense Superior Service Medal; Legion of Merit; Bronze Star Medal
- Other work: Director of Strategic Initiatives, SOS International, LLC; Managing Director, Southern Development Ltd. (SODEVCO)

Ralph Otto "Rob" Baker Jr. (born March 21, 1960) is a retired United States Army Brigadier General who was formerly a major general and commander of Combined Joint Task Force-Horn of Africa.

== Early life ==
Ralph Otto Baker Jr. is a 1978 graduate of Aberdeen High School.

== Education ==
He then attended the United States Military Academy and received a bachelor's degree in 1982. He later earned master's degrees from Central Michigan University and the Naval War College.

== Military education ==
During his Army career, Baker graduated from the Infantry Officer Basic and Advanced Courses, the Combined Arms Services Staff School, and the U.S. Army Command and General Staff College. He also attended the Airborne, Ranger, Pathfinder, Jumpmaster, Bradley Infantry Fighting Vehicle and Joint Firepower Control courses.

== Start of career ==
Baker was commissioned a second lieutenant of infantry after graduating from West Point. His assignments included service with the 82nd Airborne Division during its deployment to Grenada. Among his postings were: 505th Parachute Infantry Regiment; 504th Parachute Infantry Regiment; 3rd Infantry Division (Mechanized); Deputy G3, V Corps, Heidelberg, Germany.

Additional assignments included Tactical Officer at the Royal Military Academy, Sandhurst, United Kingdom; Aide-de-Camp to the commanding general, I Corps and Fort Lewis; and deputy director for Politico-Military Affairs, J-5 – Middle East, Strategic Plans and Policy, on the Joint Staff. Baker participated in 87 parachute jumps.

He commanded 5th Battalion, 20th Infantry Regiment and 2nd Brigade Combat Team, 1st Armored Division.

== Career as a general officer ==
After becoming a brigadier general, Baker served as Deputy Commanding General, United States Division – Center in Iraq during Operation Iraqi Freedom and Operation New Dawn. At the time of his promotion to major general, he was vice director for Joint Force Development (J7) on the Joint Staff at the Pentagon.

After receiving his second star, Baker served as commander of Combined Joint Task Force-Horn of Africa from 2012 until he retired in 2013. Because he did not have enough time in grade as a major general, Baker's retired rank was brigadier general.

He was relieved of his command in March, 2013, following allegations of sexual misconduct. During an investigation, soldiers serving under Baker at Camp Lemonnier said he had a history of heavy drinking. He paid a fine, was demoted to brigadier general, and retired in September, 2013.

== Later career ==
Baker was employed as Director of Strategic Initiatives for SOS International, LLC. He later worked as Managing Director for Southern Development Ltd. (SODEVCO), a company seeking to develop fuel and mineral processing enterprises in countries including Afghanistan.

== Awards ==
Baker's awards include:

- Defense Superior Service Medal
- Legion of Merit
- Bronze Star Medal with three oak leaf clusters and "V" device
- Meritorious Service Medal with two oak leaf clusters
- Army Commendation Medal with three oak leaf clusters
- National Defense Service Medal with one bronze service star
- Armed Forces Expeditionary Medal
- Iraq Campaign Medal
- Global War on Terrorism Expeditionary Medal
- Global War on Terrorism Service Medal
- Ranger tab
- Combat Infantryman Badge (2nd Award)
- Master Parachutist Badge
- British Parachutist Badge
