= Kurt L. Sonntag =

US Army officer (born c. 1964)

Major General Kurt L. Sonntag
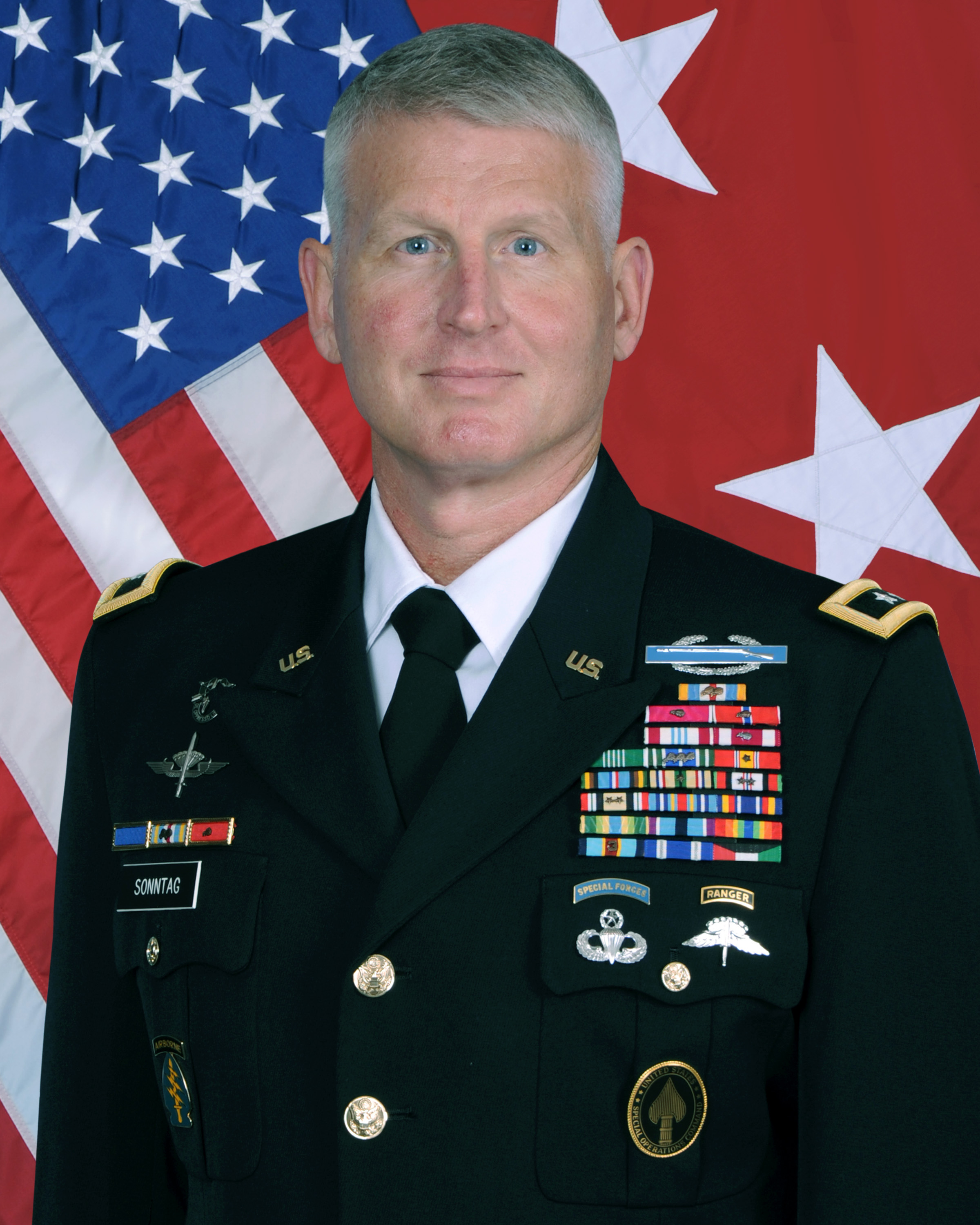
- Major General Kurt L. Sonntag, USA, c. 2017
- Born: July 8, 1964 (age 62); Los Angeles County, California, U.S.
- Education: United States Military Academy (BS); Louisiana State University (MA); Naval War College (MS)
- Military career
- Allegiance: United States of America
- Branch: United States Army
- Service years: 1986–2019
- Rank: Major General
- Commands: SWCS; Combined Joint Task Force-Horn of Africa; Special Operations Command South; 2nd Battalion, 1st Special Warfare Training Group (Airborne)
- Awards: Defense Superior Service Medal (3); Legion of Merit (2); Bronze Star (2); Defense Meritorious Service Medal; Meritorious Service Medal (6); Army Commendation Medal; Army Achievement Medal (4)

Major General Kurt Lee Sonntag (born July 8, 1964) is a retired United States Army special forces officer who last served as Commanding General of the John F. Kennedy Special Warfare Center and School from May 2017 to August 2019. Before that, he served as Commander, Combined Joint Task Force-Horn of Africa in support of Operation Enduring Freedom.

== Early life and education ==
Born in Los Angeles County, California, Sonntag graduated from Glendora High School in 1982. He is a 1986 graduate of the United States Military Academy at West Point, New York. Sonntag holds a Master of Arts in Military History from Louisiana State University and a Master of Science in National Security Strategy Studies from the Naval War College.

== Military career ==
Sonntag began his military career as an Infantry officer in 1986. While in the Infantry, Sonntag served as a Bradley platoon leader, scout platoon leader and aviation operations officer with the 2nd Armored Division.

After attending the Infantry Officer Advanced Course and the Special Forces Qualification Course in 1991, Sonntag served as a detachment commander, battalion logistics officer, support company commander and company commander in 3rd Battalion, 5th Special Forces Group (Airborne) at Fort Campbell, Kentucky.

After leaving the 5th Special Forces Group in 1997, Sonntag served as a company and battalion observer/controller with the Special Operations Training Detachment at the Joint Readiness Training Center, Fort Polk, Louisiana. Upon completion of the Naval Command and Staff College at the Naval War College in Newport, Rhode Island, in 2000, he returned to the 5th SFG(A) to command another company, serve as a battalion's executive officer during Operation Enduring Freedom-Afghanistan, and as the 5th SFG (A) executive officer. Sonntag also served as the Combined Joint Special Operations Task Force-West and Arabian Peninsula's Chief of Staff during Operation Iraqi Freedom.

Following a brief assignment as Chief of the Joint and Army Concepts Division, Army Special Operations Battle Lab, Sonntag commanded 2nd Battalion, 1st Special Warfare Training Group (Airborne) and later served as the operations officer for the United States Army Special Forces Command (Airborne).

After fulfilling his United States Army War College requirements in 2009, Sonntag deployed to Pakistan to serve as the Special Operations Command Central (Forward)–Pakistan commander in support of Operation Enduring Freedom, with a follow-on assignment as Chief of Staff, USASOC, and later Deputy Commanding General, USASOC. He then served as the Commander, Special Operations Command South, U.S. Southern Command. After that, he served as Commander, Combined Joint Task Force-Horn of Africa in support of Operation Enduring Freedom.

In his final assignment, he served as Commanding General of the John F. Kennedy Special Warfare Center and School (SWCS) from May 2017 to August 2019. His final 2 years at SWCS were littered with some degree of controversy, including the publication of an open letter by an upset SWCS instructor accusing senior officers at the school of lowering standards at SWCS specifically during the Special Forces Qualification Course (SFQC) to inflate the number of soldiers entering into the US Army Special Forces. The letter, termed the "Night Letter" or "Sonntag Letter," angered the General and a number SWCS instructors saw their careers ended as result.

== Post-military career ==
Sonntag is currently serving as the president of the Patriot Foundation, a foundation that provides support for the children of military service men and women who are killed, wounded, injured, or who become seriously ill while serving in the United States Armed Forces.
