= Betty Cooper Hearnes =

American politician (1927–2023)

Betty Hearnes
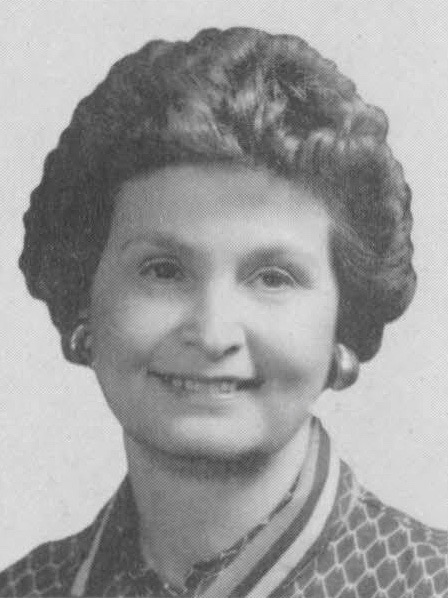

Member of the Missouri House of Representatives from the 160th district
- In office January 1979 – January 1989
- Preceded by: Fred DeField
- Succeeded by: Ollie Amick

First Lady of Missouri
- In role January 11, 1965 – January 8, 1973
- Governor: Warren Hearnes
- Preceded by: Geraldine Dalton
- Succeeded by: Carolyn Reid

Personal details
- Born: Betty Sue Cooper; July 24, 1927 Brinkley, Arkansas, U.S.
- Died: December 14, 2023 (aged 96) Charleston, Missouri, U.S.
- Party: Democratic
- Spouse: Warren Hearnes (m. 1948; died 2009)
- Education: Southeast Missouri State University (attended); Central Baptist College (attended); Baylor University (attended); University of Missouri (BS)

Betty Sue Hearnes (née Cooper; July 24, 1927 – December 14, 2023) was an American Democratic Party politician from Missouri.

On July 2, 1948, she married Warren E. Hearnes, a recent West Point graduate, while he was on leave from the United States Army. She was his partner throughout his career, including his two terms as Governor of Missouri and the federal investigations of his conduct by the Nixon White House, until his death in August 2009.

Hearnes was elected to the Missouri House of Representatives from Charleston in 1979, in a special election. She was re-elected in 1980, 1982, 1984, and 1986.

In 1988 she was the Democratic nominee for governor and lost to John Ashcroft. Ashcroft received 64 percent of the vote in the general election—the largest landslide for Missouri governor since the Civil War. She lost bids to return to the state house in 1990, the Missouri State Senate in 1992 and the state house in 1998.

In 2005, both Warren and Betty Hearnes were awarded the Edwin P. Hubble Medal of Initiative during the Charleston Dogwood-Azalea Festival. The medal was presented by a delegation of citizens from Marshfield, Missouri. The medal is the city of Marshfield's highest honor and is named for a native son.

Hearnes died in Charleston, Missouri, on December 14, 2023, at the age of 96.

Honorary titles
Preceded by Geraldine Dalton	First Lady of Missouri; 1965–1973	Succeeded by Carolyn Reid
Party political offices
Preceded by Ken Rothman	Democratic nominee for Governor of Missouri; 1988	Succeeded by Mel Carnahan
