= Timothy F. Ghormley =

United States Marine Corps general

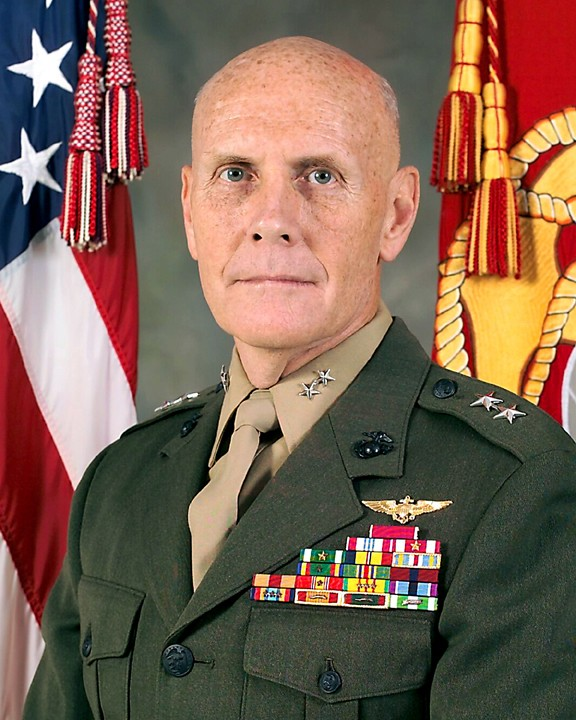
- Timothy F. Ghormley
- Military career
- Allegiance: United States of America
- Branch: United States Marine Corps
- Service years: 1967–2008
- Rank: Major General
- Conflicts: Vietnam War, Operation Enduring Freedom
- Awards: Legion of Merit, Légion d'honneur

Major General Timothy F. Ghormley is an American officer in the United States Marine Corps who served in the Vietnam War, as Inspector General of the Marine Corps, as commander of the Combined Joint Task Force – Horn of Africa and as the Chief of Staff for US Central Command. Major General Ghormley retired from the military in 2008.

Ghormley has endorsed the false conspiracy theory that the 2020 presidential election was rigged to favor Joe Biden and claims that the United States "has taken a hard left turn toward Socialism and a Marxist form of tyrannical government."

== Military career ==
Ghormley joined the Marine Corps in April 1967 and served in California with the 1st Force Troops, 1st Redeye Platoon at Marine Corps Base, Twentynine Palms. He was transferred to South Vietnam in 1969 to serve with the 2nd Battalion, 4th Marines. After having been discharged from active service in 1970, Ghormley joined the Platoon Leaders Course Program and received a bachelor's degree from university as well as a commission to second lieutenant in 1973.

Ghormley received flight training and was assigned to Lake Forest, California and the USS Midway until he was recalled for a year amphibious training in June 1980. Returning to Lake Forest in 1981, Ghormley spent the next four years there, before attending the Marine Corps Command & Staff College in 1985, and transferring across to F/A-18 Hornets in 1986. 1988 saw Ghormley serving as executive officer to a number of squadrons across California until attending the Naval War College, in Newport, Rhode Island in 1991.

In 1992 Ghormley was transferred to Hawaii to take command of another squadron, and then in 1994 became duty officer for USCINCPAC. From July 1996 until 1998 Ghormley held a series of commands before being promoted to brigadier general in 1999, taking a new position as Assistant Deputy Chief of Staff for Manpower and Reserve Affairs on 14 June 1999. In September 1999 Ghormley took the role of Inspector General of the Marine Corps in Washington DC.

In July 2001, Ghormley took command of the Marine Expeditionary Brigade based in Okinawa in Japan, as well as the Expeditionary Strike Group of the U.S. Seventh Fleet. In 2003 he became the Director of Manpower Plans & Policy Division of the Marine Corps, and between May 2005 and February 2006, Ghormley commanded the Combined Joint Task Force Horn of Africa.

Ghormley arrived at US Central Command in July 2006 and became the Chief of Staff on 27 October 2006. As of 14 September 1999 Ghormley had logged 4300 hours of flight time, with 2000 of these in the F/RF-4B Phantom, 1700 hours in the F/A-18 Hornet and 300 hours in other aircraft.

=== Awards ===

Naval Aviator Badge
1st Row		Legion of Merit		
2nd Row	Defense Meritorious Service Medal	Meritorious Service Medal w/ 1 award star	Navy and Marine Corps Commendation Medal w/ 1 award star	Combat Action Ribbon
3rd Row	Joint Meritorious Unit Award	Navy Unit Commendation w/ 1 service star	Navy Meritorious Unit Commendation	Marine Corps Good Conduct Medal
4th Row	Marine Corps Expeditionary Medal	National Defense Service Medal w/ 1 service star	Vietnam Service Medal w/ 3 service stars	Humanitarian Service Medal
5th Row	Navy Sea Service Deployment Ribbon w/ 3 stars	Vietnam Gallantry Cross unit citation	Vietnam Civil Actions unit citation	Vietnam Campaign Medal
