= 1988 Missouri gubernatorial election =

- November 8, 1988
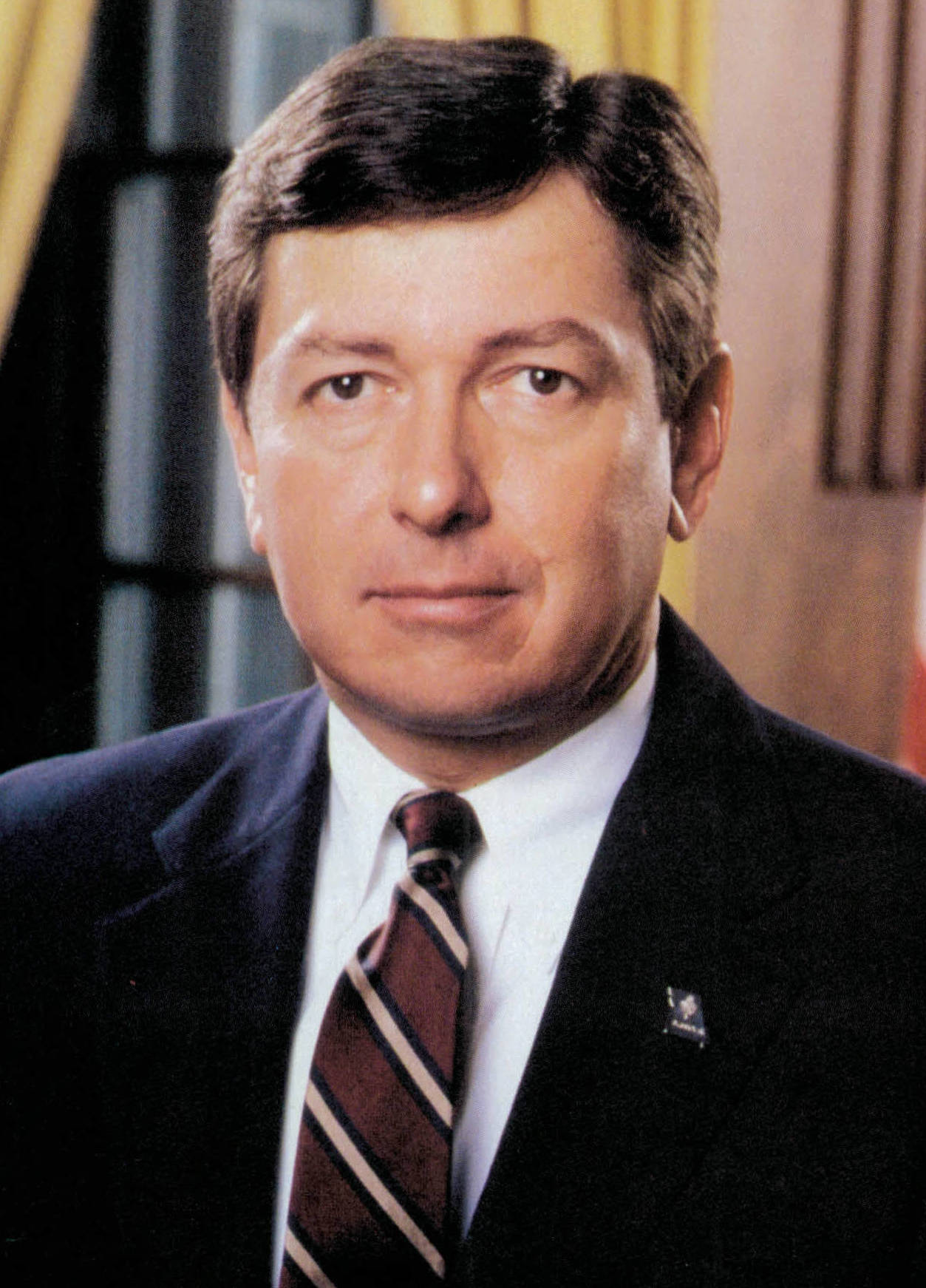

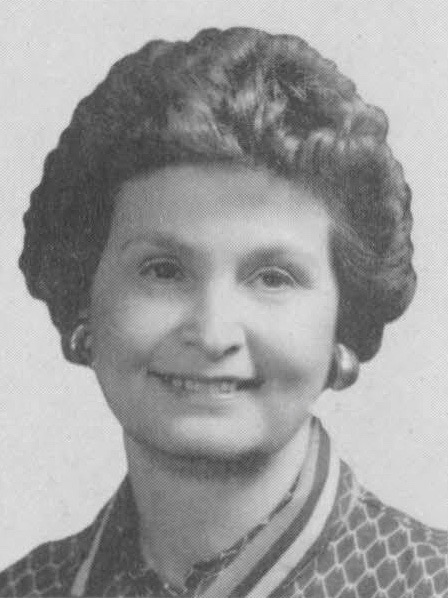
Nominee	John Ashcroft	Betty Hearnes
Party	Republican	Democratic
Popular vote	1,339,531	724,919
Percentage	64.22%	34.75%
- County results Ashcroft: 50–60% 60–70% 70–80% Hearnes: 50–60% 60–70%
Governor before election
John Ashcroft
Republican
Elected Governor
John Ashcroft
Republican

The 1988 Missouri gubernatorial election was held on November 8, 1988, and resulted in a victory for the Republican nominee, incumbent Governor John Ashcroft, over the Democratic candidate, State Representative Betty Cooper Hearnes, and Libertarian Mike Roberts.

Betty Hearnes was married to Warren E. Hearnes, who had served as governor from 1965 to 1973. This election was the first time that an incumbent Republican Governor of Missouri was re-elected to a second consecutive term, the most recent being 2020. As of 2024, this is the last time Boone, Jackson, and St. Louis Counties voted Republican in a gubernatorial election.

== Results ==
1988 gubernatorial election, Missouri
Party	Candidate	Votes	%	±%
Republican	John Ashcroft (incumbent)	1,339,531	64.22	+7.58
Democratic	Betty Cooper Hearnes	724,919	34.75	−8.59
Libertarian	Mike Roberts	21,467	1.03	+1.03
Majority		614,612	29.46	+16.14
Turnout		2,085,917	42.43	−0.45
Republican hold		Swing		
