= Combined Joint Task Force – Horn of Africa =

US military force in Africa

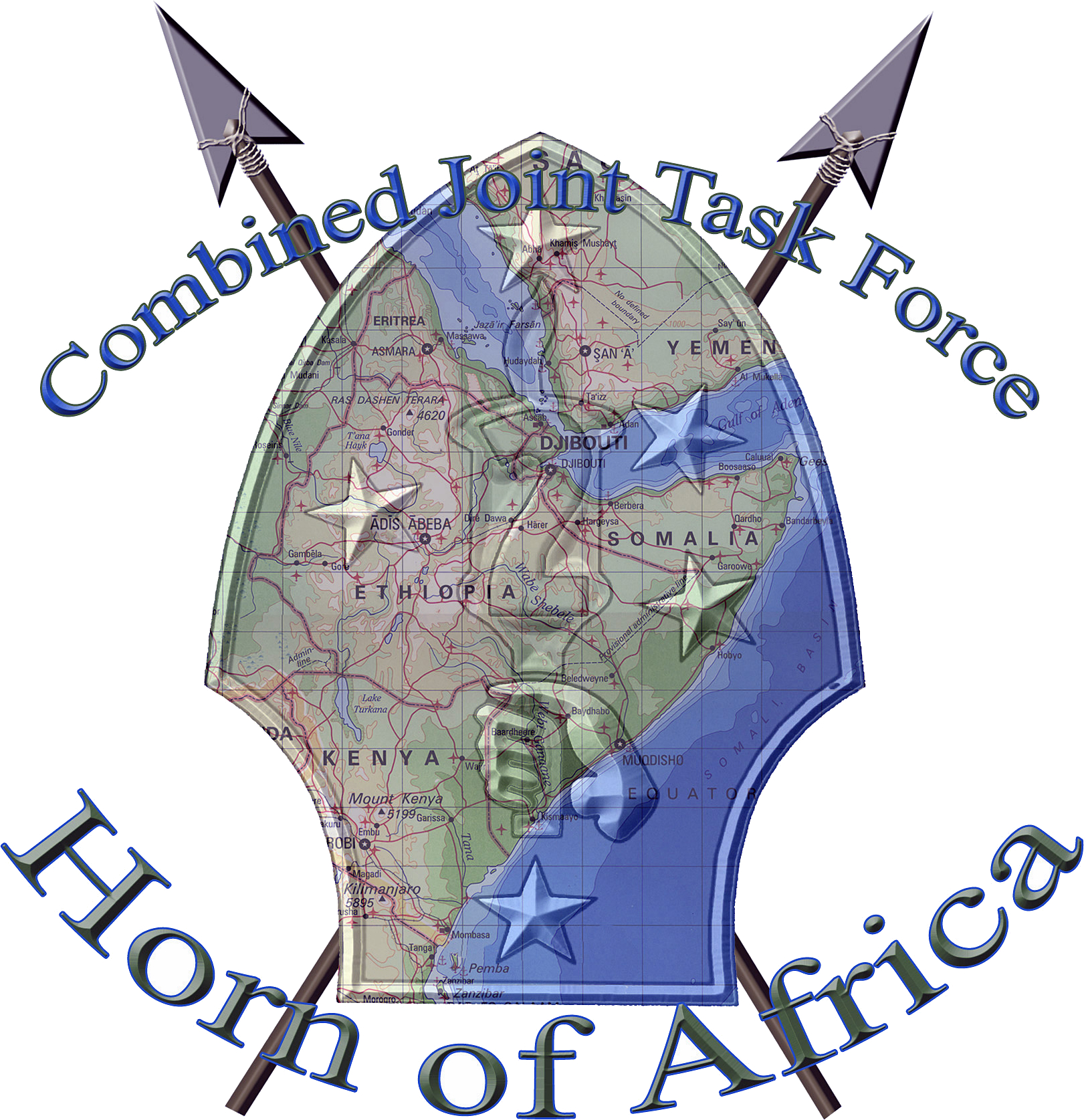
- Active: October 19, 2002–present
- Country: United States
- Type: Multiservice (joint) formation
- Role: Military operations and civil and military capacity building
- Size: 2,000
- Part of: United States Africa Command
- Garrison/HQ: Camp Lemonnier, Republic of Djibouti

Commanders
- Commanding General: Brigadier General Matthew W. Brown
- Deputy Commanding Officer: Brigadier General Andrew W. Ballenger

Combined Joint Task Force – Horn of Africa (CJTF-HOA) is a joint task force of United States Africa Command (AFRICOM). The U.S. war on terror begun after the September 11 terrorist attacks in 2001. In October 2002, headquarters elements of the Marine Corps was sent to establish the Task Force in Djibouti. It was initially directly responsible to United States Central Command at MacDill Air Force Base, in Tampa, Florida.

The task force mission is to conduct operations within its Combined Joint Operations Area to enhance partner nation capacity, promote regional security and stability, dissuade conflict, and protect U.S. interests. It has become extensively involved in the Somali Civil War.

CJTF-HOA consists of about 2,000 servicemen and women from the United States Department of Defense. In 2012, the task force had an assigned area of interest that included Sudan, Somalia, Djibouti, Ethiopia, Eritrea, Seychelles and Kenya. Outside this area, the task force had operations in Mauritius, Comoros, Liberia, Rwanda, Uganda and Tanzania. In mid-2007, "although CJTF-HOA's C is supposed to signify a "combined" effort involving [other] states, only a dozen or so officers [were] actually drawn—as liaisons—from ten militaries (five local, five distant) other" than the United States.

From Fiscal Year 2020 the term "Operation Enduring Freedom - Horn of Africa" has been used in United States federal budget Overseas Contingency Operations supplemental funding documents to designate funds spent on Camp Lemonnier and CJTF-HOA. Budget documentation from earlier years (eg FY 2007) details funding requested for Camp Lemonnier within the overall emergency supplemental request, without a separate designation for Djibouti.

== History ==
After the Fall of Kabul in November 2001, there was considerable U.S. Department of Defense concern that Islamist takfiri, jihadis, and others fleeing from Afghanistan might escape south and west to the Arabian Peninsula and East Africa. U.S. Central Command already had responsibility for Yemen. But there were concerns that takfiri militants might escape across the Arabian Sea to East Africa.

In August 2002, Marines from the 22nd Marine Expeditionary Unit (Special Operations Capable (MEU) (SOC)) carried out a long-range deployment exercise from the amphibious assault ship USS Wasp into Djibouti. During the deployment the MEU also participated in Operation Sea Eagle in the Gulf of Aden and Operation Infinite Anvil in the Horn of Africa.

The task force was established at Camp Lejeune, North Carolina on October 19, 2002, drawing upon element of headquarters 2nd Marine Division and II Marine Expeditionary Force. The commander of 2nd Marine Division, Major-General John F. Sattler, commanded the task force. In November 2002, the amphibious command ship USS Mount Whitney (LCC-20) began its voyage to the region, and arrived on December 8, 2002. The initial mission of the task force was to "detect, disorganize, defeat, and deny" terrorist groups. Both Somalia and Yemen were within the initial task force area of responsibility.

In November 2002, a Central Intelligence Agency-controlled Predator drone fired a Hellfire missile at a vehicle in the Yemeni desert containing Qaed Salim Sinan al-Harethi, a Yemeni suspected senior al-Qaeda lieutenant. al-Harethi was believed to have been the mastermind behind the October 2000 USS Cole bombing that had killed 17 Americans. He was on a list of targets whose capture or death had been called for by President George W. Bush. In addition to al-Harethi, five other occupants of the vehicle were killed, all of whom were suspected al-Qaeda members, and one of whom (Kamal Derwish) was an American. The attack was reported to have taken place with the cooperation and approval of the government of Yemen.

On December 12, 2002, Secretary of Defence Donald Rumsfeld visited Camp Lemonnier. The same day, a US Army spokesman at Camp Lemonnier was asked if any missions had been launched from the new base. The reply was "None that are conventional enough that we can speak about." Scahill writes that "JSOC's role in Somalia during the early years after 9/11 was relegated to in-country protection for the CIA, establishing surveillance equipment on the ground, and having a team on standby in Djibouti, ready to swoop in if anything went wrong with the small CIA-led teams running the warlords." The Alliance for the Restoration of Peace and Counter-Terrorism, made up of Somali warlords, was being used to carry out "targeted kill and capture operations." Prominent among the Somali strongmen used was Mohamed Qanyare Afrah.

CJTF-HOA operated from Mount Whitney until May 13, 2003, when the mission moved ashore to Camp Lemonnier in Djibouti City, Djibouti. Barnett wrote in 2007 that:

"But other than [the November 2002 strike in Yemen], the great rush of rats fleeing the sinking ship [had] not yet materialized.. Uncomfortable just sitting around, the Marines quickly refashioned the task force with the blessing of General John Abizaid, then head of Central Command, who envisioned Combined Joint Task Force-Horn of Africa (CJTF-HOA) as a sort of strategic inoculant. If the Marines weren't going to get to kill anybody, then they'd train the locals to do it instead. But CJTF-HOA, ..soon evolved into something so much more: an experiment in combining defense, diplomacy, and development -- the so-called three-D approach so clearly lacking in [United States] recent postwar reconstruction efforts elsewhere."

In November 2003, Joint Special Operations Task Force - Horn of Africa was a component of CJTF-HOA. It was headed by Colonel Rod Turner. At the time, Turner's JSOTF-HOA, of 350-400 personnel, was "by far the largest operational component" of CJTF-HOA. Turner's task force ran SEAL Delivery Vehicle missions emplacing stationary cameras along the coast of Somalia, in order to fill in the gaps of almost unavailable overhead imagery collection. In contrast to Afghanistan and Iraq, bases that could used for U.S. aerial surveillance were much fewer, and the distances were long. Turner also headed the CENTCOM Crisis Response Element.

In April 2004, General John Abizaid, commanding Central Command, said in a DOD press briefing that "there are also about 1,200 of our troops serving in the Horn of Africa, where they've performed duties stationed in Djibouti, but working throughout the Horn of Africa to help regional nations increase their counterterrorist capacity, to share intelligence with them, to gain intelligence on terrorist operations out there."

The task force originally focused on two poles: gathering intelligence and creating goodwill through public works projects.

In January 2004, Brigadier General Mastin Robison of the United States Marine Corps, then commanding the Task Force, had support, medical, and admin staff from the Marines, Navy, Army, and Air Force, a Marine helicopter detachment of four CH-53 Super Stallions, a U.S. Army infantry company, a U.S. Army Reserve civil affairs company, Navy cargo planes, military engineers, and a special operations unit under his command.

On 6 May 2005, a party of Marines reportedly landed in Somaliland, the autonomous and self-declared state in northern Somalia. The Marines reportedly handed out photos to locals of possible terrorist suspects. Three ships, including a helicopter carrier, were reported in a nearby anchorage, likely a passing Marine Expeditionary Unit/Amphibious Ready Group (MEU/ARG). Major General Samuel T. Helland, Commander, CJTF-HOA, denied that there was a landing, and said operations were not being conducted in Somaliland.

In January 2006, ahead of Rear-Admiral Hunt assuming command, Deputy Assistant Secretary of Defense for African Affairs, Therese Whelan, said she anticipated that under Rear-Admiral Hunt's command, the task force would "concentrate on strengthening maritime security" in the sea lanes along the Red Sea and Gulf of Aden. At the time, the task force had some responsibility for Yemen, as depicted in a Virginian-Pilot online map.

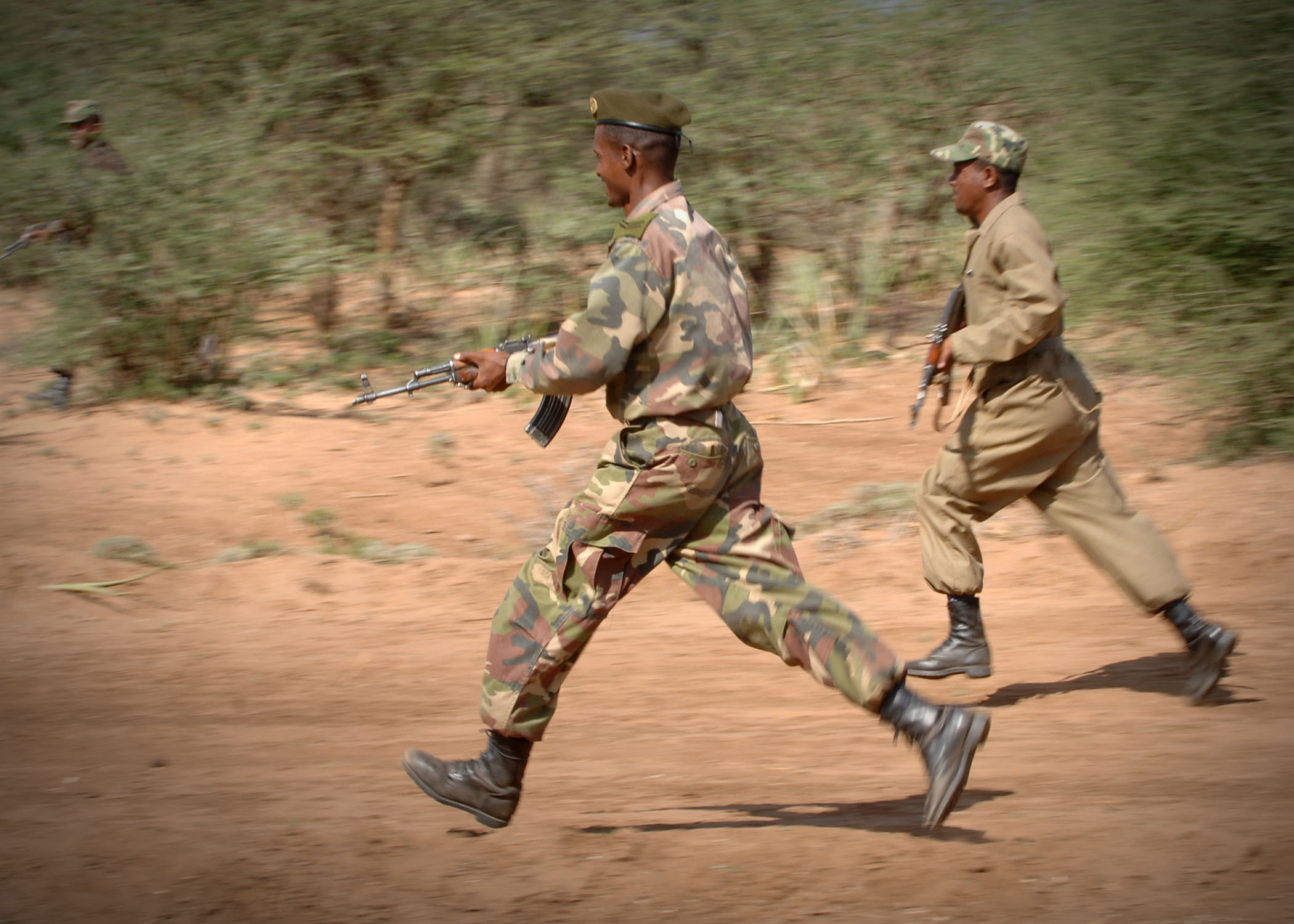
Ethiopian soldiers practice ambush techniques during CJTF-HOA training in December 2006.

Members of the Task Force have provided humanitarian assistance. This has included recovery efforts after the collapse of a four-story building in Kenya in 2006, the capsizing of a passenger ferry in Djibouti in 2006, and floods in Ethiopia and Kenya in 2006. Task Force personnel assisted the Government of Uganda in locating and recovering the wreckage of a Russian-built Ilyushin Il-76 transport plane that crashed into Lake Victoria in early 2009.

CJTF-HOA's activities developed into "military-to-military engagements; civil-military operations; key leader engagements; and "enabling support". CJTF-HOA has drilled and refurbished more than 113 water wells; built functional schools, and improved roadways and medical facilities. Long-term goals include working with African and other states to improve national and regional stability and security. The task force ran Civil affairs and military-to-military training; engineering and humanitarian projects; medical, dental, and veterinarian civic action programs (MEDCAP, DENTCAP, VETCAP); security training for border and coastal areas; and Counter-IED efforts training. It has trained in collaboration with many of the armed forces around the Horn of Africa. About 1,800 personnel from each military branch of the Department of Defense (United States), and civilian employees ..[made] up CJTF-HOA" in August 2007.

On October 1, 2008, responsibility for the task force was transferred from the United States Central Command to the United States Africa Command (USAFRICOM), as the latter assumed authority over the U.S. forces in the region.

In September 2009, Joint Special Operations Command carried out a raid on Baraawe, Lower Shabelle, named Operation Celestial Balance. They killed Saleh Ali Saleh Nabhan, as well as five other militants. Also in 2009, British Army soldiers from the Special Air Service and the Special Reconnaissance Regiment were deployed to Djibouti as part of CJTF-HOA to conduct operations against Islamist terrorists in Somalia. They carried out surveillance and targeting of terrorists, alongside their US counterparts, in both Somalia and Yemen.

The majority of the new task force core staff for Rear-Admiral Brian L. Losey's tour officially began work February 4, 2010. Made up mostly of Navy Individual Augmentees and two Army members, the 59 new core staff members filled the positions of commander, deputy commander, chief of staff, command element commanders and other key positions, including those in remote operating bases in East Africa.

The drones at Camp Lemonnier flew missions as part of three named operations:

- Copper Dune - counter-terrorism operations in Yemen, including the December 2009 United States attacks in Yemen;
- Jupiter Garret - counter-terrorism operations in Somalia;
- Octave Shield - CJTF-HOA activities

== Commanders ==
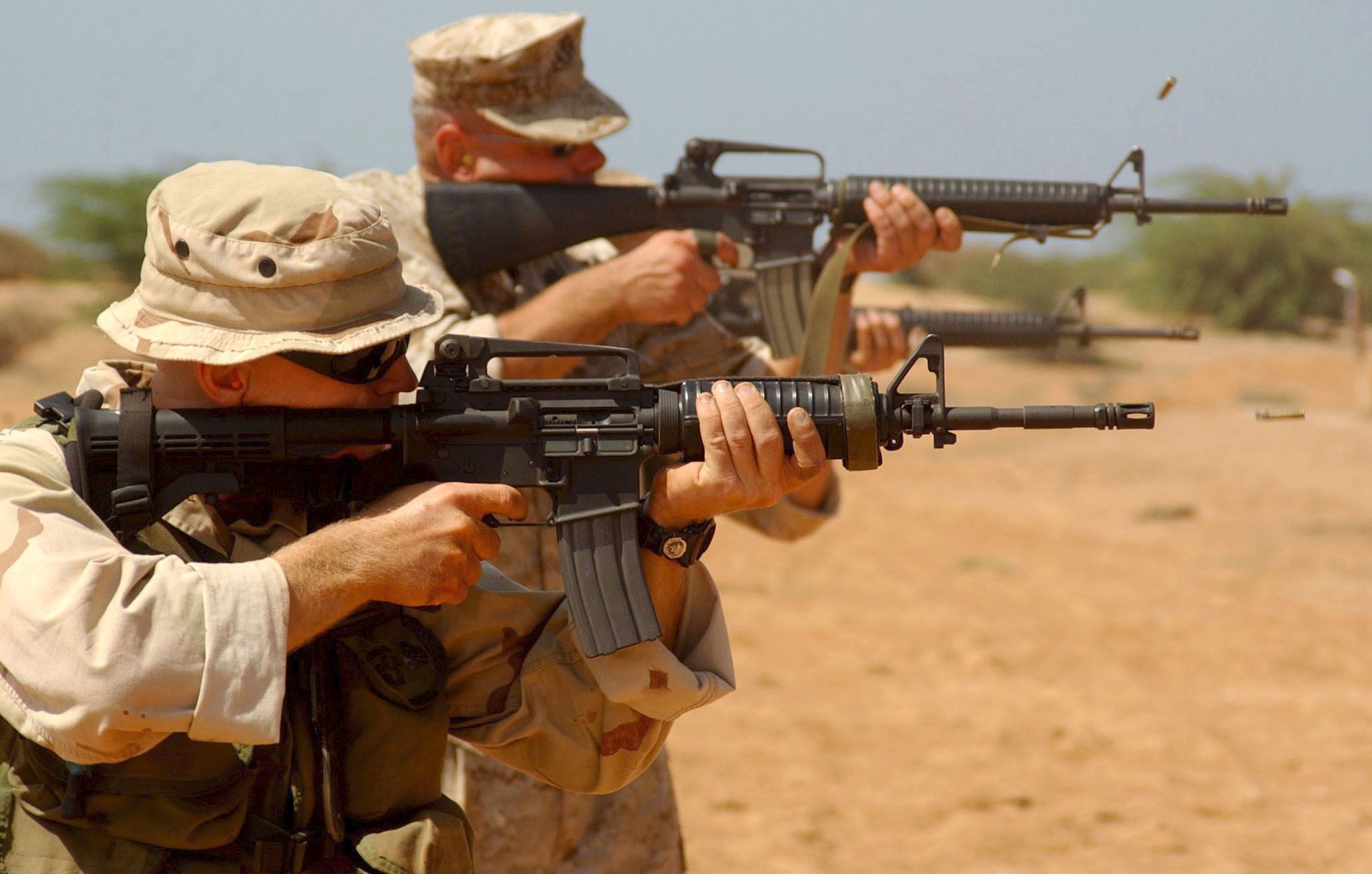
Live-fire exercise for marksmanship and weapons handling in March 2003, part of the CJTF-HOA.

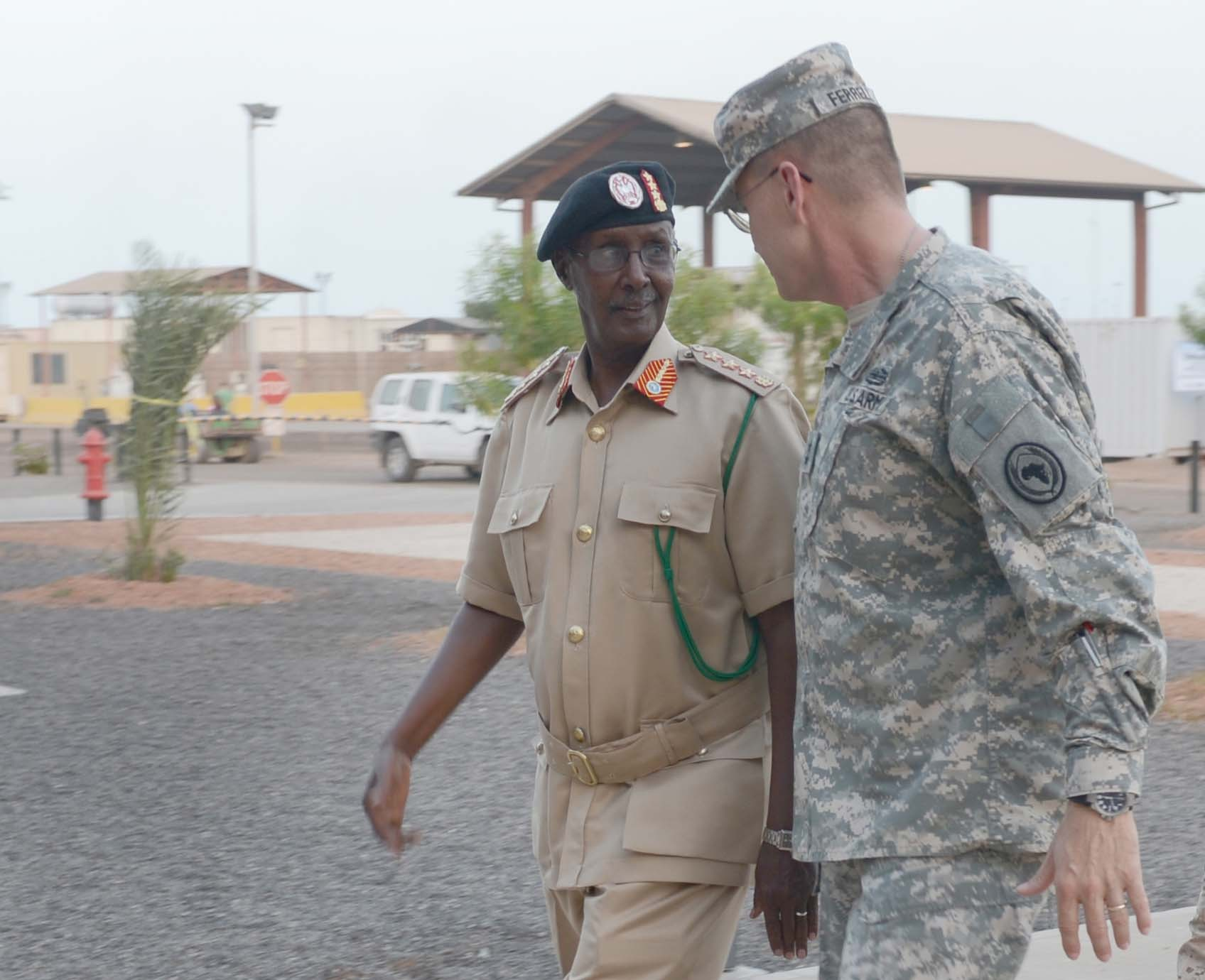
Maj. Gen. Terry Ferrell, Commander of the Combined Joint Task Force-Horn of Africa, and Gen. Dahir Adan Elmi, Chief of Defense for the Somali Armed Forces, walk together into the galley at Camp Lemonnier, Djibouti (May 2013).

- November 2002 to August 2003 – United States Marine Corps Major General John F. Sattler (task force headquarters, initially aboard Mount Whitney)
- May 2004 to May 2005 - United States Marine Corps Major General Samuel T. Helland
- May 17, 2005 to April 12, 2006 – United States Marine Corps Major General Timothy F. Ghormley
- April 12, 2006 to February 14, 2007 – United States Navy Rear Admiral Richard W. Hunt (at least some headquarters elements drawn from Commander, Carrier Strike Group 6)
- February 14, 2007 to February 3, 2008 – United States Navy Rear Admiral James M. Hart
- February 8, 2008 to February 5, 2009 – United States Navy Rear Admiral Philip H. Greene, Jr.
- February 5, 2009 to March 27, 2010 – United States Navy Rear Admiral Anthony Kurta
- March 27, 2010 to May 19, 2011 – United States Navy Rear Admiral Brian L. Losey
- May 11, 2011 to May 26, 2012 – United States Navy Rear Admiral Michael T. Franken
- May 26, 2012 to March 28, 2013 – United States Army Major General Ralph O. Baker Baker was relieved of his command due to alcohol and sexual misconduct charges by General Carter Ham, the outgoing commander of U.S. Africa Command
- March 2013 to January 2014 - United States Army Major General Terry Ferrell
- January 2014 - April 2015 - United States Army Major General Wayne Grigsby, Junior
- April 2015 - April 2016 - United States Army Major General Mark R. Stammer
- April 2016 - April 2017 - United States Army Major General Kurt L. Sonntag
- April 2017 - May 2018 - United States Marine Corps Brigadier General David J. Furness
- May 2018 - June 2018 - United States Army Brigadier General William L. Zana
- June 2018 - June 2019 - United States Army Major General James D. Craig
- June 2019 - June 2020 - United States Army Major General Michael D. Turello
- June 2020 - May 2021 - United States Army Major General Lapthe C. Flora
- May 2021 – May 2022 - United States Army Major General William L. Zana
- May 2022 – April 2024 - United States Army Major General Jami C. Shawley
- April 2024 – Present - United States Army Major General Brian T. Cashman

== Deaths on active service ==
28 U.S. servicemen have been killed in non-hostile incidents in Djibouti since the start of operations in the Horn of Africa.

Four U.S. soldiers were killed in accidents in Kenya.

Two U.S. soldiers were killed in a vehicle accident in Ethiopia.

Two U.S. servicemen were killed in the Republic of Seychelles and in the Gulf of Oman, respectively.

== Awards ==

Award streamer	Award	Dates	Notes
	Joint Meritorious Unit Award	1 Oct 02 – 31 Mar 04	HQ Combined JTF-Horn of Africa (CENTCOM)
	Joint Meritorious Unit Award	1 Apr 04 – 31 Mar 06	Combined JTF-Horn of Africa (CENTCOM)
	Joint Meritorious Unit Award	1 Apr 06 – 31 Mar 08	Combined JTF-Horn of Africa (CENTCOM)
	Joint Meritorious Unit Award	1 Apr 08 – 31 Mar 10	Joint Task Force-Horn of Africa (AFRICOM)
	Joint Meritorious Unit Award	1 Apr 10 – 31 Mar 12	Joint Task Force-Horn of Africa (AFRICOM)
	Joint Meritorious Unit Award	1 Apr 12 – 31 Mar 14	Joint Task Force-Horn of Africa (AFRICOM)
	Joint Meritorious Unit Award	1 Apr 14 – 31 Mar 17	Combined Joint Task Force-Horn of Africa (AFRICOM)
	Joint Meritorious Unit Award	1 Apr 17 – 30 Sep 18	Combined Joint Task Force-Horn of Africa (AFRICOM)
	Joint Meritorious Unit Award	13 Nov 20 – 16 Jan 21	Combined Joint Task Force-Horn of Africa (AFRICOM)

== See also ==
- Al-Qaeda insurgency in Yemen
- Operation Enduring Freedom – Horn of Africa - seemingly a budget designation for CJTF-HOA activities.
- Naval operations off the coast of Somalia are ultimately directed by United States Naval Forces Central Command/Fifth Fleet.
- American military intervention in Somalia (2007–present). Special operations and security forces assistance in Somalia are handled by United States Security Assistance Organizations; the Defense Attache Office; and United States Special Operations Command Africa.
- December 2009 United States attacks in Yemen, which included Operation "Copper Dune"
