= 1988 Missouri State Treasurer election =

- November 8, 1988
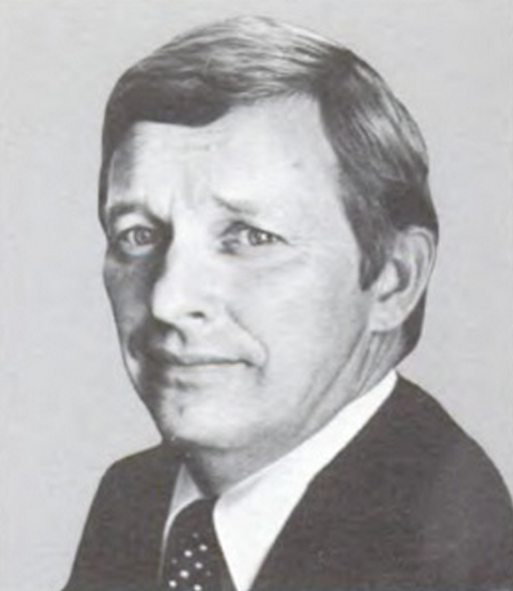

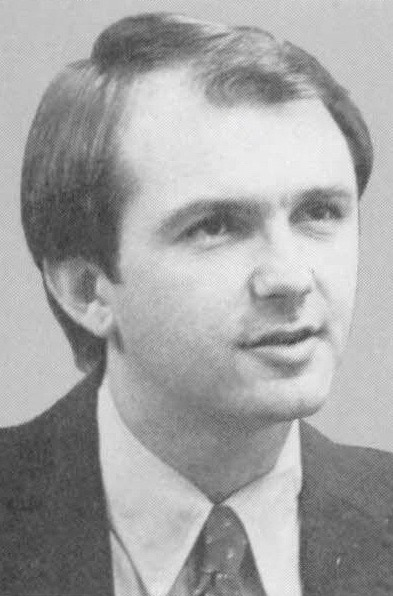
Nominee	Wendell Bailey	Bob Holden
Party	Republican	Democratic
Popular vote	1,024,009	981,919
Percentage	50.56%	48.48%
State Treasurer before election
Wendell Bailey
Republican
Elected State Treasurer
Wendell Bailey
Republican

The 1988 Missouri State Treasurer election was held on November 8, 1988, in order to elect the state treasurer of Missouri. Republican nominee and incumbent state treasurer Wendell Bailey defeated Democratic nominee and incumbent member of the Missouri House of Representatives Bob Holden and Libertarian nominee Gerald R. Geier.

== General election ==
On election day, November 8, 1988, Republican nominee Wendell Bailey won re-election by a margin of 42,090 votes against his foremost opponent Democratic nominee Bob Holden, thereby retaining Republican control over the office of state treasurer. Bailey was sworn in for his second term on January 9, 1989.

=== Results ===
Missouri State Treasurer election, 1988
Party	Candidate	Votes	%
Republican	Wendell Bailey (incumbent)	1,024,009	50.56
Democratic	Bob Holden	981,919	48.48
Libertarian	Gerald R. Geier	19,443	0.96
Total votes		2,007,872	100.00
Republican hold			

== See also ==
- 1988 Missouri gubernatorial election
