= 1992 Missouri State Treasurer election =

- November 3, 1992
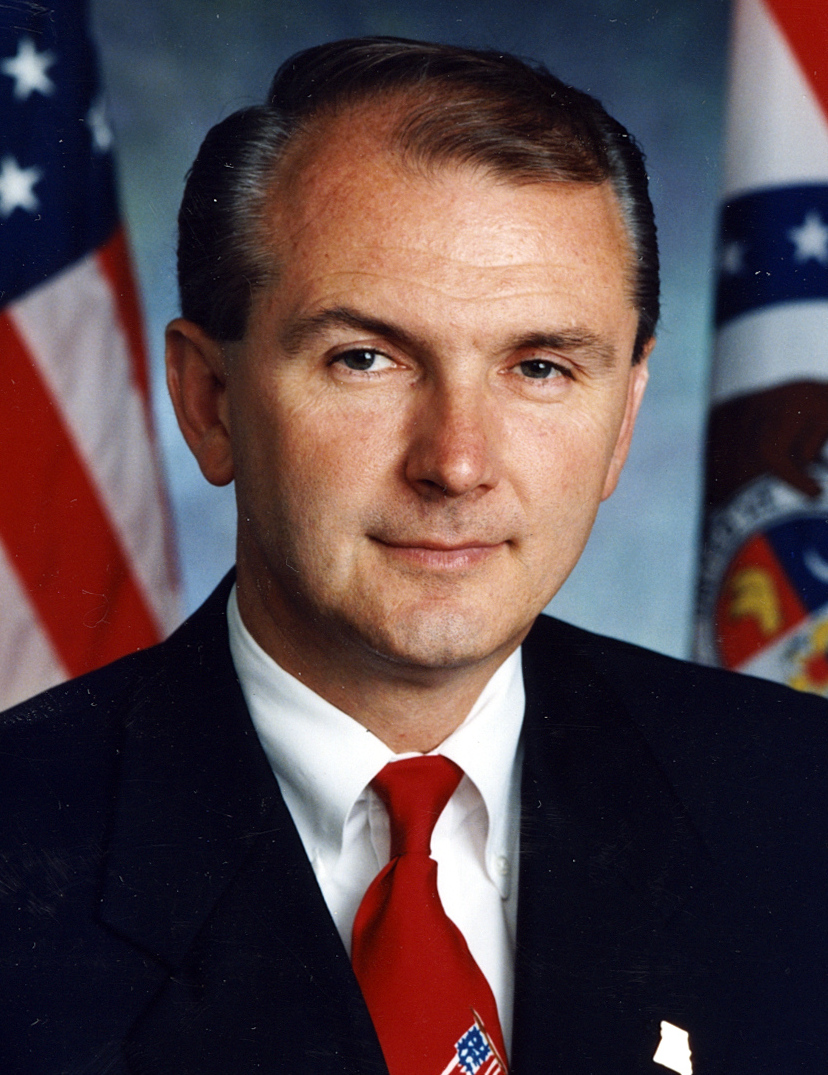

Nominee	Bob Holden	Gary Melton	Janet Lewis
Party	Democratic	Republican	Libertarian
Popular vote	1,285,890	847,235	140,968
Percentage	56.55%	37.25%	6.20%
State Treasurer before election
Wendell Bailey
Republican
Elected State Treasurer
Bob Holden
Democratic

The 1992 Missouri State Treasurer election was held on November 3, 1992, in order to elect the state treasurer of Missouri. Democratic nominee and former member of the Missouri House of Representatives Bob Holden defeated Republican nominee Gary Melton and Libertarian nominee Janet Lewis.

== General election ==
On election day, November 3, 1992, Democratic nominee Bob Holden won the election by a margin of 438,655 votes against his foremost opponent Republican nominee Gary Melton, thereby gaining Democratic control over the office of state treasurer. Holden was sworn in as the 42nd state treasurer of Missouri on January 12, 1993.

=== Results ===
Missouri State Treasurer election, 1992
Party	Candidate	Votes	%
Democratic	Bob Holden	1,285,890	56.55
Republican	Gary Melton	847,235	37.25
Libertarian	Janet Lewis	140,968	6.20
Total votes		2,274,093	100.00
Democratic gain from Republican			

== See also ==
- 1992 Missouri gubernatorial election
