= Mel Carnahan =

American politician (1934–2000)

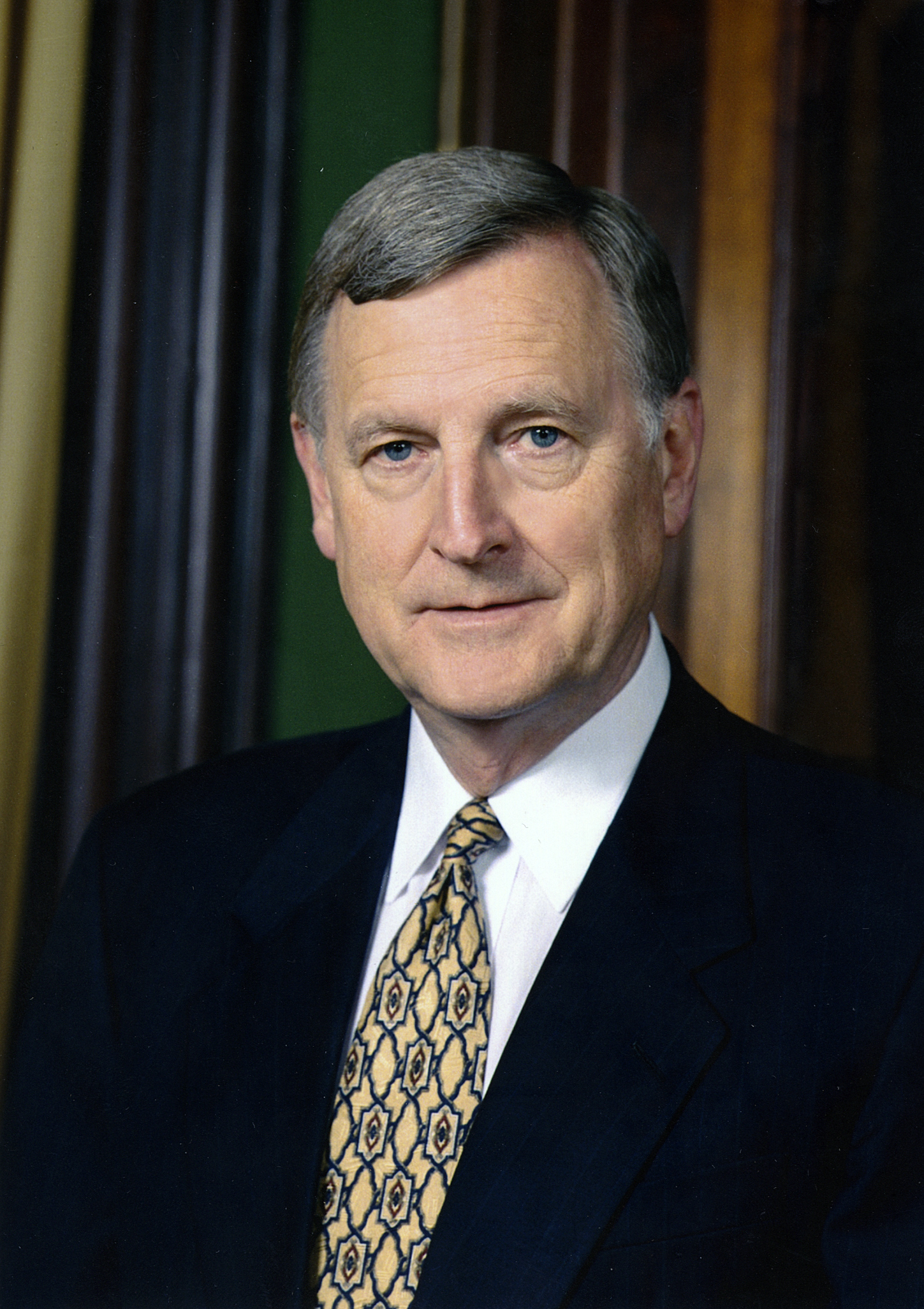
- Official portrait, c. 1997

United States Senator-elect from Missouri
- Elected posthumously November 7, 2000
- Preceded by: John Ashcroft (as senator)
- Succeeded by: Jean Carnahan (as senator)

51st Governor of Missouri
- In office January 11, 1993 – October 16, 2000
- Lieutenant: Roger B. Wilson
- Preceded by: John Ashcroft
- Succeeded by: Roger B. Wilson

43rd Lieutenant Governor of Missouri
- In office January 9, 1989 – January 11, 1993
- Governor: John Ashcroft
- Preceded by: Harriett Woods
- Succeeded by: Roger B. Wilson

40th Treasurer of Missouri
- In office January 12, 1981 – January 14, 1985
- Governor: Kit Bond
- Preceded by: Jim Spainhower
- Succeeded by: Wendell Bailey

Member of the Missouri House of Representatives from Phelps County
- In office January 2, 1963 – January 4, 1967
- Preceded by: Gene Sally
- Succeeded by: District abolished

Personal details
- Born: Melvin Eugene Carnahan; February 11, 1934 Birch Tree, Missouri, U.S.
- Died: October 16, 2000 (aged 66) near Hillsboro, Missouri, U.S.
- Party: Democratic
- Spouse: Jean Carpenter (m. 1954)
- Children: 4, including Russ and Robin
- Parent: A. S. J. Carnahan (father)
- Relatives: Carnahan family
- Education: George Washington University (BA); University of Missouri (JD)

Military service
- Allegiance: United States
- Branch: United States Air Force
- Rank: First Lieutenant
- Unit: AFOSI

Melvin Eugene Carnahan (February 11, 1934 – October 16, 2000) was an American lawyer and politician who served as the 51st governor of Missouri from 1993 until his death in 2000. Carnahan was a Democrat and held various positions in government.

Born in rural Missouri, Carnahan was the son of Representative A. S. J. Carnahan and attended campaign events with his father. He moved to Washington, D.C., with his father and attended high school and college there. After a stint in the U.S. Air Force Office of Special Investigations, Carnahan returned to Missouri, graduating from the University of Missouri in 1959. Shortly after, he moved to Rolla with an eye on entering politics.

First elected as a municipal judge in 1960, Carnahan was elected as a state representative for Phelps County in 1962, where he became majority leader during his second term. After being defeated in a race for state senate in 1966, Carnahan practiced law in Rolla. He returned to politics in 1980, being elected as state treasurer. He served in the post for four years and was defeated in the Democratic primary for governor in 1984. In 1988, he made a second political comeback, winning an election for lieutenant governor, the sole Democratic win statewide.

In 1992, Carnahan made a second bid for governor and defeated St. Louis Mayor Vincent Schoemehl in the Democratic primary. In the general election, he defeated state Attorney General William Webster, becoming the first Democrat elected governor since 1976. During his first term, he signed legislation concerning education and taxes into law. He also dealt with crises such as the Great Flood of 1993. Carnahan was re-elected in 1996, defeating State Auditor Margaret Kelly. During his second term, he faced adversity on issues such as abortion, where his veto of a bill restricting abortion was overridden by the state legislature, and faced controversy surrounding his pardon of a death row inmate at the behest of Pope John Paul II.

In 2000, he ran for the U.S. Senate against incumbent John Ashcroft in a hotly contested election. During the final weeks of the campaign, Carnahan was killed in a plane crash while on his way to a campaign event. He was posthumously elected to the U.S. Senate, and his widow, Jean Carnahan, was appointed to serve in the Senate until a special election was held in 2002.

== Early life and education ==
Melvin Eugene Carnahan was born in Birch Tree, Missouri, and grew up on a small farm near Ellsinore. He was the son of Mary Kathel (née Schupp) and A. S. J. Carnahan, and had one sibling, an older brother, Robert "Bob" Carnahan. Carnahan's mother was a teacher, and his father was the superintendent of Ellsinore schools. In 1944, the elder Carnahan was elected to the United States House of Representatives, representing the eighth congressional district, serving from 1945 to 1947 and from 1949 to 1961. He later became the U.S. Ambassador to Sierra Leone under John F. Kennedy. As a child, Mel Carnahan traveled with his father across the district, attending local events and helping with the campaign. In 1948, because his father was running for Congress, Carnahan was present for Harry Truman's final campaign stop in St. Louis during that year's presidential election. The younger Carnahan later said he developed a desire to enter politics because of his father.

In 1945, Carnahan moved to Washington, D.C., with his family, though they moved back to Missouri when his father lost re-election in 1946. He moved back to D.C. in 1949, where he met his future wife, Jean, at a Baptist church. He graduated from Anacostia High School and earned a Bachelor of Arts in business administration at George Washington University in 1954. After graduating, Carnahan joined the United States Air Force but failed the physical, fainting during a blood test. He then served as a special agent for the Air Force Office of Special Investigations from 1954 to October 1956. He rose to the rank of first lieutenant. After returning home, he received a Juris Doctor from the University of Missouri School of Law in Columbia in 1959, graduating Order of the Coif. He then moved to Rolla, the largest city in his father's congressional district, intending to follow his father's career path.

== Early political career ==
=== State legislator ===
Carnahan's political career started in 1960 at 26 when he was elected to serve as a judge in Rolla. In 1962, he ran for a seat in the Missouri House of Representatives. In the Democratic primary, Carnahan defeated three opponents. That November, he won the election for the Phelps County house district. He won re-election in 1964, and that same year, the Democratic caucus elected him as assistant floor leader to majority leader H. F. Patterson. In 1965, Patterson died, and the caucus elected Carnahan as his successor.

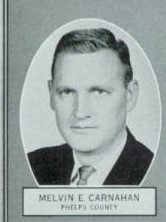
Carnahan as a state representative in 1963

During his tenure, Carnahan voted in favor of a motion to increase the state's sales tax to 3% and voted against a measure requiring tax increases to be conducted via a public vote. Carnahan served as a Judiciary Committee member, during which the committee moved to pass a conflict-of-interest law requiring any official to report any interests in a bill before voting on it. As majority leader, Carnahan was able to help advance a bill banning racial discrimination in public areas; this bill was later signed into law by Governor Warren E. Hearnes. Carnahan also sponsored a bill to prevent employers from using discriminatory hiring practices.

In 1965, a federal court ruling that Missouri's districts suffered from malapportionment forced the state to redraw its legislative districts. Carnahan helped draw up a redistricting plan, but voters rejected it in a special election. He later clashed with Governor Hearnes over his reapportionment plan for state districts, as Carnahan favored a special session on the issue. In contrast, Hearnes's plan would let him pick the members of the reapportionment commission. Eventually, a compromise was reached, and Carnahan was the deciding vote in favor of its implementation.

In 1966, Carnahan ran in the 20th district for the state Senate. In the Democratic primary, he faced Gene Sally, a former state representative and state senator whom Governor Hearnes had implicitly supported. Carnahan defeated Sally in what his wife Jean later described as one of the hardest-fought campaigns he had run. Carnahan faced Republican state senator Don Owens in the general election. The 20th district was considered more Democratic-leaning but still competitive. In November, Owens defeated Carnahan by nearly 4,000 votes. Some press outlets considered the defeat to be unexpected. Carnahan later said of the defeat: "Strangely enough, I value the experience of losing. It does something to you, but it gives perspective."

After his defeat and after his term in the state house expired, Carnahan practiced law in Rolla. In 1971, he briefly expressed interest in a bid for Missouri's eighth congressional district. Ultimately, incumbent Richard Ichord, who defeated Carnahan's father in 1960 and was planning a gubernatorial bid, ran for re-election. In addition to practicing law, Carnahan also held a role in Rozark Farms Inc., a charcoal company his father founded, until 1975, when Carnahan sold his share of the company to his brother. During this time, Carnahan also became president of the Rolla school board; during his tenure on the board, he brought in a new superintendent and helped raise funds to build a new junior high school.

=== State treasurer ===
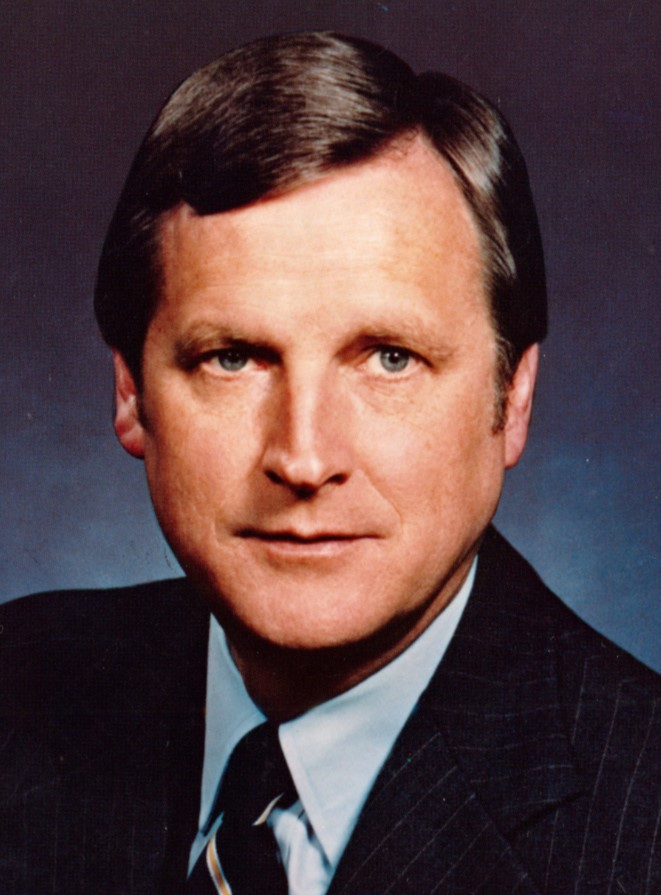
Carnahan as state treasurer in 1981

In 1979, Carnahan announced his return to politics by declaring his candidacy for Missouri state treasurer, which he also intended to use as a basis for a future gubernatorial run. He had briefly considered another bid for Missouri's eighth congressional district, which Richard Ichord was vacating. However, he had already declared his candidacy for the treasurer post when Ichord announced his retirement.

In the Democratic primary, Carnahan faced state representative and former state House majority whip Ed Sweeney, who attacked Carnahan as indebted to banking interests. Carnahan criticized Sweeney for being hypocritical because Sweeney had solicited from banking interests himself, albeit unsuccessfully. Carnahan defeated Sweeney and faced former state senator Gerald Winship in the general election. Carnahan focused his campaign on continuing to build on the work of outgoing treasurer Jim Spainhower in giving funds in a nonpartisan manner and refrained from making personal attacks on his opponent, who ran a similar campaign. Carnahan won the election, returning him to elected office.

Carnahan served as treasurer from 1981 to 1985. During his tenure, Carnahan increased the number of banks that were performing state business, issuing policy changes to address the issue of the state favoring certain banks, and set up a committee to determine which banks would be selected to perform state business. He also enforced a policy to give state funds to banks that gave agriculture-related loans. Additionally, during his tenure, Carnahan allowed certain banks to receive state deposits, with special attention to newer banks and banks willing to support small businesses and minority owned businesses. While in office, Carnahan distributed a column to weekly newspapers called "It's Your Money," detailing activities undertaken by the treasurer's office.

In 1983, the Kansas City Times reported that Carnahan asked bankers and lawyers to go on a trip to China and the Soviet Union. The trip was sponsored by People to People International, which gave the head of the delegation a free trip. Missouri Common Cause director Ruth Bamberger said while Carnahan had not done anything illegal, the situation might make the treasurer's office appear more favorable toward bankers who participated. Carnahan said there was nothing inappropriate about the trip, noting that under rules he had issued as treasurer, he had no say in which banks received state deposits. The Times also reported that Carnahan had printed invitations on replicas of his official stationery; Carnahan said he printed the letters with his own funds.

In 1984, Carnahan ran for Governor of Missouri. Due to struggles with raising funds during his campaign, Carnahan walked over 300 miles from St. Louis to Kansas City, a move similar to what Governor Joseph Teasdale had done during his first campaign in 1972. Carnahan also campaigned in opposition to state referendums that would legalize parimutuel betting and would create a state lottery. However, he conceded he would enforce the amendments if the public supported them. Both amendments would pass with over 60% of the vote. Carnahan received the endorsements of former Governor Teasdale and the Missouri chapter of the National Organization for Women. In the August primary, Carnahan lost the Democratic nomination to Lieutenant Governor Kenneth Rothman, who lost the general election to state Attorney General John Ashcroft.

=== Lieutenant governor ===
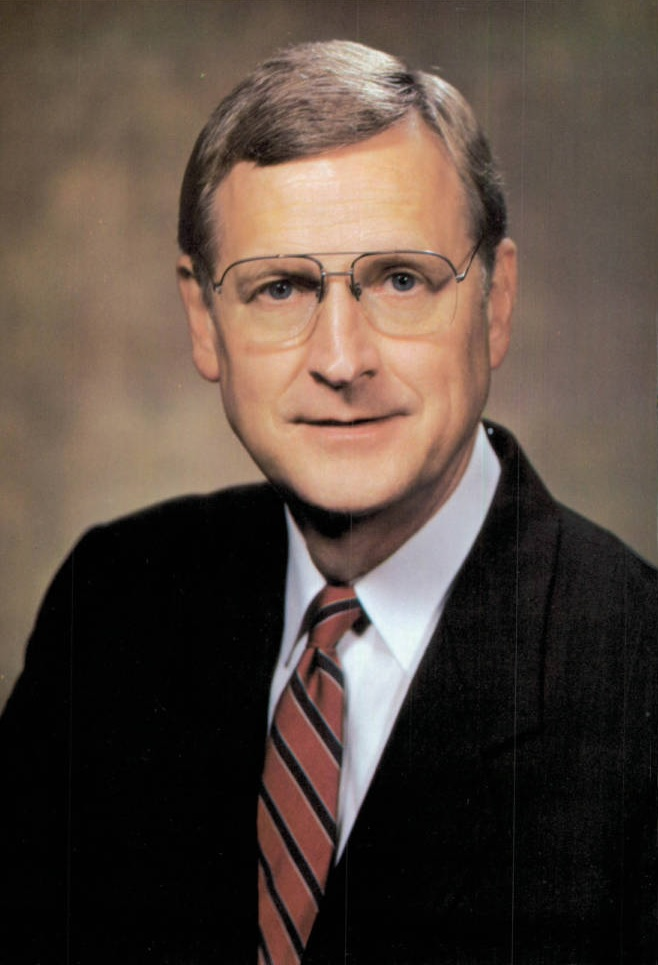
Carnahan as lieutenant governor, 1989

After his defeat, Carnahan returned to practicing law in Rolla. In 1986, Democrats favored him to run for Missouri's eighth congressional district against incumbent Bill Emerson, and he met with leaders to discuss the race. He did not run, and Wayne Cryts would ultimately become the Democratic nominee. During this time, Carnahan expressed interest in becoming chair of the Missouri Democratic Party. In 1988, after initially expressing a lack of interest in running, Carnahan ran for lieutenant governor, which he won. Carnahan's election to the lieutenant governorship was the sole Democratic statewide win that year.

The role of lieutenant governor had been seen as irrelevant, and some officials, such as state senator Harry Wiggins, supported measures to abolish the position. Carnahan appealed to the legislature to double the staffing for his office and to expand his access to state planes. He also expressed interest in using the office for economic and highway development. Senate President Pro Tempore Jim Matthewson called upon Carnahan to become the state's drug czar, although Carnahan saw his role as more limited in scope.

Early in Carnahan's term, a disagreement arose between Carnahan and Governor John Ashcroft over who was in charge when the governor left the state. Carnahan asserted that in his position, he would be acting governor whenever Ashcroft left the state, while Ashcroft believed he was still in charge. In 1990, Republican Secretary of State Roy Blunt refused to authorize documents Ashcroft signed while he was out of state, a move some political observers contended had been planned. Blunt refused to authorize the documents, owing to confusion over who was in charge while the governor was out of state. Ashcroft called upon the Supreme Court of Missouri to clarify the lieutenant governor's role while the governor was out of state. Later that year, while briefly serving as acting governor, Carnahan signed documents, but Blunt refused to authorize them. Blunt cited the ongoing court case as his reason for not authorizing the documents, while acknowledging he thought Carnahan was acting governor. A circuit judge ruled the governor was in charge, a ruling the state's Supreme Court later affirmed in 1991. This time was later thought to be the beginning of a rivalry between Ashcroft and Carnahan.

While serving as lieutenant governor, Carnahan endorsed Arkansas Governor Bill Clinton for president of the United States in the Missouri primary.

== Governor of Missouri ==
As the sole elected Democrat statewide, observers, such as Springfield News-Leader's Robert Edwards, immediately saw Carnahan as a prospective candidate for the governorship. In 1989, he announced his intent to run for governor in 1992. In the Democratic primary, he faced Mayor of St. Louis Vincent C. Schoemehl, who referred to Carnahan as a "redneck from Rolla". Politicians from both parties had perceived Carnahan as an underwhelming candidate who was liked as a person but generally unexciting. Some of Schoemehl's supporters tried to persuade Carnahan to run against Senator Kit Bond in the 1992 U.S. Senate race. Carnahan won the Democratic nomination by a wide margin, winning every county but Ste. Genevieve.

Carnahan faced Republican state Attorney General William L. Webster in the general election. Controversy surrounding the state's Second Injury Fund and Webster's ties to private lawyers associated with the fund hurt his campaign. In the general election on November 3, Carnahan was elected as governor of Missouri, defeating Webster by over 400,000 votes. Carnahan's election as governor made him the first Democrat to win the office since Joseph Teasdale's victory in 1976.

=== First term (1993–1997) ===
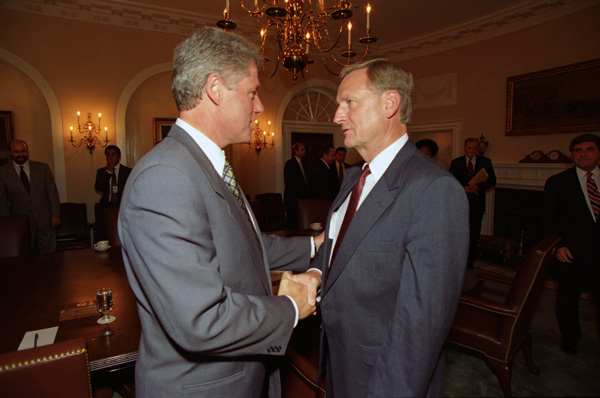
President Bill Clinton and Carnahan in 1993

Carnahan's term as governor began on January 11, 1993. On January 15, 1993, Judge Byron Kinder ruled that the state's school funding method was unconstitutional. In response to the ruling, Carnahan pushed for the "Outstanding Schools Act". The law's provisions included funding for smaller classrooms, putting computers in classrooms, and supporting vocational programs. Carnahan, who appealed to skeptical legislators, secured approval from the legislature to increase taxes on income, corporations, and tobacco to raise funds. The passed bill raised $315 million in new taxes, earning Carnahan the moniker "the education governor".

The bill faced opponents who contended that Carnahan broke a promise to bring significant tax increases to a vote for the people to decide. U.S. Representative Mel Hancock criticized the tax increases, saying they defied the state's Hancock Amendment, an amendment limiting tax increases without voter approval, of which Hancock was the namesake. Consequently, Hancock put an amendment up for a vote in November 1994, which mandated that all future tax increases require a vote. Carnahan opposed the amendment, saying it would cut billions of dollars from the state's budget, possibly forcing the layoffs of teachers and state police. The amendment was defeated by 36 points. In the aftermath, Carnahan persuaded lawmakers to support a yearly cap on tax increases. In 1996, he endorsed a ballot proposal that limited tax raises to no more than $50 million a year unless the people of Missouri voted otherwise. The amendment passed with 69% of voters in favor of its implementation.

The Great Flood of 1993, one of the most destructive floods in U.S. history, affected much of the Midwest, including Missouri. Carnahan returned from a trip to Europe to declare a state of emergency in every county. Carnahan traveled across Missouri viewing areas damaged by flooding, and called a special session of the state legislature to decide how to pay for the damage. As a result of the floods, Carnahan oversaw the buyout of affected towns, including the cities of Pattonsburg and Bellefontaine Neighbors. In addition, Carnahan signed legislation including property tax relief for flood victims and state spending on par with federal funding, while vetoing legislation that would have let the state be held responsible for some flood insurance for businesses. His actions during the emergency led other governors to elect him vice chairman of the Democratic Governors Association and vice chairman of the Southern Governors' Association. He later became chair of both organizations and gained a seat on the executive committee of the National Governors Association.

Carnahan considered health care a key focus for the 1994 legislative session. His goals, such as mandating health insurance companies to ignore pre-existing conditions, failed to be passed by the legislature. Later that year, Carnahan signed a welfare package with a provision that made recipients sign an agreement to get off welfare in two years in exchange for training for jobs and better benefits. In September 1994, Carnahan called for a special session to impeach Secretary of State Judith Moriarty. Moriarty had been found guilty of certifying election documents for her son, who had incorrectly filed the documents. Carnahan appealed to Moriarty to resign, but she refused. Consequently, Moriarty was impeached and removed from office. Carnahan appointed her replacement, Bekki Cook.

In 1995, Carnahan underwent a trade mission to South Korea, one of Missouri's top trading partners. The mission led to new deals between Missouri businesses valued at over $2 million. That same year, Carnahan appointed Ronnie L. White to the Supreme Court of Missouri, the first black judge to be appointed to the court. White later became the state's first black chief justice and eventually a federal judge. Carnahan would later describe White's appointment as one of his greatest. Carnahan maintained continuously high approval ratings throughout his first term.

=== Second term (1997–2000) ===
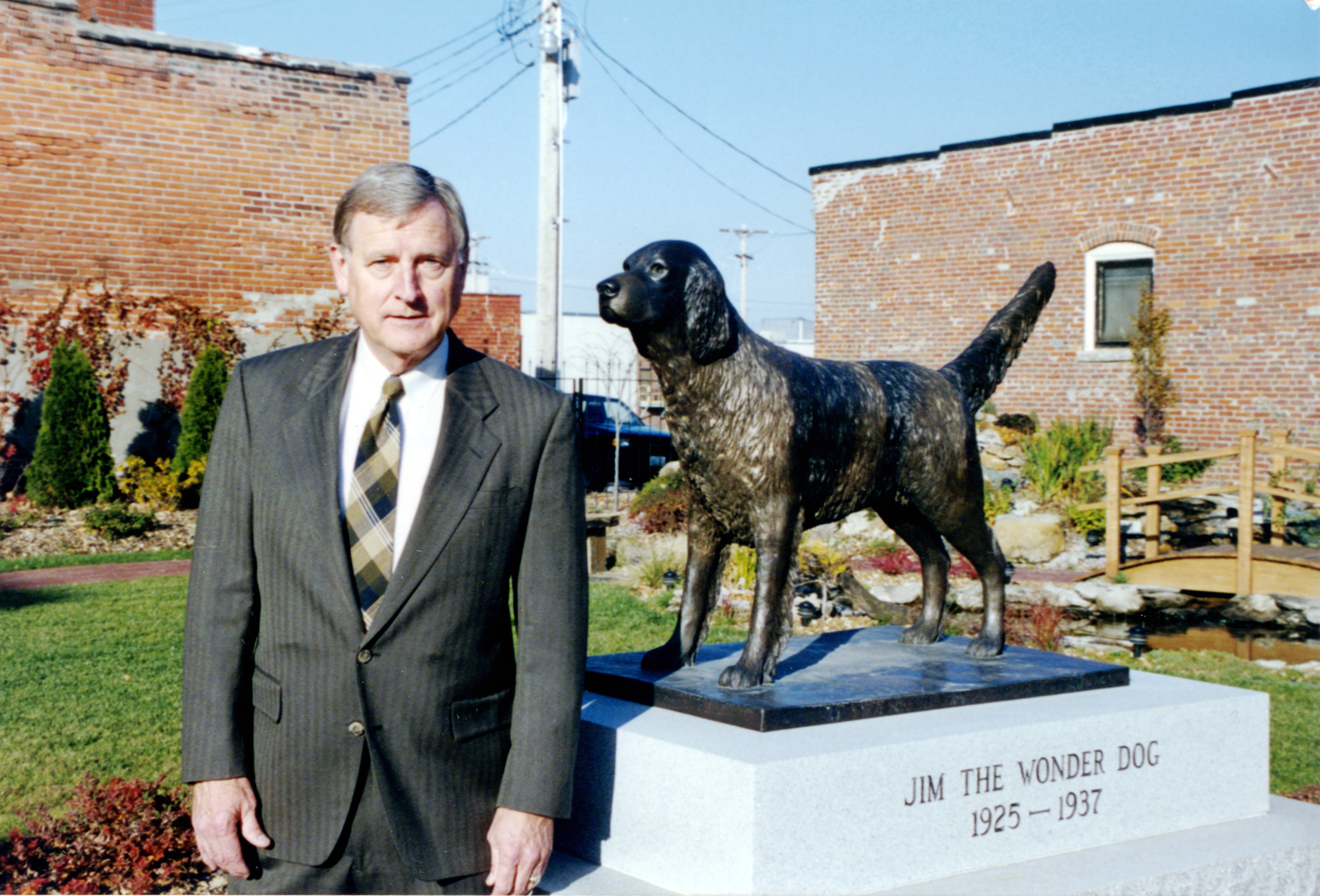
Carnahan and a statue of Jim the Wonder Dog in 1999

In 1996, Carnahan ran for re-election, campaigning on the Outstanding Schools Act, which he argued made way for optimized education methods in the state. His opponent was Republican State Auditor Margaret B. Kelly. Kelly criticized Carnahan as "tax-man Carnahan" for the tax increases needed for education, which she maintained were a broken promise from the governor. On November 5, 1996, Carnahan defeated Kelly to win a second term in office.

Because of the Hancock Amendment's provisions on curbing spending, Carnahan returned sizable amounts of money to taxpayers over his second term. In 1997, lawmakers agreed to remove the state's grocery tax and reduce taxes for private pensions, which Carnahan signed into law. In 1998, Carnahan signed further tax cuts into law, increasing tax credits for elderly and disabled citizens. The following year, he signed legislation giving tax credits on prescription drugs to older Missourians. By the end of 1999, the tax cuts totaled about $1.3 billion.

In 1997, a judge ruled that Missouri could conclude its involvement in school desegregation cases in St. Louis and Kansas City, provided that a plan to replace state funding was in place by 1999. In 1998, Carnahan signed legislation to prevent the Kansas City school districts from becoming insolvent. He later signed legislation that created a school board for St. Louis school districts, provided some $40 million to public schools in the city, and sought to add suburban school districts to state funding. Also in 1998, Carnahan enacted a bill to expand Medicaid coverage for impoverished children. In August 1998, he made his second appointment to the Missouri Supreme Court, appointing Michael A. Wolff, his former legal advisor. Wolff later served as chief justice for the court from 2005 to 2007.

In 1999, Carnahan, who supported the death penalty, commuted the death sentence of Missouri inmate Darrell Mease after Pope John Paul II requested he do so during his visit to St. Louis. This move was controversial: Carnahan's office received more phone calls against the move than those supportive, and 34% of voters indicated in a St. Louis Post-Dispatch poll that they felt inclined to vote against Carnahan in his U.S. Senate bid as a result of the move. That same year, he opposed a proposition that would have allowed Missourians to carry concealed weapons. The campaign against the proposal, managed by his daughter Robin, won by a two-point margin despite being outspent.

Carnahan had vetoed three abortion bills in 1997. The issue returned to the political agenda in 1999 when the Missouri legislature proposed a bill to ban mid to late-term abortions. Carnahan vetoed the bill due to its language, which he argued went further than just restricting mid to late-term abortions, and because it lacked exceptions for protecting the mother's health. The legislature overrode Carnahan's veto, making him the seventh governor since Missouri's statehood to have a veto overridden.

=== 2000 U.S. Senate election ===
The day after the 1998 midterm elections, Carnahan announced his intention to challenge incumbent Senator John Ashcroft for his U.S. Senate seat in 2000. Despite some calls for him to run for the Class 1 Senate seat in 1994, he declined, wanting to remain governor. He also declined to run in 1998 against Kit Bond, though he refused to consider a future bid permanently out of the question.

Various news outlets, such as CBS News and Roll Call, noted the election had a personal element due to Carnahan and Ashcroft's reported dislike of one another, though both denied having any rivalry. Analyst Stuart Rothenberg considered the campaign to be among the closest races in the country. During the campaign, photographs of Carnahan performing in blackface in 1960 resurfaced, for which he apologized and asked that voters judge his record of supporting civil rights. Carnahan attacked Ashcroft for having a conservative voting record despite employing moderate rhetoric while casting his record as governor as a "moderate, progressive" record. During the campaign, Carnahan launched a tour by train, using a tactic adopted by Harry S. Truman. The tour was an homage to the former president, who had previously held the Senate seat Carnahan was campaigning for.

== Death and aftermath ==
Early in the evening of October 16, 2000, Carnahan, his son Randy, and his campaign advisor Chris Sifford left St. Louis Downtown Airport in Cahokia, Illinois, to attend a campaign event in New Madrid. The Cessna 335 airplane, which Randy piloted, crashed near Hillsboro, Missouri, killing all three people on board. The National Transportation Safety Board (NTSB) later ruled that the crash was due to Randy becoming disoriented, which was exacerbated by inclement weather and instrument failure.

The presidential debate, held the next day in St. Louis, opened with a moment of silence, and both candidates made remarks about Carnahan's death. A memorial service for Carnahan was held in the State Capitol in Jefferson City on October 20. President Bill Clinton, First Lady Hillary Clinton, Vice President Al Gore, and U.S. senators and former governors Kit Bond and John Ashcroft attended the service. At the funeral, President Clinton said:

I loved the guy, and anybody who thinks he was dull never looked him straight in the eye, because he had steel and passion and fire, and I think he rather enjoyed being underestimated by the people who disagreed with him.

The day after Carnahan's death, Lieutenant Governor Roger B. Wilson ascended to the governorship. He served the remainder of Carnahan's term. Because Missouri election law did not allow Carnahan's name to be removed from the ballot, Governor Wilson promised to appoint his widow, Jean Carnahan, to the seat if it became vacant due to Mel Carnahan's election win. Shortly before his death, Carnahan had been behind Ashcroft in the polls. Following his death, Carnahan's campaign continued, using slogans such as "I'm Still with Mel" and "Don't Let the Fire Go Out," and Carnahan took the lead in a few polls. In the election, Carnahan became the first person in U.S. history to win a U.S. Senate election posthumously. Professor William T. Horner suggested that Carnahan's death might have helped Democrats in other down-ballot races that year, including the race for governor. Following the election win, Jean Carnahan was appointed to the Senate and served until November 2002, when Republican Jim Talent defeated her in a special election.

== Awards and recognitions ==
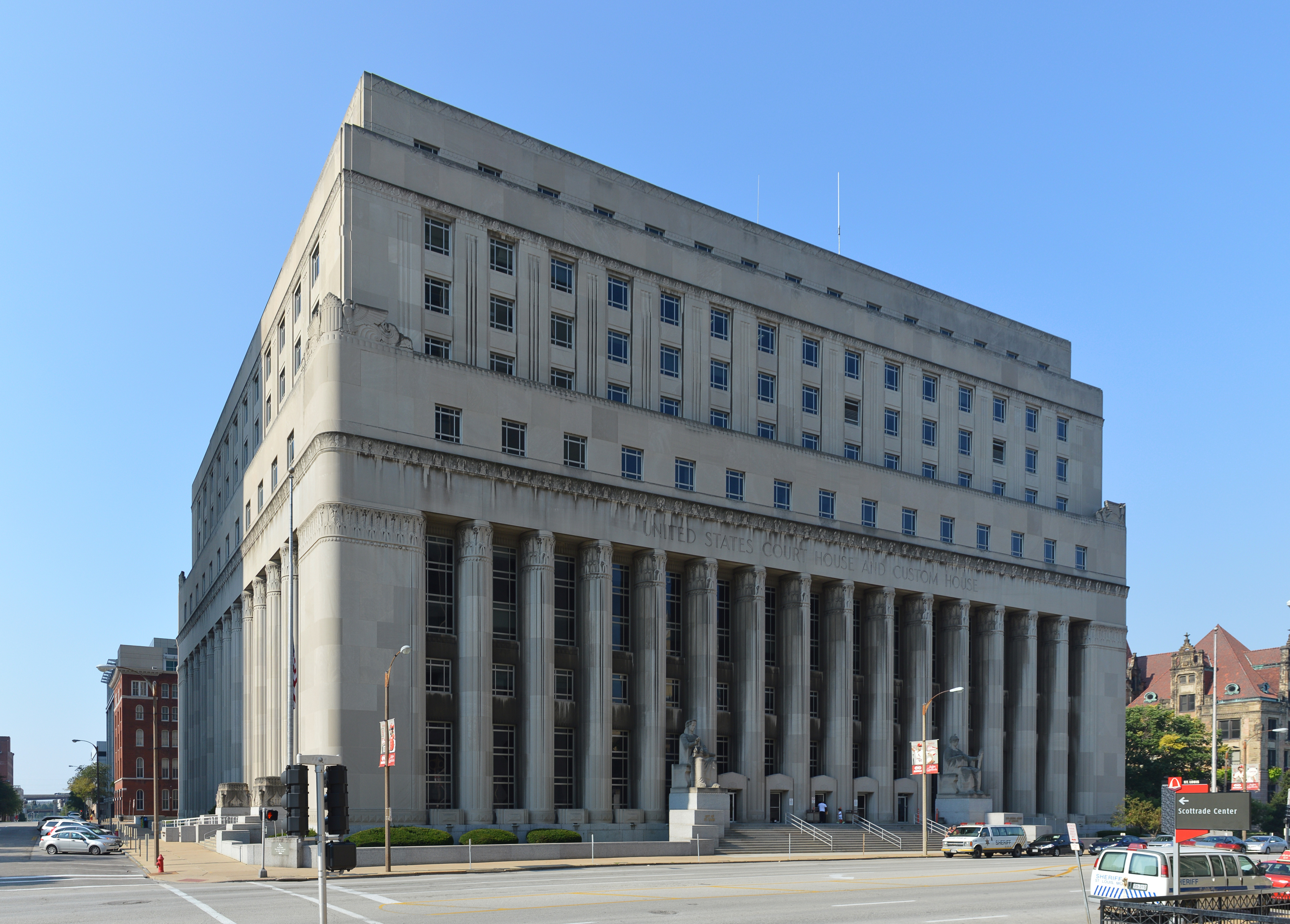
The Mel Carnahan Courthouse in St. Louis

In 1965, Carnahan received an award from Missouri House Speaker Thomas C. Graham, recognizing him as the chamber's most outstanding Democrat. Also, during his tenure as a state legislator, he twice received the St. Louis Globe-Democrat's Meritorious Service award. In 1999, he was inducted into the DeMolay International Hall of Fame.

In 2001, the mayor of St. Louis, Clarence Harmon, announced the renaming of a courthouse to the Carnahan Courthouse. That same year, a Missouri National Guard armory in Rolla, Missouri, was renamed The Mel Carnahan Armory and Reserve Center. The Carnahan High School of the Future was named after him in 2003. After his death, the garden in the Missouri Capitol was renamed after Carnahan. A bust of him was placed there in 2023 and received a dedication in 2024, just one week after his wife's death.

== Personal life ==
Carnahan met his future wife, Jean Carpenter, at a church event and sat beside her at Anacostia High School. The two married in Washington, D.C., on June 12, 1954. They had four children, who would all become lawyers as well: Roger "Randy" Carnahan, who piloted the airplane and died in the same crash that killed his father; Russ Carnahan, a former member of the U.S. House of Representatives for Missouri's 3rd district (2005–2013); Robin Carnahan, former Missouri Secretary of State (2005–2013), 2010 U.S. Senate nominee, and Administrator of General Services under President Joe Biden; and Tom Carnahan, founder of Wind Capital Group, which builds wind farms. The family had a Newfoundland dog named Beaumont.

A reporter once said of Carnahan: "Never the most exciting politician on the Missouri scene, Carnahan stubbornly and quietly plowed through office after office." Carnahan was noted for having an honest image coupled with a relaxed personality. Many supporters of his wore straight-arrow pins to highlight this. He also had a humorous side; he once granted a pardon to a boy who sought one after lying to his parents. Carnahan and his family were active members of First Baptist Church of Rolla, where he served as an ordained deacon, and he and his wife taught Sunday School. In his spare time, Carnahan was a pilot.

== Electoral history ==
Missouri State Treasurer election, 1980
Party	Candidate	Votes	%
Democratic	Mel Carnahan	1,213,720	61.80
Republican	Gerald E. Winship	750,312	38.20
Total votes		1,964,032	100.00
Democratic hold			

1984 Democratic gubernatorial primary
Party	Candidate	Votes	%
Democratic	Ken Rothman	288,543	56.05%
Democratic	Mel Carnahan	104,368	20.27%
Democratic	Norman Merrell	97,973	19.03%
Democratic	Lavoy Reed	10,144	1.97%
Democratic	Bob Buck	5,839	1.13%
Democratic	Roy Smith	5,141	1.00%
Democratic	Don Pine	2,832	0.55%
Total votes		514,840	100.00%

1988 Missouri lieutenant gubernatorial election
Party	Candidate	Votes	%	±%
Democratic	Mel Carnahan	1,054,307	51.81%	
Republican	Richard B. "R.B." Grisham	957,698	47.06%	
Libertarian	Richard Rosenberg	22,992	1.13%	
Majority		96,609		
Turnout				
Democratic hold		Swing		

1992 Missouri gubernatorial election
Party	Candidate	Votes	%	±%
Democratic	Mel Carnahan	1,375,425	58.68	+23.93
Republican	William L. Webster	968,574	41.32	−22.90
Libertarian	Joan Dow (write-in)	66	0.00	−1.03
Majority		406,851	17.36	−12.10
Turnout		2,344,065	45.81	+3.38
Democratic gain from Republican		Swing		

1996 Missouri gubernatorial election
Party	Candidate	Votes	%	±%
Democratic	Mel Carnahan (incumbent)	1,224,801	57.17	−1.51
Republican	Margaret B. Kelly	866,268	40.43	−0.89
Libertarian	J. Mark Oglesby	51,432	2.40	+2.40
N/A	V. Marvalene Pankey (write-in)	10	0.00	
N/A	Jock Peacock (write-in)	7	0.00	
Majority		358,533	16.73	−0.63
Turnout		2,142,518	41.87	−3.94
Democratic hold		Swing		

2000 United States Senate election in Missouri
Party	Candidate	Votes	%
Democratic	Mel Carnahan †	1,191,812	50.46%
Republican	John Ashcroft (incumbent)	1,142,852	48.39%
Green	Evaline Taylor	10,612	0.45%
Libertarian	Grant Samuel Stauffer	10,198	0.43%
Reform	Hugh Foley	4,166	0.18%
Natural Law	Charles Dockins	1,933	0.08%
Write-in		13	0.00%
Total votes		2,361,586	100.0
Democratic gain from Republican			

Party political offices
Preceded by Jim Spainhower	Democratic nominee for Treasurer of Missouri; 1980	Succeeded by Tom Villa
Preceded by Harriett Woods	Democratic nominee for Lieutenant Governor of Missouri; 1988	Succeeded by Roger B. Wilson
Preceded by Betty Cooper Hearnes	Democratic nominee for Governor of Missouri; 1992, 1996	Succeeded by Bob Holden
Preceded by Alan Wheat	Democratic nominee for U.S. Senator from Missouri (Class 1); 2000	Succeeded by Jean Carnahan
Preceded by Evan Bayh	Chair of the Democratic Governors Association; 1994–1995	Succeeded by Gaston Caperton
Political offices
Preceded by Jim Spainhower	Treasurer of Missouri; 1981–1985	Succeeded by Wendell Bailey
Preceded by Harriett Woods	Lieutenant Governor of Missouri; 1989–1993	Succeeded by Roger B. Wilson
Preceded by John Ashcroft	Governor of Missouri; 1993–2000	Succeeded by Roger B. Wilson
U.S. Senate
Preceded by John Ashcroft	U.S. Senator-elect (Class 1) from Missouri; 2000; Served alongside: Kit Bond	Succeeded by Jean Carnahan
