= Unintended Consequences (novel) =

1996 novel by John Ross

- Author: John Ross
- Language: English
- Publisher: Accurate Press
- Publication date: 1996
- Publication place: United States
- Media type: Print

Unintended Consequences is a novel by John Ross, first published in 1996 by Accurate Press. The story chronicles the history of gun culture, gun rights, and gun control in the United States from the early 20th century through the late 1990s. Although clearly a work of fiction, the story is heavily laced with historical fact, including historical figures who play minor supporting roles. The protagonist—just like the author himself—is very active in competitive shooting sports, so unusually detailed and intricate facts, figures, and explanations of firearms-related topics ornament the narrative and drive the plot.

The cover has a picture of Lady Justice being assaulted by an ATF agent.

The book was listed by The New York Times' Sunday Book Review as one of the most sought after out-of-print books of 2013.

== Background ==
The story hinges upon the enactment and subsequent unintended consequences of several important pieces of U.S. gun control legislation and regulation: the National Firearms Act of 1934, the Gun Control Act of 1968, the Firearm Owners Protection Act of 1986, the Assault Weapons Importation Ban enacted by Presidential executive order in 1989, and the Federal Assault Weapons Ban of 1994.

Its thesis, as discussed in the “Author's Note – A Warning and Disclaimer” in the beginning of the book, is that enough bullying, by what is widely perceived as a hostile occupation government, will inevitably end in revolt if the occupied area is large enough and has a culture that is significantly different from the occupying state, and that this revolt will be undefeatable if the rebels use very low-tech "leaderless resistance."

== Characters ==
Henry Bowman is the principal character, although the story begins in 1906, long before Bowman's birth on January 10, 1953. The story is told primarily from his perspective when he is in his early forties. Bowman grows up in the St. Louis, Missouri area, where much of the story takes place. He is a trained geologist, a self-taught expert marksman, a firearms, ammunition, and self-defense authority, and a pilot. Bowman lives on a rural acreage near the St. Louis, Missouri metropolitan area. There is an abandoned stone quarry on his land which Bowman uses for recreational shooting. Bowman, in the novel, enjoys owning performance automobiles and driving at high speed on interstate highways. In one part of the novel, he races his hot-rodded GMC truck against a rival Porsche, with Bowman winning, driving in excess of 140 mph (230 km/h) to win. Bowman also has several forged identities that he uses for various purposes in the novel. Bowman is a proficient skydiver.

Walter "Blackout" Bowman is Henry's father. A skilled pilot and U.S. Navy officer, he trained 437 naval aviators during World War II, retiring as a Lieutenant Commander. He represents the studious, responsible, and thoughtful side of the younger Bowman. The author has stated that the elder Bowman is based on his own father.

Max Collins is Bowman's uncle. He is portrayed as a larger-than-life character who is an expert marksman, professional gambler, and accomplished ladies' man. He served in the airborne troops of D-Day, and killed a German army officer in combat with his sniper rifle. In the novel, at a 1960s Nevada shooting competition, he bets on his nephew Henry's shooting, winning $10,000. He represents the adventurous, spontaneous, and aggressive side of the younger Henry Bowman. The author has stated that Collins is based on his own uncle.

Irwin Mann is a survivor of The Holocaust and the Warsaw Ghetto, and a key participant in the Warsaw Ghetto Uprising. His inclusion in the story permits a study of the use of firearms by average citizens to repel an oppressive government and connects Nazi gun control measures to American gun control efforts.

Ray Johnson is a New York City attorney, originally from Aspen, Colorado, who moves to Africa in 1963 and becomes a big-game safari guide. His return to the U.S. in 1994 serves to illustrate how much U.S. gun owners' freedoms have eroded, due to legislation and executive orders enacted during his absence. At the airport, Customs attempts to confiscate an English double rifle worth some US$40,000, a Belgian FN FAL semi-automatic rifle, a Smith & Wesson 2" Chief's Special revolver, and his hat which has a leopard skin hat band. Ray calls his friend Henry, and Henry calls in a favor with a friend who is a high-ranking Customs official. Ray is allowed to keep his firearms and enter the United States.

Allen Kane is a major machine gun dealer who is Henry's lifelong friend. A major shift in the novel's plot occurs when Henry finds corrupt ATF agents framing Allen, himself, and another firearms dealer. Allen aids and accompanies Henry in much of the novel.

Cindy Caswell is a victim of childhood abuse and organized crime who becomes important in the freedom struggle as it develops. She is from Rolla, Missouri. She is abducted by mafia thugs during a trip to Chicago, Illinois, who force her to become a sex slave for mafia bosses and leaders. After several years, she escapes and meets Henry Bowman at an Alcoholics Anonymous meeting. She assassinates many pro-gun control and big-government politicians and legislators in the novel. The author has been criticized for creating an "adolescent fantasy" with this character. Ten years after writing the novel, Ross met Tammy Chapman, whose early life shares a resemblance to that of the fictional Caswell. Ross and Chapman now live together in St. Louis.

== Plot ==
The novel's protagonist, Henry Bowman, shows an early proficiency with firearms, practicing whenever he can find the time. Encouraged by his father, he gathers an impressive firearms collection and gains extensive experience in piloting small aircraft. During college, Bowman is robbed, beaten, and sodomized by a rural gang. The incident nearly destroys him and causes him to become an alcoholic for a period.

While at a gun show in Indianapolis, Indiana with friend Allen Kane, Bowman publicly embarrasses an agent of the Bureau of Alcohol, Tobacco, Firearms and Explosives (ATF), Wilson Blair. One of Blair's men was trying to trick and entrap a fellow firearms dealer. Blair takes the offense personally, and with the support of the ATF's director, begins to plan revenge. Several years later, Blair and subordinate agents of the ATF plan to frame Henry and his friends as terrorists, smugglers, and counterfeiters. They plan to plant "evidence" when the men are away on vacation. Unbeknownst to Blair, Bowman delays his departure at the last minute due to a work commitment, and is on a friend's property when the agents arrive. Bowman assumes the agents are burglars and engages in a gun battle with them, killing or capturing all and in the process discovering the truth about the raid.

Bowman realizes that his life has been irrevocably changed. He makes Blair record a video taped confession of his illegal actions, kills Blair, and disposes of all forensic evidence of the agents' presence. Afterwards, he hunts down and kills Blair's remaining subordinates. Bowman and his closest friends begin to systematically kill ATF agents around the nation – whom Bowman views as supporting the infringement of citizen's constitutional rights, and abusing government powers – as well as politicians who had supported unconstitutional gun control legislation. Simultaneously Bowman releases the video tape of Blair to CNN, which claims that Blair and his companions have had a change of heart, realize what they are doing is wrong, and are now dedicated to killing other ATF agents. Amidst the national search for Blair and company, Bowman continues to murder people.

Eventually, as the ATF and FBI are unable to effectively track down those responsible for the killings, the President of the United States is forced to give an address to the nation relating his intent to repeal the unconstitutional laws, including the National Firearms Act of 1934 and Gun Control Act of 1968.

=== Fictionalized accounts of historical events ===
The story contains several items of historical fiction (accounts of real events with fictionalized thoughts & dialog) that advance the book's premise and plot. The following events are featured prominently:

- Bonus Army March on Washington, D.C. (1932)
- Warsaw Ghetto Uprising (1943)
- Battle of Athens, Tennessee (1946)
- Ken Ballew raid (1971)
- 1985 MOVE bombing in Philadelphia (1985)
- FBI shootout in Miami, Florida (1986)
- John Lawmaster ATF raid in Tulsa (1991)
- Ruby Ridge incident in Idaho (1992)
- Waco Siege (1993)
- Oklahoma City bombing (1995)

== Reception ==
The novel sold over 60,000 copies of over four printings. After having been out of print for several years, a paperback edition was reissued in June, 2013.

The author's web site stated that he was working on a shorter sequel that had been originally scheduled for publication in 2006. However, the author passed away in 2022 and the sequel was never released.

=== Timothy McVeigh controversy ===
Timothy McVeigh read the novel while awaiting his trial for the Oklahoma City bombing. He viewed the book favorably, and noted that if it had come out a few years earlier, he would have given serious consideration to using sniper attacks in a war of attrition against the government instead of bombing a federal building:

If people say The Turner Diaries was my Bible, Unintended Consequences would be my New Testament. I think Unintended Consequences is a better book. It might have changed my whole plan of operation if I'd read that one first.

== Sources ==
- Author's web site, archived from the original on September 22, 2013
- An interview with the author
