= Ernest John Russell =

American architect (1870–1956)

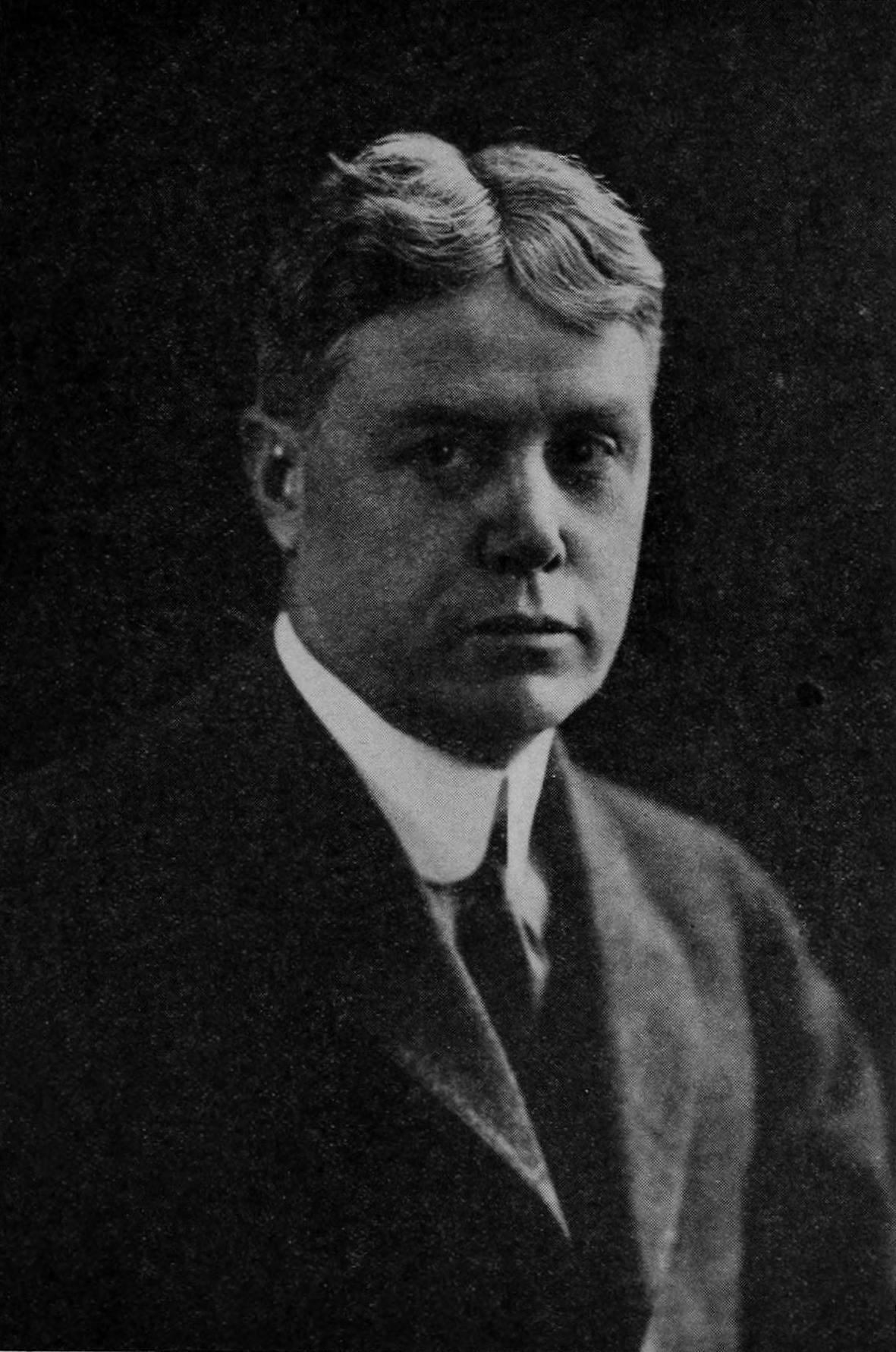
- Ernest John Russell, circa 1921
- Born: March 5, 1870; London
- Died: July 11, 1956 (aged 86); St. Louis
- Occupation: Architect

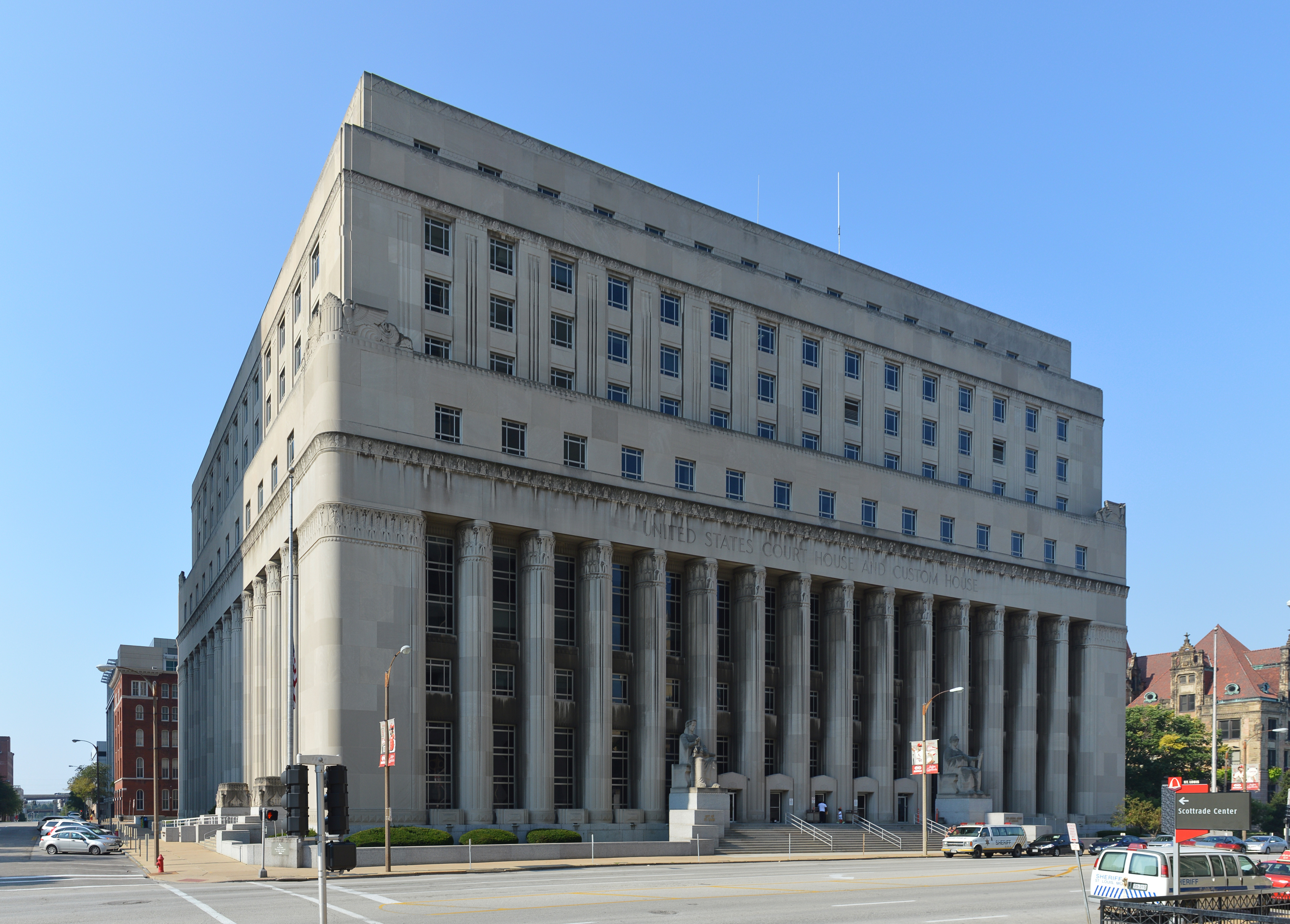
The Carnahan Courthouse in St. Louis, designed by Mauran, Russell & Crowell and completed in 1935.

Ernest John Russell FAIA (1870–1956) was an English-born American architect in practice in St. Louis from 1900 until his death in 1956. From 1932 to 1935 he was president of the American Institute of Architects.

== Life and career ==
Ernest John Russell was born March 5, 1870, in London to John Stokes Russell and Mary (Mayhew) Russell. In the early 1870s the family immigrated to the United States, settling in Colorado Springs, Colorado, where Russell was educated. In 1887 he joined the office of Frank Townsend Lent, a local architect, and worked his way up to drafter. In 1892 he moved to Chicago, where he joined the local office of Shepley, Rutan & Coolidge. In 1896 he transferred to the St. Louis office, then under the management of John Lawrence Mauran. In 1900 Mauran, Russell and a third employee, Edward Gordon Garden, bought out the firm's local business, and formed the new firm of Mauran, Russell & Garden. Garden left the partnership in 1909, but in 1911 they were joined by William DeForest Crowell to form Mauran, Russell & Crowell. The partnership was unchanged until 1930, when they were joined by William Oscar Mullgardt, an employee since 1906. Mauran died suddenly in 1933, after which Russell became the head of the firm. Russell led the firm, which became Mauran, Russell, Crowell & Mullgardt in 1937, Russell, Crowell, Mullgardt & Schwarz in 1948 and Russell, Mullgardt, Schwarz & Van Hoefen in 1955, until his death.

Russell's major works, listed by himself at the end of his career, included the Railway Exchange Building (1913), the Federal Reserve Bank of St. Louis building (1925), the Southwestern Bell Building (1926), the Globe Building (1932), the Carnahan Courthouse (1935) and the St. Louis Ordnance Plant (1942), all in St. Louis.

Russell was associated with the American Institute of Architects for much of his career. He joined the St. Louis chapter in 1901, and was elevated to Fellow in 1909. He served as chapter president and on many committees. He was twice elected national vice president before being elected president at the 1932 convention. He was reelected in 1934, no convention having been held in 1933. Russell's long-time partner, Mauran, had himself been president from 1916 to 1918.

From 1909 to 1911 Russell was a member of the St. Louis Board of Delegates, now the Board of Aldermen, and in 1911 was appointed to a three-year term to the Board of Appeals. From 1917 to 1937 he was chair of the St. Louis City Plan Commission. Russell was a member of the American Society for Testing and Materials, the American Town Planning Institute, the Civic League, the National City Planning Conference and the National Housing Conference. In 1932 he was made an honorary corresponding member of the Royal Institute of British Architects.

== Personal life and death ==
In 1895 Russell was married to Elizabeth Dunlap, a relative of Benjamin H. Warder, an important client of Shepley, Rutan & Coolidge, in Springfield, Ohio. They had two daughters.

Russell was a member of several prominent social organizations, including the University Club, St. Louis Club, Racquet Club, Noonday Club and the Bellerive Country Club.

Russell died July 11, 1956, in St. Louis.
