= 1984 Missouri gubernatorial election =

- November 6, 1984
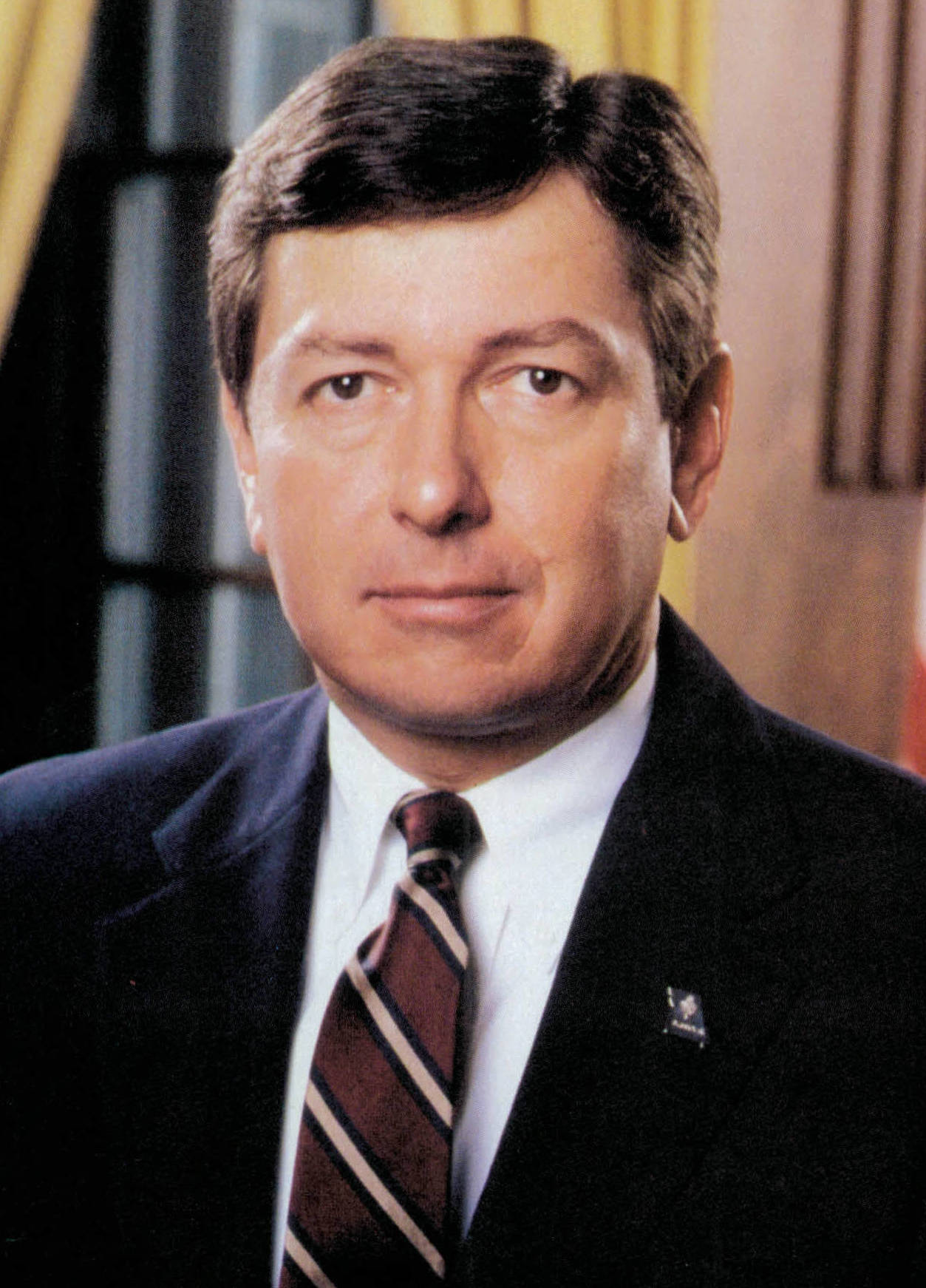

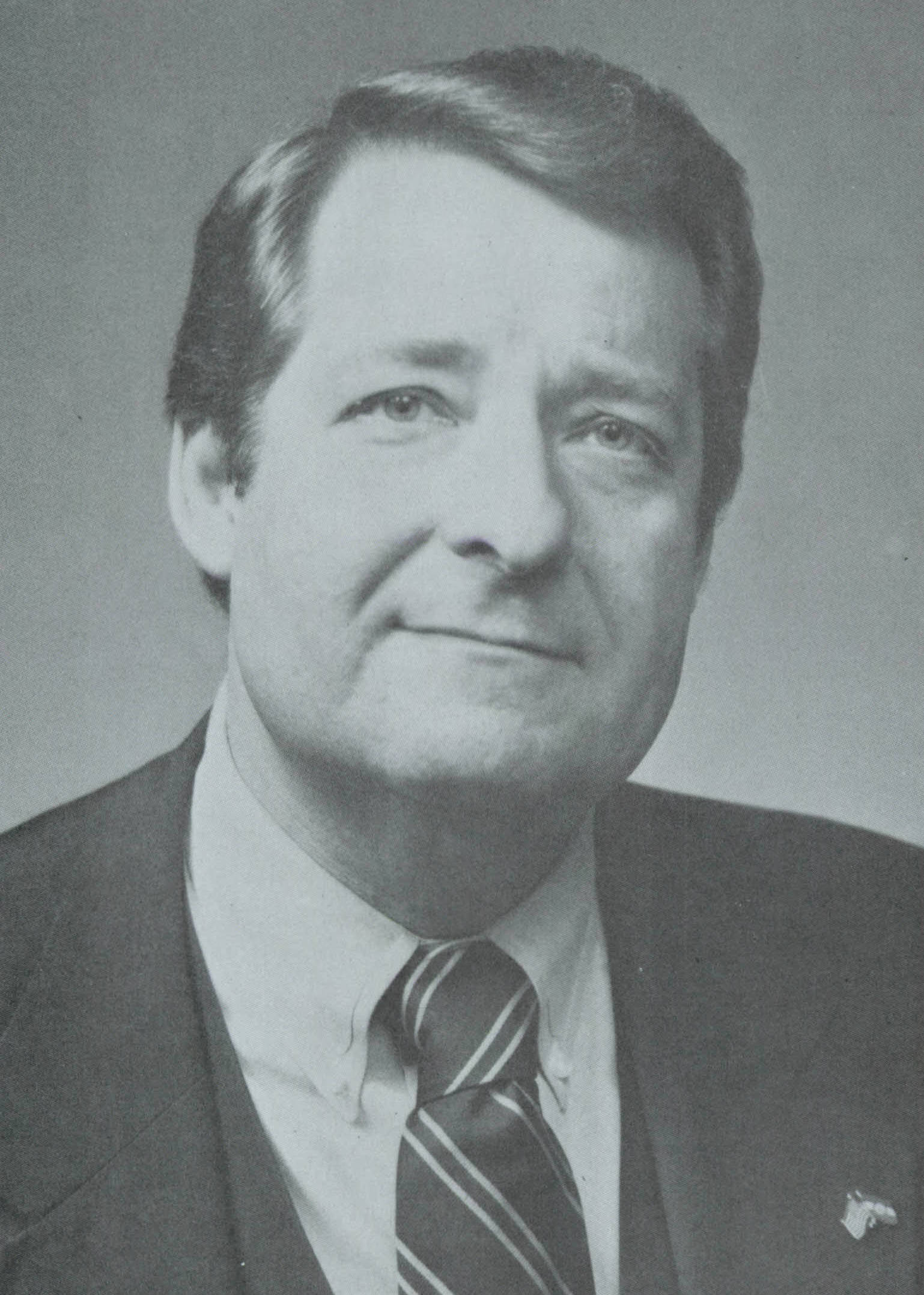
Nominee	John Ashcroft	Ken Rothman
Party	Republican	Democratic
Popular vote	1,194,506	913,700
Percentage	56.66%	43.34%
- County results Ashcroft: 50–60% 60–70% 70–80% Rothman: 50–60% 60–70%
Governor before election
Kit Bond
Republican
Elected Governor
John Ashcroft
Republican

The 1984 Missouri gubernatorial election was held on November 6, 1984, and resulted in a victory for the Republican nominee, Missouri Attorney General John Ashcroft, over the Democratic candidate, Lt. Governor Ken Rothman, and Independent Bob Allen. Incumbent Republican Governor Kit Bond, who was elected to the governorship in 1972, but lost re-election in 1976 before regaining the office in 1980, chose not to seek a third non-consecutive term.

Incidentally, both Bond and Ashcroft would later serve in the United States Senate from 1995 until 2001.

== Republican primary ==
=== Candidates ===
- John Ashcroft, attorney general of Missouri
- Paul Binggeli
- Gene McNary, St. Louis County executive and nominee for U.S. Senate in 1980

=== Results ===
1984 Republican gubernatorial primary
Party	Candidate	Votes	%
Republican	John Ashcroft	245,308	67.46%
Republican	Gene McNary	115,516	31.77%
Republican	Paul Binggeli	2,814	0.77%
Total votes		363,638	100.00%

== Democratic primary ==
=== Candidates ===
- Bob Buck
- Mel Carnahan, state treasurer
- Norman Merrell, state senator from Monticello
- Don Pine
- Lavoy Reed
- Ken Rothman, lieutenant governor and former speaker of the Missouri House
- Roy Smith

=== Results ===
1984 Democratic gubernatorial primary
Party	Candidate	Votes	%
Democratic	Ken Rothman	288,543	56.05%
Democratic	Mel Carnahan	104,368	20.27%
Democratic	Norman Merrell	97,973	19.03%
Democratic	Lavoy Reed	10,144	1.97%
Democratic	Bob Buck	5,839	1.13%
Democratic	Roy Smith	5,141	1.00%
Democratic	Don Pine	2,832	0.55%
Total votes		514,840	100.00%

== General election ==
=== Results ===
1984 gubernatorial election, Missouri
Party	Candidate	Votes	%	±%
Republican	John Ashcroft	1,194,506	56.66	▲4.03
Democratic	Ken Rothman	913,700	43.34	▼3.68
Independent	Bob Allen	4	0.00	N/A
Majority		280,806	13.32	+7.71
Turnout		2,108,210	42.88	+0.41
Republican hold		Swing		
