= Governor Holden =

Governor Holden may refer to:

- Bob Holden (born 1949), 53rd Governor of Missouri
- William Woods Holden (1818–1892), 38th and 40th Governor of North Carolina
