= 2000 Missouri lieutenant gubernatorial election =

- November 7, 2000
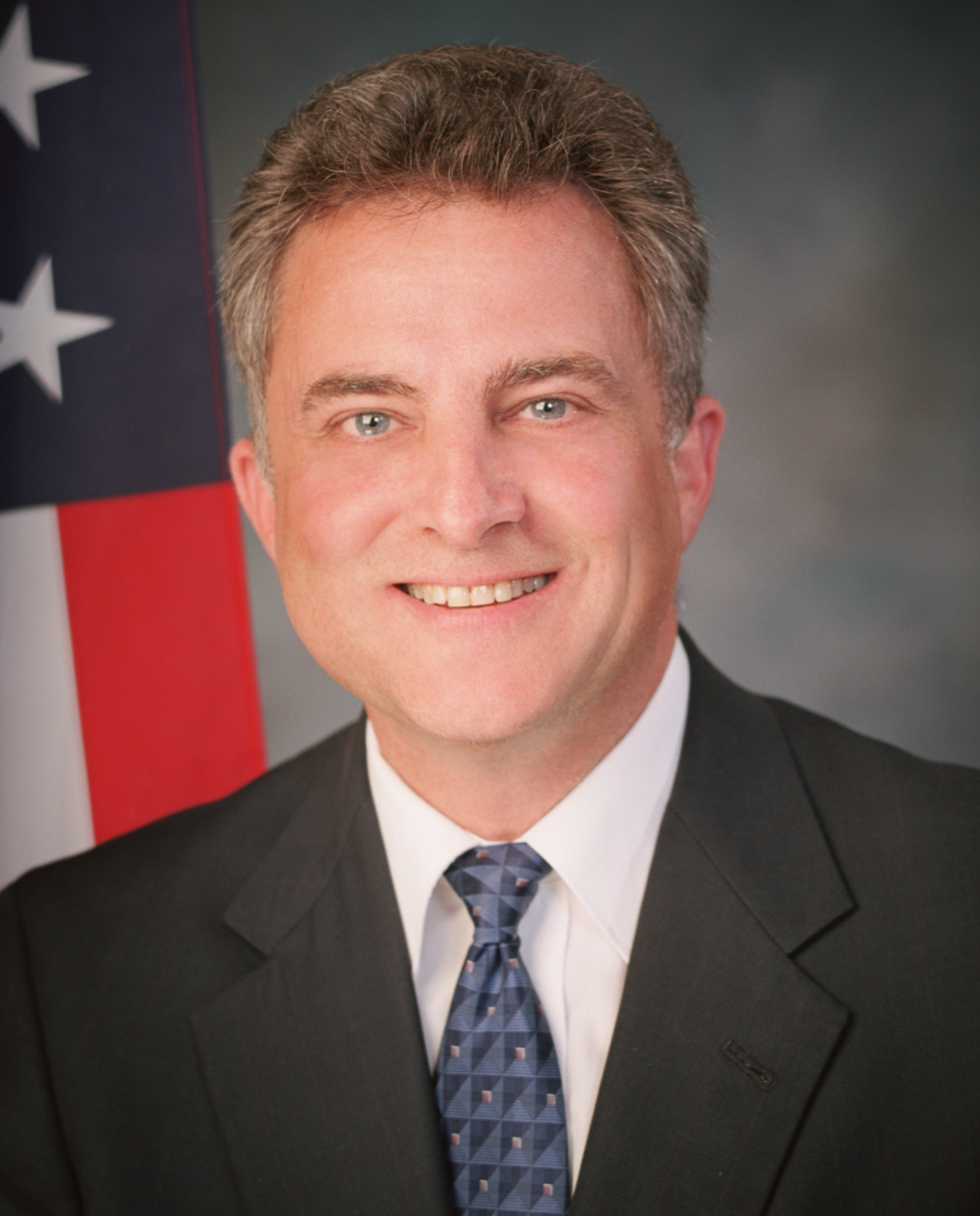

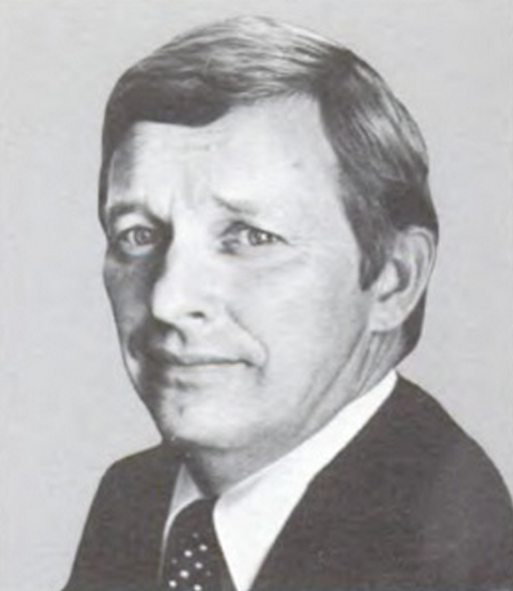
Nominee	Joe Maxwell	Wendell Bailey
Party	Democratic	Republican
Popular vote	1,201,959	1,014,446
Percentage	52.1%	44.0%
- County results Maxwell: 40–50% 50–60% 60–70% 70–80% Bailey: 40–50% 50–60% 60–70% 70–80%
Lieutenant Governor before election
Roger B. Wilson
Democratic
Elected Lieutenant Governor
Joe Maxwell
Democratic

The 2000 Missouri lieutenant gubernatorial election was held on November 7, 2000. Democratic nominee Joe Maxwell defeated Republican nominee Wendell Bailey with 52.14% of the vote. As of 2025, this remains the last time a Democrat was elected Lieutenant Governor of Missouri.

== Primary elections ==
Primary elections were held on August 8, 2000.

=== Democratic primary ===
==== Candidates ====
- Joe Maxwell, State Senator
- Gracia Yancey Backer, State Representative
- Catherine Powell

==== Results ====
Democratic primary results
Party	Candidate	Votes	%
Democratic	Joe Maxwell	219,955	56.11
Democratic	Gracia Yancey Backer	94,540	24.12
Democratic	Catherine Powell	77,545	19.78
Total votes		392,040	100.00

=== Republican primary ===
==== Candidates ====
- Wendell Bailey, former State Treasurer of Missouri
- Joe Ortwerth, County executive of St. Charles County

==== Results ====
Republican primary results
Party	Candidate	Votes	%
Republican	Wendell Bailey	193,062	57.19
Republican	Joe Ortwerth	144,503	42.81
Total votes		337,565	100.00

== General election ==
=== Candidates ===
Major party candidates

- Joe Maxwell, Democratic
- Wendell Bailey, Republican

Other candidates

- Phillip W. Horras, Libertarian
- Patricia A. Griffard, Natural Law
- George D. Weber, Reform
- Ben Kjelshus, Green
- Bob Wells, Constitution

=== Results ===
2000 Missouri lieutenant gubernatorial election
Party	Candidate	Votes	%	±%
Democratic	Joe Maxwell	1,201,959	52.14%	
Republican	Wendell Bailey	1,014,446	44.01%	
Libertarian	Phillip W. Horras	20,345	0.88%	
Natural Law	Patricia A. Griffard	18,244	0.79%	
Reform	George D. Weber	17,859	0.78%	
Green	Ben Kjelshus	16,738	0.73%	
Constitution	Bob Wells	15,681	0.68%	
Majority		187,513		
Turnout		2,305,288		
Democratic hold		Swing		
