= 1999 Missouri Proposition B =

Proposition B
- April 6, 1999
- Concealed Carry Proposition

Results
Choice	Votes	%
Yes	634,361	48.33%
No	678,256	51.67%
County results
Yes
50–60%
60–70%
70–80%
80–90%
No
50–60%
60–70%
70–80%

Proposition B in Missouri was a failed 1999 ballot measure that would have required local police authorities to issue concealed weapons permits to eligible citizens. It was a contentious issue and was narrowly rejected at the time by the electorate, but the legislature later approved similar legislation in 2003.

== Supporters ==
Support for concealed carry laws in Missouri grew gradually throughout the 1990s. In 1991, a group to promote such laws called "the conference" was formed and that nickname was used until the Missouri Legislative Issues Council (MOLIC) was formed in 1995 for official recognition. Support for these laws increased in part as a response to the Brady Handgun Violence Prevention Act and other national gun control efforts.

After author/columnist John Ross made his attempts to convince Missouri legislators, other supporters also emerged. The National Rifle Association of America (NRA) formed Missourians Against Crime (MAC) in 1998 as their spokesman into Missouri. This created an issue with the MOLIC membership. Negative campaigns seldom succeed in Missouri. The MOLIC organization was transformed into Missourians for Personal Safety(MPS) for the 1998 Proposition B campaign with Steve McGhee as the President. These combined efforts brought notoriety to Greg Jeffery, attorney/author Kevin Jamison, and Tim Oliver, to the forefront of their local/regional news media. As the Missouri Sport Shooting Association (MSSA), joined (unofficially) in support, they all proceeded with their regional campaigning attempts. Eventually, more and more individuals heard of these volunteers/members and took up the task to support the proposition with smaller meetings and neighborhood 'grass roots' action groups.

Police Officers generally supported the measure: "In a recent poll, more than eighty-five percent of our 1352 members favored Right-to-Carry.", Letter to St. Louis Police Chief Ron Henderson, from Sgt. John J. Johnson, President St. Louis Police Officers Association, 1/23/99."

The Gateway Civil Liberties Alliance (GCLA) arose after the failure to pass the proposition in 1999; forming itself from MOLIC, MPS, and with WMSA giving support, to become the leadership and legislative clearing house for the 2003 success in passing a shall-issue law. Frequent trips to Jefferson City by Greg Jeffery (GCLA cofounder) earned him the nickname 'braintrust' to a newly created law that was adopted by Missouri in 2003.

== Opponents ==
Handgun Control, Inc., saw this as their test case before the elections in 2000 to exercise their political influence and lobbied hard to defeat the referendum. Political notables included the Clinton/Gore Administration with Attorney General Janet Reno playing a secondary role to Hillary Clinton's activism, Governor Mel Carnahan and his daughter Robin Carnahan, the 1994 appointed Secretary of State, Rebecca Cook, and State Auditor, Claire McCaskill.

Robin Carnahan chaired the Safe Schools and Workplaces Committee (SSWC) and orchestrated television ads against the proposition. Also, on the weekend prior to voting day, that organization coordinated the taped phone message from Hillary Clinton to automatically dial 75,000 homes statewide with the message, "just too dangerous for Missouri families."

== Ballot language ==
The General Assembly approved the following ballot language:

Shall state or local law enforcement agencies be authorized to issue permits to law-abiding citizens at least twenty-one years of age to carry concealed firearms outside their home for personal protection after having passed a state and federal criminal background check and having completed a firearms safety training course approved by the Missouri Department of Public Safety?

After a lawsuit filed by the opponents of the measure, the language was changed. The final text read:

"Shall sheriffs, or in the case of St. Louis County, the chief of police, be required to issue permits to carry concealed firearms to citizens who apply if various statutory requirements are satisfied?" Because of the discretion given to local law enforcement to verify the accuracy of applications, the costs are uncertain. Application fees are estimated to cover most costs for the first three years. Subsequently, local governments, as a whole, may incur costs from $500,000 to $1,000,000 annually, not covered by fees.

Missouri Sport Shooting Association President Kevin Jamison described it as, "The opposition conducted a poll of the ballot language which determined that 60% of the state would vote in favor of License to Carry. Outraged that the people might "speak wrong", the Governor's lawyer filed a suit with the Missouri Supreme Court to change the ballot language. The defendants in the suit were Attorney General Jay Nixon and State Auditor Claire McCaskill."

== Campaign controversies ==
The use of official government resources by opponents of the measure was controversial.

Missouri's two US Attorneys are using the Justice Department's name and facilities to lobby against the state's concealed weapons ballot issue. Using official department letterhead, the attorneys, Edward Dowd and Stephen Hill, urged sheriffs and police chiefs across the state to rally resistance against Proposition B, which is on the ballot this April. Dowd's office is operating an 800 number which people can call to obtain anti-prop B campaigning materials. Calls to the 800 number, 1-800-214-2690, are answered with "US Attorneys Office."

Some advertisements used in the campaign were deceptive, particularly an opposition ad that implied Missourians would be allowed to carry Uzis that continued into 2000.

== Results ==
Proposition B gained 634,361 votes in favor (48.3%) and 678,256 votes against (51.7%), thus being defeated by a margin of 3.3%.

The majority of voters in rural Missouri voted in favor of Proposition B. However, urban voters, particularly in St. Louis and Kansas City, tipped the balance against Proposition B. 74.1% of the voters in the city of St. Louis, 69.5% in St. Louis County, and 71.6% in Kansas City opposed Proposition B.

In 2003, the Missouri General Assembly passed new laws to enable shall-issue permits.

== Participant roles during 1999 ==
The following persons played important roles in the creation of law in the State of Missouri. This is not their biography but an outline of the positions held during the 1999 Proposition B campaigns.

=== John Ross ===
Pro-2nd Amendment activist.

John Ross Author/Columnist

Concealed Firearms Instructor

1998 Chairman/Co-founder; Missouri Legislative Issues Council (MOLIC).

Co-founder; Missourians for Personal Safety (MPS)

Supporter, Missouri Sport Shooting Association (MSSA)

=== Kevin Jamison ===
Pro-2nd Amendment activist.

Attorney/Author

Co-founder; Missouri Legislative Issues Council (MOLIC)

Co-founder; Missourians for Personal Safety (MPS)

2006 President, Missouri Sport Shooting Association (MSSA)

=== Tim Oliver ===
Pro-2nd Amendment activist.

Conceal Carry Firearms Instructor

Co-founder; Missouri Legislative Issues Council (MOLIC)

Co-founder; Missourians for Personal Safety (MPS)

Supporter; Missouri Sport Shooting Association (MSSA)

=== Greg Jeffery ===
Pro-2nd Amendment activist.

Co-founder; Missouri Legislative Issues Council (MOLIC)

Co-founder; Missourians for Personal Safety (MPS)

Supporter, Missouri Sport Shooting Association (MSSA)

Co-founder The Gateway Civil Liberties Alliance (GCLA)

Legislative Consultant to Missouri Lawmakers.

=== Steve McGhee ===
Pro-2nd Amendment activist.

NRA Master Training Counselor/Instructor

1998 President, Missouri Sport Shooting Association (MSSA)

1999 President/Co-founder; Missourians for Personal Safety (MPS)

=== Campaign Funding ===
Pro-2nd Amendment
NRA	+$3 Million

Pro-Gun Control
Out of State	$399,079
In State	$164,000

=== Carnahan Participation ===
Pro-Gun Control activist. Governor Mel Carnahan pledged neutrality.

Robin Carnahan chaired the Safe Schools and Workplaces Committee (SSWC)

=== 1999 Federal Participation ===
Pro-Gun Control activist.

US Attorneys: (established 1-800-214-2690)

Edward Dowd (Eastern Missouri)
Stephen Hill (Western Missouri)

=== 1999 White House Participation ===
Pro-Gun Control & Brady Handgun Violence Prevention Act activist.

President Clinton signed Federal assault weapons ban in 1993 which expired in 2004.

Hillary Clinton gave a taped voice message to condemn Prop B.

== See also ==
- Gun politics in the United States
- Coalition to Stop Gun Violence
- Americans for Gun Safety Foundation
- Tides Center aka Tides Foundation
- Second Amendment to the United States Constitution
