= 1988 Missouri lieutenant gubernatorial election =

- November 8, 1988
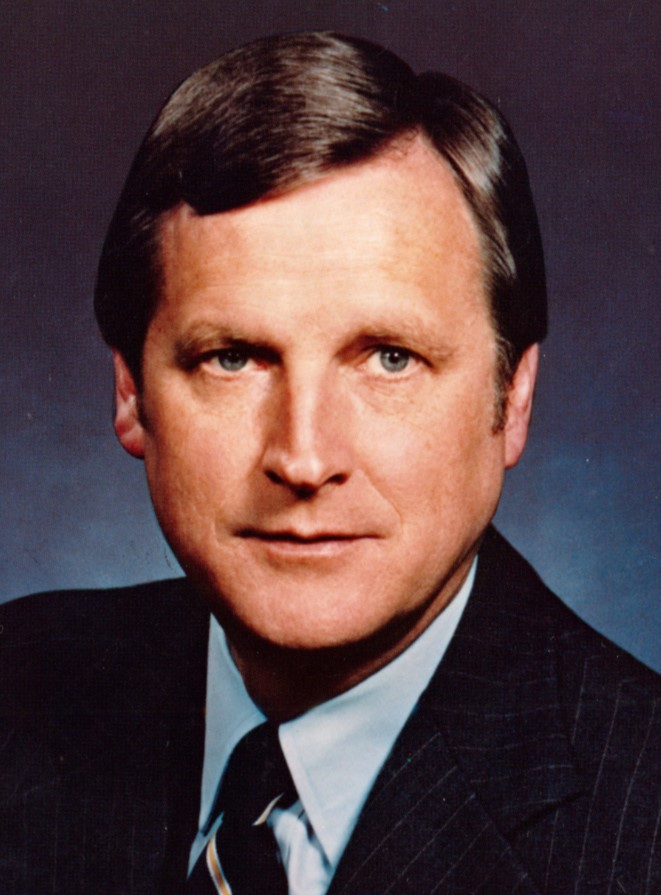

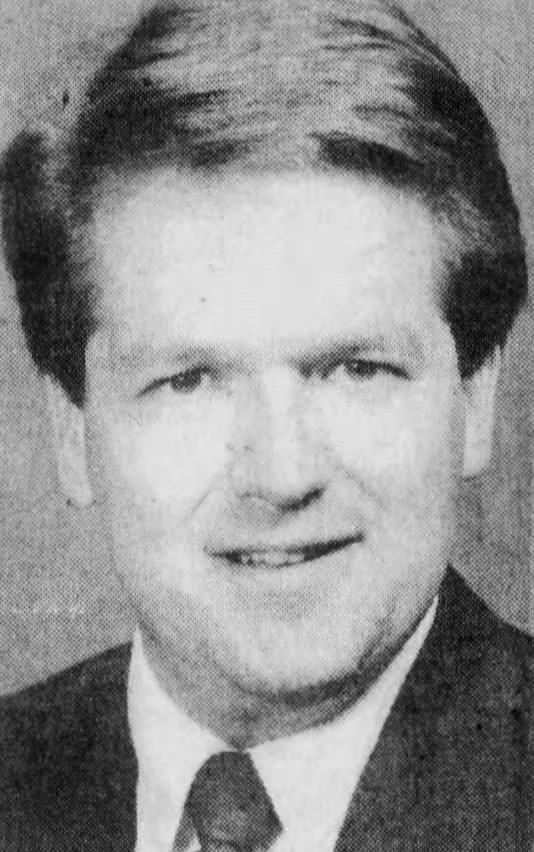
| Nominee | Mel Carnahan | Richard B. "R.B." Grisham |
| Party | Democratic | Republican |
| Popular vote | 1,054,307 | 957,698 |
| Percentage | 51.8% | 47.1% |
- County results Carnahan: 40–50% 50–60% 60–70% 70–80% Grisham: 40–50% 50–60% 60–70%
Lieutenant Governor before election
Harriett Woods
Democratic
Elected Lieutenant Governor
Mel Carnahan
Democratic

The 1988 Missouri lieutenant gubernatorial election was held on November 8, 1988. Democratic nominee Mel Carnahan defeated Republican nominee Richard B. "R.B." Grisham with 51.81% of the vote.

== Primary elections ==
Primary elections were held on August 2, 1988.

=== Democratic primary ===
==== Candidates ====
- Mel Carnahan, State Treasurer of Missouri
- Bill Kimmons
- Steven Jacques
- Prentess E. Clifton Sr.

==== Results ====
Democratic primary results
| Party | Candidate | Votes | % |
|---|---|---|---|
| Democratic | Mel Carnahan | 262,239 | 62.02 |
| Democratic | Bill Kimmons | 73,042 | 17.27 |
| Democratic | Steven Jacques | 48,386 | 11.44 |
| Democratic | Prentess E. Clifton Sr. | 39,178 | 9.27 |
| Total votes | | 422,845 | 100.00 |

=== Republican primary ===
==== Candidates ====
- Richard B. "R.B." Grisham, State Representative
- Derek Holland, State Representative
- James A. "Jim" Noland Jr., former State Senator
- Dick Baalmann
- Gordon W. Neilson

==== Results ====
Republican primary results
| Party | Candidate | Votes | % |
|---|---|---|---|
| Republican | Richard B. "R.B." Grisham | 81,963 | 28.23 |
| Republican | Derek Holland | 71,960 | 24.78 |
| Republican | James A. "Jim" Noland Jr. | 64,184 | 22.11 |
| Republican | Dick Baalmann | 54,445 | 18.75 |
| Republican | Gordon W. Neilson | 17,801 | 6.13 |
| Total votes | | 290,353 | 100.00 |

== General election ==
=== Candidates ===
Major party candidates

- Mel Carnahan, Democratic
- Richard B. "R.B." Grisham, Republican

Other candidates

- Richard Rosenberg, Libertarian

=== Results ===
1988 Missouri lieutenant gubernatorial election
| Party | Candidate | Votes | % | ±% |
|---|---|---|---|---|
| Democratic | Mel Carnahan | 1,054,307 | 51.81% | |
| Republican | Richard B. "R.B." Grisham | 957,698 | 47.06% | |
| Libertarian | Richard Rosenberg | 22,992 | 1.13% | |
| Majority | | 96,609 | | |
| Turnout | | | | |
| Democratic hold | | Swing | | |
