= Joe Maxwell =

American politician (born 1957)

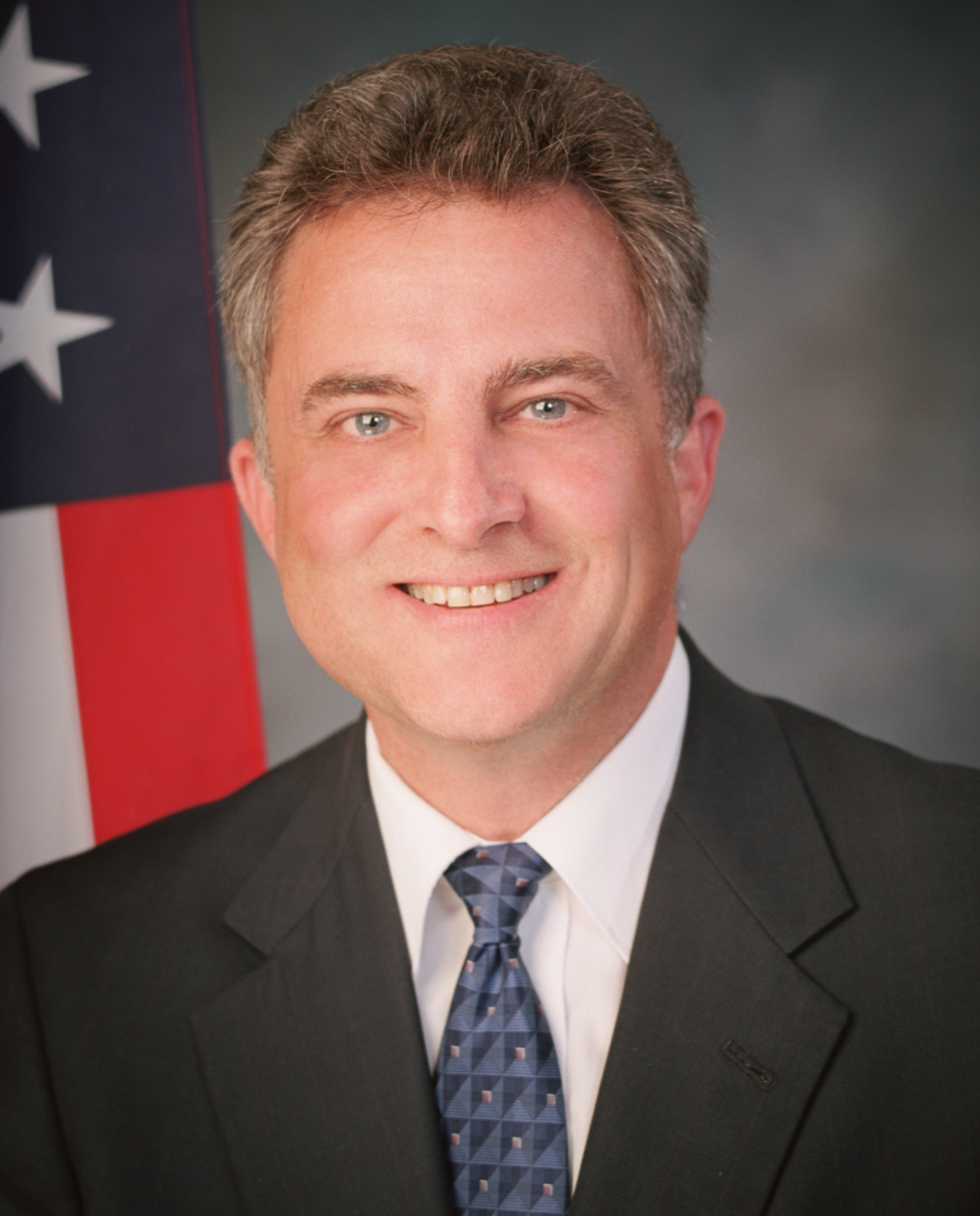

45th Lieutenant Governor of Missouri
- In office November 15, 2000 – January 10, 2005
- Governor: Roger Wilson (2000–01); Bob Holden (2001–05)
- Preceded by: Roger Wilson
- Succeeded by: Peter Kinder

Member of the Missouri Senate from the 18th district
- In office January 4, 1995 – November 15, 2000
- Preceded by: Norman Merrell
- Succeeded by: John W. Cauthorn

Member of the Missouri House of Representatives
- In office January 1991 – January 4, 1995
- Preceded by: Ray Hamlett
- Succeeded by: Ted Farnen
- Constituency: 15th district (1991–93); 21st district (1993–95)

Personal details
- Born: Joseph Edwin Maxwell; March 17, 1957 (age 69) Kirksville, Missouri, U.S.
- Party: Democratic
- Education: University of Missouri (BS, JD)
- Website: Archived government website

Joseph Edwin Maxwell (born March 17, 1957) is an American attorney who served as the 45th Lieutenant Governor of the state of Missouri. He is a Democrat who also served in the Missouri House of Representatives and the Missouri Senate. To date, he is the last member of the Democratic Party to be elected Lieutenant Governor of Missouri.

== Personal history ==
Joseph Edwin Maxwell was born in Kirksville, Missouri and grew up on a farm near Rush Hill in rural Audrain County, Missouri. He is a graduate of Community R-VI High School in Laddonia and received his higher education at the University of Missouri. Maxwell earned a Bachelor of Science in Education from Mizzou in 1986, and his Juris Doctor from the University of Missouri School of Law in 1990. Prior to receiving his higher education, Maxwell worked as a rural mail carrier for the U.S Postal Service and also operated a small business with his twin brother. Joe Maxwell is a military veteran who retired in 1995 with the rank of First Sergeant after twenty years in the Missouri National Guard. Maxwell and wife Sarah are the parents of three daughters. He later became an attorney in private practice in Mexico, Missouri with the firm of Hagan, Hamlett and Maxwell and Council Member of Missourians for a Balanced Energy Future.

== Political history ==
Joe Maxwell served two terms in the Missouri House of Representatives, being elected in 1990 and again in 1992. In 1994 Maxwell ran for and won election to the Missouri Senate representing the 18th District. He easily defeated Republican challenger James Lemon in 1998 to win reelection. Joe Maxwell was elected to statewide office in 2000, defeating Republican Wendell Bailey in the race for Missouri Lieutenant Governor. After his election, he resigned from his senate seat to take office early. He chose not to run for the office again in 2004, citing his wife's health problems. In 2016, Maxwell, a Democrat, endorsed Republican Eric Greitens for Governor. Maxwell had been dissatisfied with Democratic nominee Chris Koster's stances on Agriculture, almost deciding to challenge him for the nomination.

Missouri 18th District State Senate Election 1998
Party	Candidate	Votes	%	±%
Republican	James Lemon	2,602		
Democratic	Joe Maxwell (incumbent)	20,586		Winner

Missouri Lieutenant Governor Election 2000
Party	Candidate	Votes	%	±%
Republican	Wendell Bailey	1,014,446	44%	
Democratic	Joe Maxwell	1,201,959	52.1%	Winner

Party political offices
Preceded by Roger B. Wilson	Democratic nominee for Lieutenant Governor of Missouri; 2000	Succeeded by Bekki Cook
Political offices
Preceded by Roger Wilson	Lieutenant Governor of Missouri; 2000–2005	Succeeded by Peter Kinder
