= John Ross (author) =

American author (1957–2022)

John Franklin Ross
- Born: June 17, 1957
- Died: April 29, 2022 (aged 64)
- Education: Amherst College
- Writing career
- Notable work: Unintended Consequences

John Franklin Ross (June 17, 1957 – April 29, 2022) was an American gun rights activist. He is author of the popular underground novel Unintended Consequences, and wrote a regular column on the Internet. He was a Democratic candidate for US Congress in 1998 in Missouri's 2nd congressional district.

== Early life ==
John Franklin Ross was born in St. Louis, Missouri, the son of Walter Ross and Lucianna Gladney Ross. His grandfather was Frank Y. Gladney, a prominent attorney and businessman in St. Louis. He graduated from John Burroughs School in Ladue in 1974 and from Amherst College in 1979 with a BA in English. He subsequently worked for E.F. Hutton as an investment broker, before leaving the financial industry to concentrate on being a full-time writer.

== Unintended Consequences ==
Unintended Consequences is a controversial novel that mixes real events with fiction. These events portray a continuing oppression of the American gun culture that the author believes has occurred since the passage of the National Firearms Act of 1934, which made it a federal offense to possess a machine gun, short-barreled rifle, short-barreled shotgun, or silencer without first paying a $200 fee to the United States Treasury.

The cover of the book shows a woman dressed as Lady Justice being menaced by a heavily armed agent of the ATF; it contains several scenes of graphic sex and violence. The book has been repeatedly confiscated in Canada by customs officials. The publisher no longer ships copies of the book to Canada as a result.

Its thesis, as discussed in the Author's Note - A Warning and Disclaimer, is that hostile bullying by a government will cause a revolt, and the revolt will be successful if the area involved is large enough, the area has a sufficiently distinct culture, and the rebels use low-tech leaderless resistance. It has sold briskly at gun shows but is generally not sold at traditional bookstores. (As of June 2009, the price for a new copy hovers around $120 and even used ones are priced at over $50 on auction sites because the publisher is almost sold out.)

In 2000, Ross had his lawyer write a letter to the ATF claiming that their agents harassed him for writing his book, threatened vendors for selling his book and approached his "amicably separated" wife to elicit information against him.

== Other activities and personal life ==
Ross supported a Concealed Carry law passed in Missouri in 2003.

He was the Democratic candidate for U.S. Congress in 1998 in Missouri's 2nd congressional district, billing himself as a "Pre-Roosevelt Democrat," which, as he defined it, was "a Democrat without the Socialism." He received 28.3% of the vote, losing to Republican incumbent James Talent.

In 2000, Ross appeared under his own name in the independent film Defiance, where he played the part of a gun dealer in a small western town in 1876.

In October 2000, he had a stroke and was incapacitated for a few weeks. He made a complete recovery and lived in St. Louis, where he wrote, did investment consulting, scheduled fee-based speaking engagements, and ran night classes for Concealed Weapons licensing.

Ross wrote a semi-regular Internet column called "Ross In Range," where he discussed topics that interested him. A recurring theme is understanding and coping with women.
