= B. J. Marsh =

American politician (1940–2020)

Member of the Missouri House of Representatives from the 136th district
- In office January 2001 – January 2009
- Preceded by: Mike Schilling
- Succeeded by: Eric Burlison
- In office January 1989 – January 1993
- Preceded by: Bob Holden
- Succeeded by: Mike Schilling

Personal details
- Born: February 21, 1940 Pennsboro, Missouri, U.S.
- Died: December 24, 2020 (aged 80) Springfield, Missouri, U.S.
- Party: Republican
- Profession: Businessman

B. J. Marsh (February 21, 1940 – December 24, 2020) was an American politician from Missouri.

He was a member of the Missouri House of Representatives, serving from 1988 to 1992 and from 2000 to 2008. Marsh was a member of the Republican Party. Marsh graduated from Weaver Airline Personnel School in 1960, and then he attended Southwest Missouri State University. He was the owner of Marsh Travel Agency and Motorcoach Tours and the commissioner of Missouri Tourism Commission in 2003.

Marsh died from complications of COVID-19 in Springfield, Missouri, on December 24, 2020, at age 80, amidst the COVID-19 pandemic in Missouri.
