= Gracia Yancey Backer =

American politician

Member of the Missouri House of Representatives from the 20th district
- In office January 6, 1993 – January 3, 2001
- Preceded by: Ted House
- Succeeded by: Danielle Moore

Member of the Missouri House of Representatives from the 23rd district
- In office January 5, 1983 – January 6, 1993
- Preceded by: James D. Tindall Sr.
- Succeeded by: Chris Kelly

Personal details
- Born: January 25, 1950 (age 76) Jefferson City, Missouri
- Party: Democratic

Gracia Yancey Backer (born January 25, 1950) is an American politician who served in the Missouri House of Representatives from 1983 to 2001. She graduated from William Woods College.
