= Carnahan Courthouse =

Coordinates: 38°37′36″N 90°11′52″W

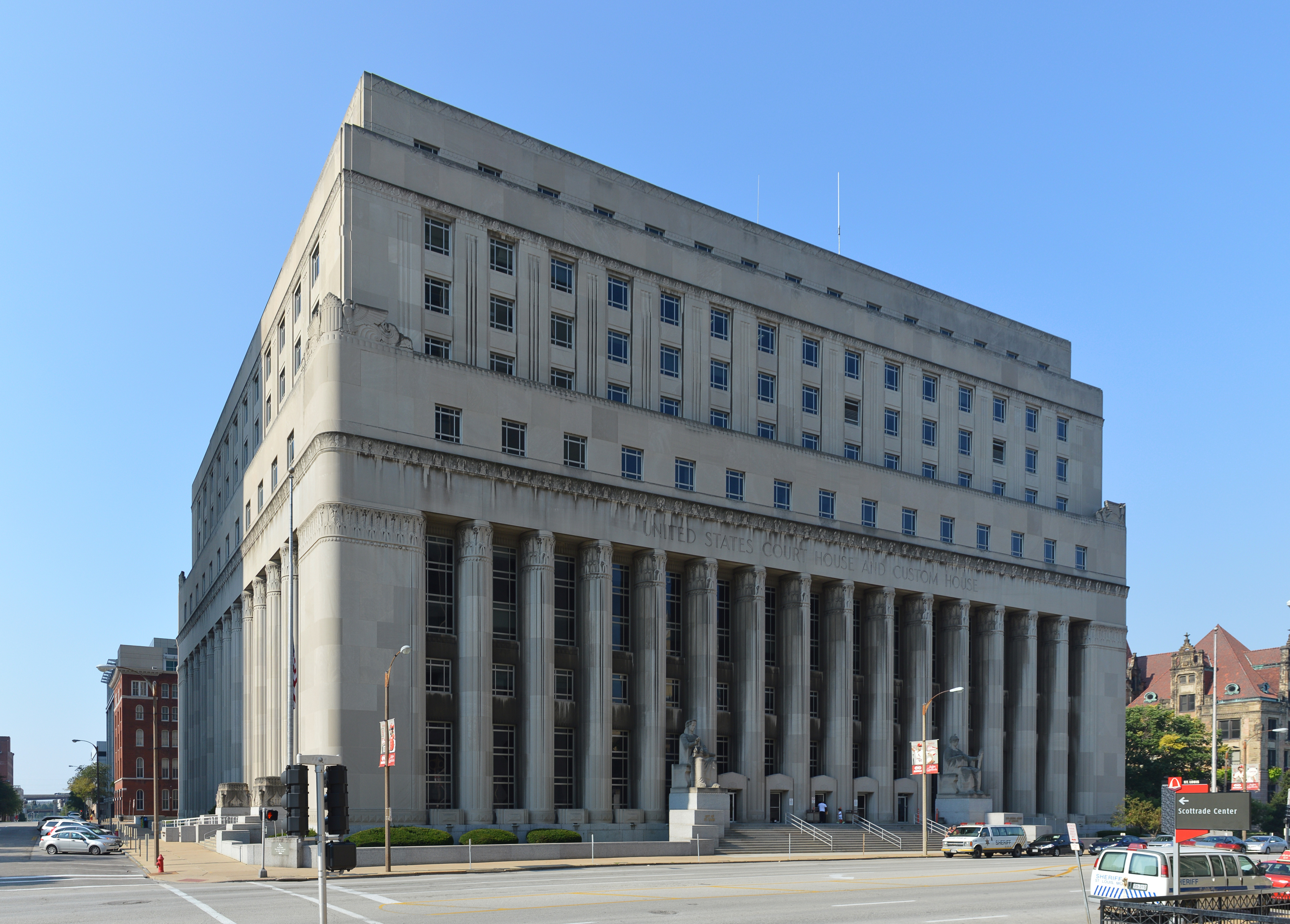
Mel Carnahan Courthouse, formerly the US Court House and Custom House

The Carnahan Courthouse, originally the U.S. Court House and Custom House, is a former federal courthouse in St. Louis, Missouri. Its namesake is former Missouri governor Mel Carnahan. The architectural partnership of Mauran, Russell & Crowell designed the building which was completed in 1935 at 1114 Market Street at the corner of Market Street and South Tucker Boulevard

The United States District Court for the Eastern District of Missouri met at this building until 2001, and the United States Court of Appeals for the Eighth Circuit met here until 2000. The building now provides office space and facilities for the Twenty-Second Judicial Circuit Court of Missouri, the City of St. Louis Sheriff's Department, the St. Louis Circuit Attorney, the St. Louis Circuit Clerk, the St. Louis Public Defender, and other city departments. The Carnahan Courthouse is featured on many of Saint Louis's Architectural tours, because of its notable columns.
