= Leopard skin =

Leopard skin may refer to:

- Leopard skin (clothing in Ancient Egypt)
- The skin of a leopard
- Animal print, a clothing and fashion style
- A specific skin change associated with onchocerciasis.
