= Norman Merrell =

American politician (1924–1994)

Member of the Missouri Senate from the 18th district
- In office January 6, 1971 – June 14, 1994
- Preceded by: Richard Southern
- Succeeded by: Joe Maxwell

Personal details
- Born: April 12, 1924 Williamstown, Missouri
- Died: June 14, 1994 (aged 70) Minneapolis, Minnesota
- Party: Democratic

Norman Merrell (April 12, 1924 – June 14, 1994) was an American politician who served in the Missouri Senate from the 18th district from 1971 until his death in 1994.

He died of cancer on June 14, 1994, in Minneapolis, Minnesota at age 70.
