= Wendell Bailey =

American politician (born 1940)

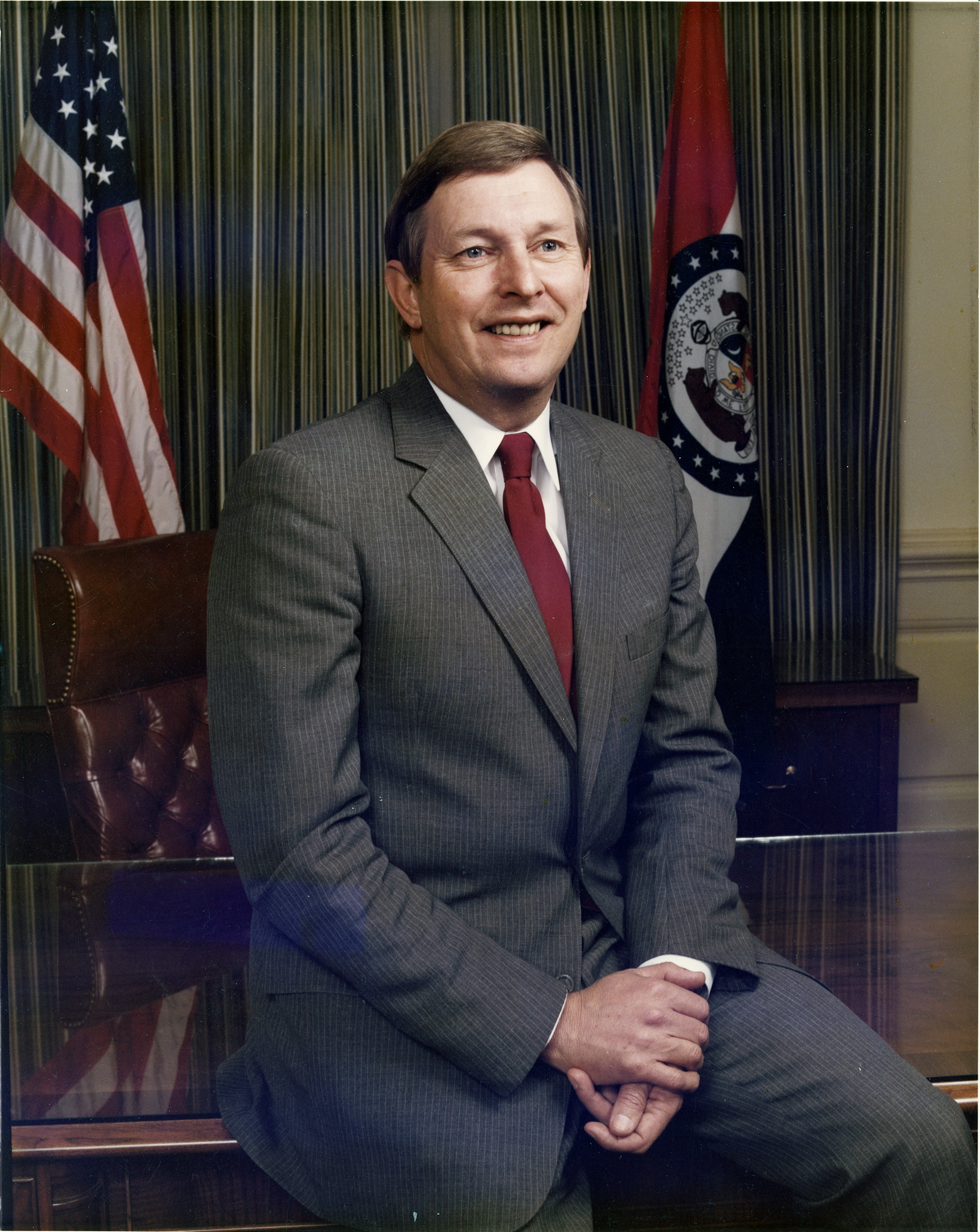
- Bailey, c. 1985

41st Treasurer of Missouri
- In office January 14, 1985 – January 11, 1993
- Governor: John Ashcroft
- Preceded by: Mel Carnahan
- Succeeded by: Bob Holden

Member of the U.S. House of Representatives from Missouri's 8th district
- In office January 3, 1981 – January 3, 1983
- Preceded by: Richard H. Ichord, Jr.
- Succeeded by: Bill Emerson

Member of the Missouri House of Representatives from the 152nd district
- In office January 3, 1973 – January 3, 1981
- Preceded by: O. L. Wallis
- Succeeded by: Travis Morrison

Personal details
- Born: Robert Wendell Bailey; July 30, 1940 (age 85) Willow Springs, Missouri, U.S.
- Party: Republican
- Education: Missouri State University (BS)

Robert Wendell Bailey (born July 30, 1940) is an American politician from Missouri. He graduated from Southwest Missouri State University, where he was a member of Tau Kappa Epsilon fraternity, with a degree in Business Administration and owned an automobile dealership in Willow Springs.

Bailey was named after Wendell Willkie, the Republican presidential nominee for the 1940 election.

After serving as mayor of his native Willow Springs, Bailey was elected to the Missouri House of Representatives in 1972 and re-elected in 1974, 1976, and 1978. In 1980, Bailey was elected to the United States House of Representatives, but after the 1980 census Missouri lost one congressional district, and Bailey's 8th District was eliminated. The bulk of his district was merged with the neighboring 4th district of two-term Democrat Ike Skelton. Although Bailey lost, he held Skelton to 54 percent of the vote, which was notable considering Skelton retained 60 percent of his former territory.

In 1984 Bailey made a comeback and was elected Missouri State Treasurer; he was narrowly re-elected to this office in 1988 over future Missouri Governor Bob Holden. In 1992 Bailey made an unsuccessful bid for Governor of Missouri, finishing third in the Republican primary behind then-Attorney General William L. Webster (who won the nomination) and then-Secretary of State Roy Blunt. Bailey cast himself as the only pro-choice candidate in the 1992 GOP governor's primary, whereas Webster and Blunt were both clearly anti-abortion.

Bailey narrowly lost the Republican primary for a seat in the Missouri Senate in 1996, but in 2000 Bailey captured the Republican nomination for lieutenant governor, although he was defeated by Democrat Joe Maxwell in the general election. In 2006, the St. Louis Post-Dispatch reported that Bailey was working in the Kansas City, Missouri office of the Small Business Administration as a regional advocate representing Missouri and neighboring states Iowa, Kansas, and Nebraska.

U.S. House of Representatives
| Preceded by Richard Howard Ichord Jr. | Member of the U.S. House of Representatives from Missouri's 8th congressional district 1981–1983 | Succeeded by Bill Emerson |
Political offices
| Preceded by Mel Carnahan | Treasurer of Missouri; 1985–1993 | Succeeded by Bob Holden |
Party political offices
| Preceded by Al Kemp | Republican nominee for Treasurer of Missouri; 1984, 1988 | Succeeded by Gary Melton |
| Preceded by Bill Kenney | Republican nominee for Lieutenant Governor of Missouri; 2000 | Succeeded by Peter Kinder |
U.S. order of precedence (ceremonial)
| Preceded by James B. Longley Jr. as Former U.S. Representative | Order of precedence of the United States as Former U.S. Representative | Succeeded by Joan Kelly Horn as Former U.S. Representative |
