= Bob Holden =

American politician (born 1949)

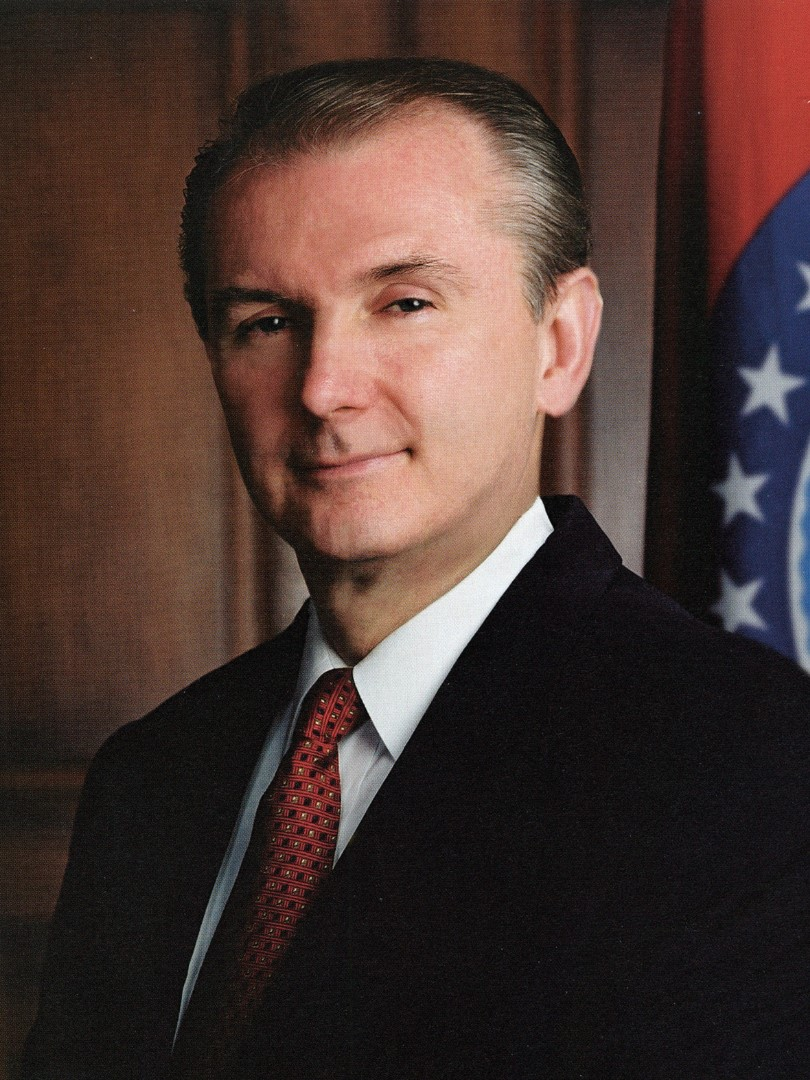
- Official portrait, 2001

53rd Governor of Missouri
- In office January 8, 2001 – January 10, 2005
- Lieutenant: Joe Maxwell
- Preceded by: Roger B. Wilson
- Succeeded by: Matt Blunt

42nd Treasurer of Missouri
- In office January 11, 1993 – January 8, 2001
- Governor: Mel Carnahan; Roger B. Wilson
- Preceded by: Wendell Bailey
- Succeeded by: Nancy Farmer

Member of the Missouri House of Representatives from the 136th district
- In office January 1983 – January 1989
- Preceded by: Robert Young
- Succeeded by: B. J. Marsh

Personal details
- Born: Robert Lee Holden Jr. August 24, 1949 (age 77) Kansas City, Missouri, U.S.
- Party: Democratic
- Spouse: Lori Hauser
- Children: 2
- Education: Missouri State University (BA)
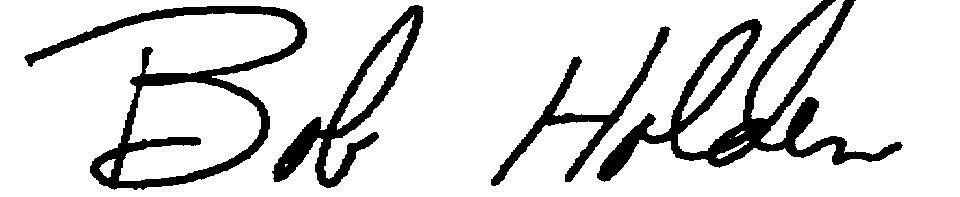
- Signature

Robert Lee Holden Jr. (born August 24, 1949) is an American politician who served as the 53rd governor of Missouri from 2001 to 2005. A member of the Democratic Party, he previously served as the Missouri state treasurer from 1993 to 2001 and represented the 136th district in the Missouri House of Representatives from 1983 to 1989. Since leaving public office, Holden has worked at Webster University, where he founded the Holden Public Policy Forum, and serves as the president and chairman of the United States Heartland China Association.

== Early life ==
Even though he was born in Kansas City, Missouri, on August 24, 1949, Holden was raised on a farm near Birch Tree. He attended a one-room school and earned his bachelor's degree in political science at Missouri State University (then known as Southwest Missouri State), where he was a member of the Alpha Phi Omega service fraternity. He also attended the John F. Kennedy School of Government at Harvard University, where he took courses specifically tailored for government executives. Holden met his wife Lori Hauser during his first campaign for the Missouri General Assembly and together, they have two boys, Robert and John D.

His brother, Calvin Ray Holden, is a Greene County Circuit Court judge.

== Early political career ==
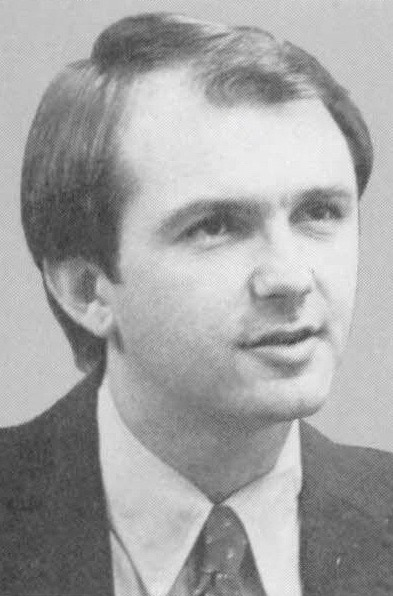
Holden during his tenure as a state representative

From 1975 to 1981, Holden worked in the office of State Treasurer James Spainhower, and worked on Spainhower's 1980 campaign for governor. From 1983 to 1989, Holden was a member of the Missouri House of Representatives. During his tenure, he became chair of the appropriations committee.

In January of 1988, he announced his campaign for State Treasurer of Missouri against incumbent Republican Wendell Bailey. Holden's race was considered to be one of the few potentially competitive races for Democrats that year, and Bailey was seen as the most vulnerable Republican up that year. Holden lost by over 40,000 votes in a close contest. After this loss, Holden worked as the chief of staff to U.S. Congressman Dick Gephardt.

In 1992, Holden made another bid, and this time was successful. Holden served in the position from 1993 to 2001.

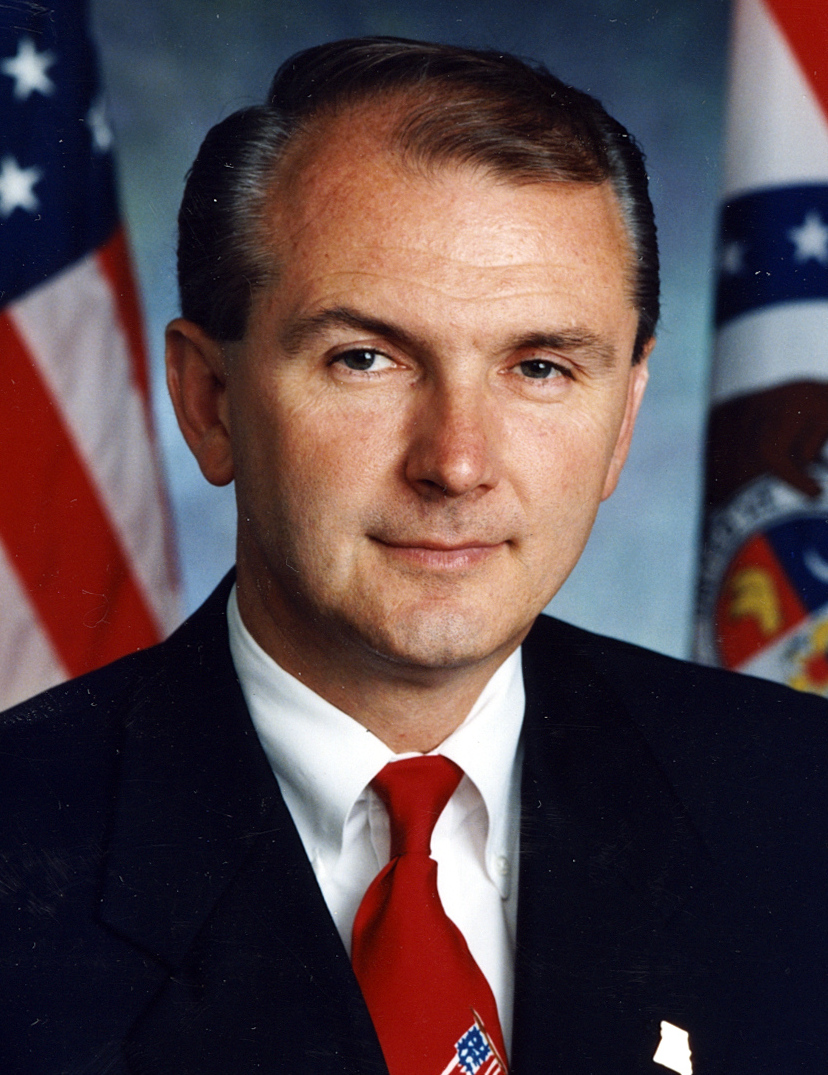
Holden as State Treasurer

== Governor of Missouri ==
In the 2000 election, Holden was expected to face a tough primary against Lieutenant Governor Roger B. Wilson. But in March of 1998, Wilson declined a bid, mostly to spend more time with family, but also due to fundraising troubles against Holden. Holden won the Democratic nomination and faced Republican Congressman Jim Talent in the general election. During the campaign, Talent attacked Holden as an establishment candidate, while Holden compared Talent to former House Speaker Newt Gingrich when commenting on Talent's proposals, saying "this isn't Washington".

Holden suffered from low name recognition early in the race, but by late October had begun leading Talent by several points in the polls. When voting began on November 7, Talent had an early lead. However, when votes from St. Louis came in around midnight, Holden took over the lead. At 2:35 a.m. on November 8, the Associated Press called the race for Holden, and Talent conceded shortly after. Holden's victory over Talent marked the closest election for Missouri governor since 1976 and the first election since 1924 in which neither candidate received a majority of the vote.

Holden was inaugurated as governor in January 2001. His inauguration was the most elaborate and expensive in state history. The ceremony cost $1 million, of which $125,000 was paid from state government funds. Months after, there was still a remaining debt of $417,000. Although Holden's inauguration ceremony received public financing equal to that of Missouri's previous two governors, a perception that the inauguration was overly extravagant emerged and became a theme in opposition to his administration.

Not long after his inauguration, Holden faced a challenge from the new legislature. In special elections held weeks after his inauguration, Republicans won control of the state senate. This made Holden the first governor since Phil Donnelly to face a divided legislature. However, in spite of this, Holden was able to get some legislative accomplishments. Later that year, when Holden called a special session, the legislature passed a bill, which created a new prescription drug benefit for seniors. But the relationship would grow more troubled, with Holden at one point having three vetoes overridden in a year, the same number of vetoes among all Missouri governors post-Civil War.

Holden was pro-gun, but due to some negative effects that he felt proposed legislation would have on Missouri gun owners, and due to the results of a 1999 referendum, he vetoed a concealed-carry bill passed by the Missouri General Assembly. This was short-lived because his veto was overridden by both the Missouri House of Representatives and Senate and the concealed-carry bill passed into law in 2003. Several Republican legislators who had initially voted against the bill, such as Michael Gibbons of Kirkwood, switched sides to override Holden's veto.

Holden's biggest challenge arguably was the economy and spending. At various times during his administration, Holden made drastic cuts in the state's budget. This included cuts, proposed and enacted, to Medicaid, to education, and to the state government. Not helping matters, the state oversaw some 77,000 job losses in key industries due to the national recession. Holden did generally favor greater spending on state elementary and secondary education, but faced problems with raising funds. and he called the state legislature back into session after they had recessed for the year to ask for more state funding for education via raising taxes on casinos, but they refused additional spending. While wanting to raise taxes to pay for various programs, the Republican-led state legislature stymied these attempts.

Holden was a member of the National Governors Association and was elected chair of the Midwestern Governors’ Conference which led the Midwestern states’ efforts to stimulate the economy by focusing on education and research. He also chaired the Governor's Ethanol Coalition and represented fellow governors on the National Medicaid Reform Task Force.

=== 2004 election ===
In March 2003, Holden announced his bid for re-election in 2004. He was challenged for the Democratic nomination for governor by a fellow Democrat, State Auditor Claire McCaskill, who had won the support of officials such as former governor Roger B. Wilson. McCaskill based her campaign on the broad-based disgruntlement with Holden that prompted even some Democrats to call him by the unflattering moniker "OTB" (One Term Bob). However, Holden still had some support among the state establishment, and prominent backers in U.S. House Minority Leader Dick Gephardt and former U.S. Senator Thomas Eagleton. After Holden's approval rating steadily dropped during the second half of his term, McCaskill defeated Holden in the Democratic primary, marking the first primary loss for a sitting governor since 1994 and the first loss for a sitting governor in Missouri's history.

McCaskill lost the November 2 general election to Republican Secretary of State Matt Blunt. Holden's term ended on January 10, 2005.

== Life after politics ==
Holden is currently the president and chairman of the United States Heartland China Association, the United States Heartland China Association (USHCA) is a 501(c)3 bipartisan organization committed to building stronger ties between the USHCA Region (21 states located in the US between the Great Lakes to the Gulf) and the People's Republic of China. Their focus is on trust building efforts connecting government officials; business leaders; educational and community interests with like-minded institutions between the heartland region and the People’s Republic of China.

Previously, Holden taught political science and communications courses at Webster University. Holden is the founder and director of the Holden Public Policy Forum at Webster University. The forum describes itself as "a bi-partisan speakers series that will bring Governors, Senators, presidential candidates and private sector public policy leaders to St. Louis and the Webster University Old Post Office campus."

In 2016, Holden was appointed to the executive committee of Missouri's statewide NAACP chapter.

Holden endorsed and campaigned on behalf of Vice President Joe Biden in the Democratic primaries of the 2020 United States presidential election. Holden had previously endorsed Senator Hillary Clinton in the Democratic primaries of the 2008 presidential campaign and served as a Missouri co-chair and a member of the Clinton campaign's education policy task force.

== Electoral history ==
2000 Missouri gubernatorial election
| Party | Candidate | Votes | % | ±% |
|---|---|---|---|---|
| Democratic | Bob Holden | 1,152,752 | 49.12 | ▼8.05 |
| Republican | Jim Talent | 1,131,307 | 48.21 | ▲7.78 |
| Independent | Larry Rice | 34,431 | 1.47 | N/A |
| Libertarian | John M. Swenson | 11,274 | 0.48 | ▼1.92 |
| Green | Lavoy (Zaki Baruti) Reed | 9,008 | 0.38 | N/A |
| Reform | Richard Kline | 4,916 | 0.21 | N/A |
| Constitution | Richard L. Smith | 3,142 | 0.13 | N/A |
| Total votes | | 2,346,830 | 100.00 | +0.07 |
| Democratic hold | | | | |

2004 Missouri gubernatorial election
| Party | Candidate | Votes | % |
|---|---|---|---|
| Democratic | Claire McCaskill | 437,780 | 51.64 |
| Democratic | Bob Holden (incumbent) | 383,734 | 45.27 |
| Democratic | Jim LePage | 16,761 | 1.98 |
| Democratic | Jeffery A. Emrick | 9,473 | 1.12 |
| Total votes | | 847,748 | 100 |

Party political offices
| Preceded by Tom Villa | Democratic nominee for Treasurer of Missouri; 1988, 1992, 1996 | Succeeded by Nancy Farmer |
| Preceded by Mel Carnahan | Democratic nominee for Governor of Missouri; 2000 | Succeeded by Claire McCaskill |
Political offices
| Preceded by Wendell Bailey | Treasurer of Missouri; 1993–2001 | Succeeded by Nancy Farmer |
| Preceded by Roger B. Wilson | Governor of Missouri; 2001–2005 | Succeeded by Matt Blunt |
U.S. order of precedence (ceremonial)
| Preceded by Roger B. Wilson as Former Governor | Order of precedence of the United States | Succeeded by Matt Blunt as Former Governor |
