= Professional wrestling in India =

Professional wrestling is a popular sport in India. The country has a rich history of professional wrestling and many professional wrestlers from India have worked around the world in various promotions. International wrestling promotions such as WWE and TNA generate high television viewership and have a significant fan following in India.

== History ==
In early 20th century Baksh Butt, known as The Great Gama, was a famous body builder, pehlwani wrestler and professional wrestler in India. Originally from Punjab, he began wrestling in 1895 at the age of 17 and won the world championship in 1910. He retired in 1929 after competing against opponents from India, Europe and the US. Other Indian wrestlers at this time included Raheem Bakhsh Sultani Wala, Jatindra Charan Guho and Tiger Daula.

Tiger Joginder Singh and Arjan Singh Das were the best professional wrestlers from India in their time, and worked in promotions in Singapore, Japan, USA in 1940s and 1950s.

Dara Singh was a notable Indian pro wrestler who won titles internationally. In the 1950s, he won the world championship against the world famous Emile Czaja, popularly known by his ring name King Kong. He also defeated world champion wrestler Lou Thesz of the US. Singh participated in almost 500 professional matches and remained undefeated in all of them, wrestling against George Gordienko of Canada, John da Silva of New Zealand and others. In 2018 WWE honoured Dara Singh by inducting him into the WWE Hall of Fame Legacy.

Gama Singh wrestled in the 1970s-1990s. (Note: Gadowar Singh Sahota better known by his ring name Gama Singh was born in India in 1954, his nephew Jinder Mahal is signed with WWE) He then moved to Canada and opened a wrestling training school.

Indian wrestler Sangram Singh was signed with South African promotion.

Star Sports and Ten Sports used to air matches from the TNA and WWE promotions respectively. (Note: Ten Sports was a foreign channel use to air in India. It was sold to Indian media company, Zee media in 2000s. Later Essel group sold it to Sony Sports Network.)

== Wrestling Promotions in India ==
Freak Fighter Wrestling (FFW) runs shows in Sampala, Haryana. (Note: So far the live events organised by WWE in India were not live shows of WWE Raw or SmackDown, they was un-televised House shows)

The Wrestle Square promotion has established a pro wrestling school, Jeet Wrestle Square (JWS) academy, with Jeet Rama (Satendra Dagar) in Northern India.

Continental Wrestling Entertainment is the largest promotion and training school in India. It was created by the Great Khali in 2015 and is in Jalandhar, Punjab.

Due to the popularity of pro wrestling and India's vast market and economic potential, WWE often held tryouts in India to recruit wrestlers and train them at the WWE Performance Center in the US.

== Indian Wrestlers in the US ==
=== World Wrestling Entertainment ===
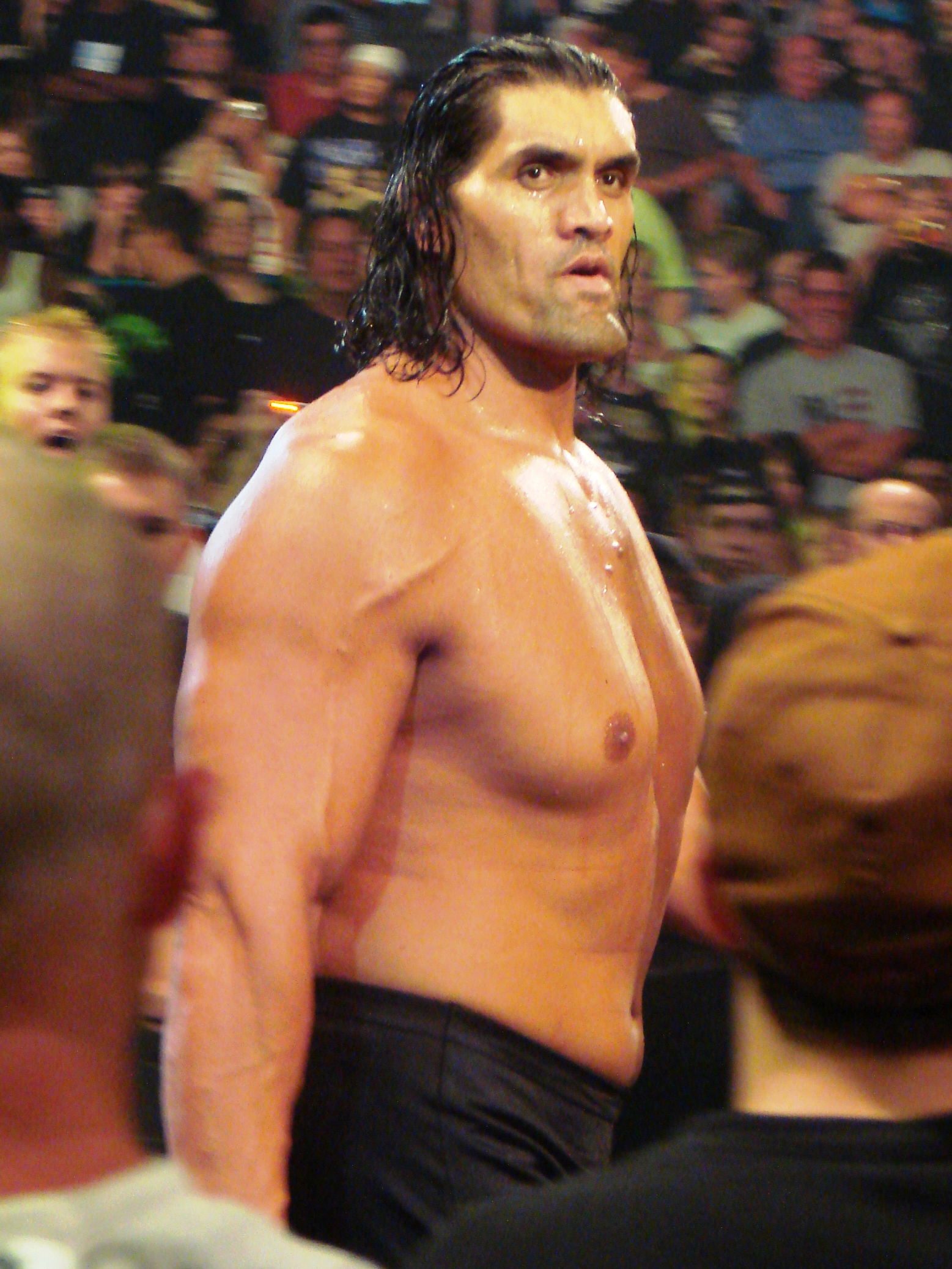
The Great Khali in Allstate Arena, Illinois at WWE No Mercy, 2007

Dalip Singh Rana, is widely known by his ring name The Great Khali. He was the first professional wrestler from India to be signed to WWE.

The Great Khali became WWE World Heavyweight Champion in 2007. (Note: The Great Khali is the first professional wrestler from India who signed–wrestled in WWE, later Kavita Devi, Saurav Gurjar, Rinku Singh etc joined it.) In the 20-man battle royale match, he defeated Batista, Kane and others. At the No Mercy 2007 pay-per-view he wrestled against Batista in a Punjabi Prison Match. (Note: Khali was the pioneer of Punjabi prison match. Jinder Mahal wrestled against challenger Randy Orton for WWE championship belt in this type of match, in it Khali helped Mahal by stopping Orton from escaping from the prison.) During his WWE career, he defeated WWE legends such as The Undertaker, John Cena and Rey Mysterio in his WWE career. On April 7, 2021, WWE honoured him by inducting him into the WWE Hall of Fame, making him the first professional wrestler from India who to receive this honour. (Note: The Great Khali has been inducted into WWE Hall of Fame (2021), it also called as WWE Hall of Fame class of 2021.) After WWE, he moved back to India and opened a pro wrestling promotion, Continental Wrestling Entertainment (CWE) in Jalandhar, Punjab, (Note: CWE is India's biggest professional wrestling promotion, per their website.) where he provided training to budding wrestlers and organised wrestling events.

Yuvraj Singh Dhesi (born July 19, 1986) is a Canadian professional wrestler of Punjabi descent. He is best known for his time in WWE, under the ring name Jinder Mahal, where he became the first WWE world champion of Indian descent in April 2017. He is the nephew of Gama Singh who helped to train him. He started his WWE in 2011 as the kayfabe brother-in-law of the Great Khali and they worked together as a tag team with manager Ranjin Singh. In 2016, he also wrestled for The Great Khali's wrestling promotion Continental Wrestling Entertainment (CWE) in India.

Indian wrestlers including Saurav Gurjar, Rinku Singh, Shanky, Satendra Dagar, (Note: Satendra Dagar was signed with WWE's NXT brand, performed by ring name Jeet Rama only in NXT, Superstar Spectacle episode and some house shows, he was not part of main roaster.) Lovepreet Sangha, Giant Zanjeer, Guru Raaj and Badshah Khan have since worked with WWE. (Note: Many wrestlers learnt wrestling from The Great Khali at his CWE promotion and later signed to WWE, NXT and further trained in WWE performance center in USA such as Shanky, Kavita Devi, Gaint Zanjeer.)

In 2017 Kavita Devi from Haryana became the first female professional wrestler of Indian nationality to wrestle in WWE.

Female MMA fighter Sanjana George from Kottayam worked for WWE for a year in 2021.

=== Total Nonstop Action ===
Amanpreet Singh Randhawa (born 2 May 1990 in Firozpur, Punjab) known as Mahabali Shera or simply Shera, is an Indian professional wrestler currently signed to Ohio Valley Wrestling. He has held the OVW National Heavyweight Champion. He also had a brief stint under contract with WWE from Sept 2018 to April 2019. In December 2011, under the ring name Mahabali Veera, Shera took part in the India project Ring Ka King.

In 2011, Total Nonstop Action Wrestling (later renamed Impact Wrestling) announced a project in India. The project was revealed to be an original televised wrestling program intended for the Indian market, titled Ring Ka King. The promotion was managed by Jeff Jarrett. Jeremy Borash, Dave Lagana and Sonjay Dutt helped Jarrett with management.

Ring Ka King ran for 26 episodes, from December 2011 to April 2012. It was taped in Pune, Maharashtra, India, and featured both Indian and non-Indian wrestlers performing on the show. A majority of the non-Indian wrestlers were under contract with TNA; this included Zema Ion, Scott Steiner, and Abyss, among others. Independent wrestlers Sonjay Dutt, Isaiah Cash and American Adonis were also featured on the show.

Ring Ka King had three singles Champions, Matt Morgan (US), Sir Brutus Magnus (UK) and Mahabali Veera (India). Mahabali was champion for three months until RKR came to an end. RKR also had three tag-teams as champions, Bulldog Hart and Chavo Guerro, Abyss and Scott Steiner and the Bollywood Boys, Gurv Sihra and Harva Shira. The Bollywood Boys were champions for three months until RKR came to an end.

Other Indian wrestlers involved in RKR were Aghori Saya, Deadley Danda, Jwala, Pagal Parinda, Pathani Pattha (three separate people), Romeo Rapta and Sonjay Dutt, with Kubra Sait, Siddharth Kannan and Harbhajan Singh also on camera.

Sonjay Dutt is an American professional wrestler of New Delhi descent. He has worked with Impact, WWE and AEW and became the first TNA/Impact champion of Indian descent in 2015 when he won the X Division belt.

The Desi Hit Squad was a tag team / stable in IMPACT Wrestling in 2018. It consisted of Mahabali Shera, Rohit Raju, Raj Singh and Bhupinder Singh with Gama Singh serving as manager.

=== All Elite Wrestling ===
Satnam Singh Bhamara (Punjabi: ਸਤਨਾਮ ਸਿੰਘ ਭੰਮਰਾ; born 10 December 1995 in Baloke, Punjab, India) is an Indian professional wrestler and former basketball player, signed to the American professional wrestling promotion All Elite Wrestling (AEW) since April 2022. At 7 ft 2in (218 cm) he is billed as ‘one in a billion’ and on-screen he is aligned with Sonjay Dutt.

== Wrestling on Indian Television ==
Following list contains TV shows created by multiple foreign wrestling promotions with India's professional wrestlers:

- 100% De Dana Dan - This was aired in 2009, and showed matches from a South African wrestling promotion Champions Pro Wrestling. It was filmed in South Africa and featured matches between South African and Indian wrestlers. It was aired on Colors TV.
- Ring Ka King - This was a show from the Total Non Stop Action (TNA) promotion. It included foreign and Indian wrestlers and was aired on Colors TV in India.
- Sunday Dhamaal - This was a weekly wrestling show from Sony Max featuring a summary of WWE storylines and matches from the immediate week hosted by Sahil Khattar.
- WWE Superstar Spectacle - In 2021, WWE created a special episode for WWE fans in India, broadcasting it on Sony Ten 1 Sony Ten 2 and Sony Max television channels on the occasion of India's Republic day, January 26, 2021.
- Netflix broadcasts WWE Promotion's Monday Night Raw and Friday Night Smackdown as its main brands.

== Gallery ==
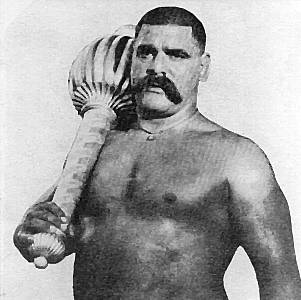
The Great Gama

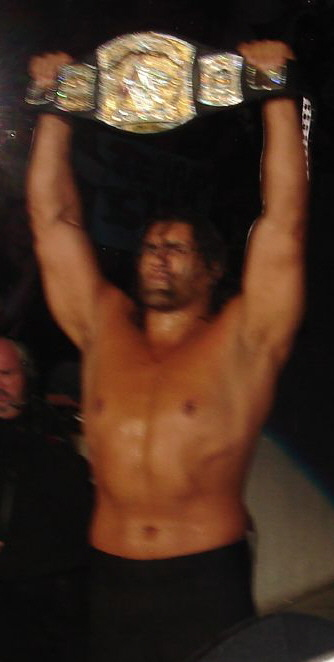
The Great Khali with the WWE belt

== See also ==
- Sport in India
- WWE in India
- List of professional wrestling related articles of India
- List of Indian professional wrestlers
- List of Indian male professional wrestlers
- List of Professional wrestling TV shows in India
