= WWE Superstar Spectacle =

Professional wrestling event series

- Promotions: WWE
- Brands: Raw (2021, 2023); SmackDown (2021); NXT (2021)
- Other names: Namaste India (2023)
- First event: 2021
- Last event: 2023

WWE Superstar Spectacle was a series of professional wrestling events produced by the American company WWE. The events have primarily targeted the promotion's Indian market, and have showcased talent of Indian heritage.

The event was first held in 2021 as WWE's first television special produced specifically for India as part of its broadcasting agreement with Sony Pictures Networks India (SPNI); it featured wrestlers from the Raw, SmackDown, and NXT brand divisions. It premiered on January 26, 2021—India's Republic Day—on SPNI channels, and was broadcast internationally as a streaming special on the WWE Network. As with all other WWE programming at the time due to the COVID-19 pandemic, the special was taped in the United States using its ThunderDome staging and virtual audience.

In September 2023, WWE held a second edition of Superstar Spectacle, this time as a Raw house show in Hyderabad, although it later aired in October in India under the name Namaste India.

== History ==
Coming out of the American professional wrestling promotion WWE's third-quarter financial call on October 29, 2020, WWE's president and Chief Financial Officer, Nick Khan, announced that they were working with Sony Pictures Networks India (SPNI) on producing an event specially targeted to the company's Indian market. Khan also revealed that the event would air in 2021 as a television special on India's Republic Day (January 26) and would mainly feature the promotion's developing Indian wrestlers.

On January 13, 2021, the title for the event was announced as Superstar Spectacle, and WWE revealed that wrestlers from the Raw, SmackDown, and NXT brand divisions, including WWE Champion Drew McIntyre, Rey Mysterio, Charlotte Flair, AJ Styles, Bayley, The New Day (Kofi Kingston and Xavier Woods), Shinsuke Nakamura, Cesaro, Dolph Ziggler, Robert Roode, Natalya, Ricochet, WWE Hall of Famer Ric Flair, and many more would be in attendance at the event. Jinder Mahal, the first WWE Champion of Indian descent, The Bollywood Boyz (Samir Singh and Sunil Singh), Indus Sher (Rinku and Saurav), Jeet Rama, Kavita Devi, Giant Zanjeer, Dilsher Shanky, and Guru Raaj, were all further confirmed to appear.

As with all other WWE programming at the time due to the COVID-19 pandemic, the 2021 Superstar Spectacle was filmed by way of a bio-secure bubble called the WWE ThunderDome, which at the time was hosted at Tropicana Field in St. Petersburg, Florida, United States. Reports prior to the taping suggested the special would be filmed at the WWE Performance Center's "Capitol Wrestling Center" studio in Orlando, Florida, the home of NXT, but this was not the case. The event itself was taped on January 22 and then aired on tape delay on January 26. The event premiered on Sony Max, Sony Ten 1, and Sony Ten 3, with commentary available in English and Hindi. Outside of India, the special was streamed on the WWE Network.

On August 1, 2023, WWE announced that a second Superstar Spectacle would be held on September 8, 2023, at the G. M. C. Balayogi Indoor Stadium in the Hyderabad suburb of Gachibowli, India. This was WWE's first live event to be held in India since 2017 and the first held in Hyderabad. Various wrestlers from the Raw brand were announced to be featured at the event due to SmackDown being held that same night in Boston, Massachusetts, United States. WWE had planned to again hold the event in January, but SPNI requested that it be held off until the company completed its merger with Zee Entertainment Enterprises. Unlike the 2021 event, the 2023 event was a non-televised house show. On August 21, it was confirmed that John Cena would appear at the event, with Cena himself stating that it would be his first time wrestling in India. This would end up being his only appearance in India as an in-ring performer due to his retirement from professional wrestling at the end of 2025.

== Events ==
#	Event	Date	City	Venue	Main event	Ref.
1	2021	January 22, 2021 (aired January 26)	St. Petersburg, Florida, United States	WWE ThunderDome at Tropicana Field	Drew McIntyre and Indus Sher (Rinku and Saurav) vs. Jinder Mahal and The Bollywood Boyz (Samir Singh and Sunil Singh)	
2	2023	September 8, 2023 (aired October 2)	Gachibowli, Hyderabad, Telangana, India	G. M. C. Balayogi Indoor Stadium	John Cena and Seth "Freakin" Rollins vs. Imperium (Giovanni Vinci and Ludwig Kaiser)	
(c) – refers to the champion(s) going into the match

== 2021 ==
Superstar Spectacle
- Promotional graphic featuring various WWE wrestlers
- Promotion: WWE
- Brand(s): Raw; SmackDown; NXT
- Date: January 22, 2021 (aired January 26, 2021)
- City: St. Petersburg, Florida, United States
- Venue: WWE ThunderDome at Tropicana Field
- Attendance: 0 (behind closed doors) (Note: The event was held without a paying audience due to the COVID-19 pandemic in the United States, though featured a live crowd of virtual fans via WWE's ThunderDome viewing experience.)
- Tagline(s): Indian Dhamaal; A Republic Day Blockbuster

WWE event chronology
← Previous; TLC: Tables, Ladders & Chairs	Next → Royal Rumble

Superstar Spectacle chronology
← Previous; First	Next → 2023

The 2021 Superstar Spectacle was a professional wrestling television special produced by the American company WWE, held for wrestlers from the promotion's Raw, SmackDown, and NXT brand divisions. It was the inaugural Superstar Spectacle which was taped on January 22, 2021, and aired on January 26 for India's Republic Day. Due to the COVID-19 pandemic, the event emanated from the WWE ThunderDome, a bio-secure bubble that at the time was hosted at Tropicana Field in St. Petersburg, Florida, United States. In India, it aired as a television special, while outside of the country, it was streamed on the WWE Network. The event incorporated elements of traditional and contemporary Indian culture.

Five matches were contested at the event. In the main event, Drew McIntyre and The Indus Sher (Rinku and Saurav) defeated The Bollywood Boyz (Samir Singh and Sunil Singh) and the returning Jinder Mahal. The event also featured the participation of 10 Indian wrestlers from WWE's developmental system. The company later announced that 20 million people had watched the event live.

=== Results ===
No.	Results	Stipulations	Times
1	Finn Bálor defeated Guru Raaj by pinfall	Singles match	7:08
2	Dilsher Shanky, Giant Zanjeer, Rey Mysterio, and Ricochet defeated Cesaro, Dolph Ziggler, King Corbin, and Shinsuke Nakamura by pinfall	Eight-man tag team match	6:25
3	AJ Styles (with Omos) defeated Jeet Rama by pinfall	Singles match	3:14
4	Charlotte Flair and Sareena Sandhu defeated Bayley and Natalya by pinfall	Tag team match	6:06
5	Drew McIntyre and Indus Sher (Rinku and Saurav) defeated Jinder Mahal and The Bollywood Boyz (Samir Singh and Sunil Singh) by pinfall	Six-man tag team match	9:03

== 2023 ==
Superstar Spectacle
- Promotional poster featuring various WWE wrestlers
- Promotion: WWE
- Brand: Raw
- Date: September 8, 2023 (aired October 2, 2023)
- City: Gachibowli, Hyderabad, Telangana, India
- Venue: G. M. C. Balayogi Indoor Stadium
- Attendance: 5,000 (sold out)

Superstar Spectacle chronology
← Previous; 2021	Next → Final

The 2023 Superstar Spectacle, also known as Namaste India, was a professional wrestling event produced by the American company WWE, held for wrestlers from the promotion's main roster brand, Raw. It was the second and final Superstar Spectacle and took place on September 8, 2023, at G. M. C. Balayogi Indoor Stadium in the Hyderabad suburb of Gachibowli, India. This was WWE's first live event held in India since December 2017 and the first held in the city of Hyderabad. Unlike the 2021 event, the 2023 event was initially held as a non-televised house show, but it later aired in India on Sony Sports Network on October 2, 2023, under the title Namaste India.

Seven matches took place at the event. In the main event, John Cena and Seth "Freakin" Rollins defeated Imperium (Giovanni Vinci and Ludwig Kaiser). The event also featured a special appearance by WWE Hall of Famer The Great Khali, who was WWE's first Indian-born world champion with the previous World Heavyweight Championship. Becky Lynch was originally scheduled to face Zoey Stark at the event, however, due to an issue with her passport, she was unable to attend; Natalya took her place and defeated Stark. Both of Natalya's matches were unappreciated at the event as fans chanted for CM Punk during her matches due to fan's displeasure with the absence of Becky Lynch and Natalya taking her spot. The event featured John Cena's only appearance in India as an in-ring performer due to his retirement from professional wrestling at the end of 2025.

=== Results ===
No.	Results	Stipulations
1	Kevin Owens and Sami Zayn vs. Indus Sher (Sanga and Veer) (with Jinder Mahal) ended in a no contest	Tag team match
2	Drew McIntyre, Kevin Owens, and Sami Zayn defeated Indus Sher (Jinder Mahal, Sanga, and Veer) by pinfall	Six-man tag team match
3	Natalya defeated Zoey Stark by pinfall	Singles match
4	Gunther (c) defeated Shanky by pinfall	Singles match for the WWE Intercontinental Championship
5	Bron Breakker defeated Odyssey Jones by pinfall	Singles match
6	Rhea Ripley (c) defeated Natalya by pinfall	Singles match for the Women's World Championship
7	John Cena and Seth "Freakin" Rollins defeated Imperium (Giovanni Vinci and Ludwig Kaiser) by pinfall	Tag team match
(c) / – the champion(s) heading into the match

== Reception ==
Ian Hamilton of 411Mania gave the 2021 Superstar Spectacle a 7.2 out of 10, remarking of the Indian performers (including those making their television debut) that "for a group of guys effectively trained from scratch, this wasn't half bad", and believing that the show was a potential step towards a future "NXT India" (following the example of NXT UK).

According to Sean Ross Sapp of Fightful, WWE claimed that 20 million people watched the 2021 event live.

== See also ==
- Professional wrestling in India
