= Ring Ka King =

Indian professional wrestling television series

- Logo of Ring Ka King
- Product type: Professional wrestling Sports entertainment
- Current owner: Endemol India
- Produced by: Jeff Jarrett; Dave Lagana; Sonjay Dutt; Jeremy Borash
- Country: India
- Introduced: 28 January 2012
- Discontinued: 22 April 2012
- Website: http://www.colorstv.in/rkk/

Ring Ka King
- No. of seasons: 1
- No. of episodes: 26

Production
- Running time: Approximately 1 hour per episode (45 minutes and commercials)
- Production companies: Endemol India; TNA Entertainment, LLC

Original release
- Network: Colors

Ring Ka King (transl. King of the Ring) is an Indian professional wrestling television series that was originally broadcast from January 2012 to April 2012 by Endemol India on Colors TV, consisting of 26 episodes. Filming for the series began in December 2011.

The series was heavily affiliated with the American Total Nonstop Action Wrestling (TNA) promotion, using some of its personnel and performers. However, due to the existing Indian television broadcasting obligations TNA had with Star Sports at the time, the Ring Ka King series could not contain any references to the "TNA" name. The "Ring Ka King" name is owned outright by Endemol India.

== History ==
In 2011, TNA Entertainment announced an affiliate project in India, later revealing it to be an original televised wrestling program series intended for the Indian market, titled Ring Ka King. Endemol India were in charge of the project, placing TNA founder Jeff Jarrett as director of the series, with Dave Lagana, Sonjay Dutt and Jeremy Borash as producers. Savio Vega and Nick Dinsmore were responsible for training the Indian talent at Ohio Valley Wrestling (OVW) in Louisville, Kentucky, USA. Post-production for the show was handled by TNA in Nashville, Tennessee, USA with Kevin Sullivan managing the process.

Ring Ka King was taped in India, and featured both Indian and non-Indian wrestlers performing on the show. A majority of the non-Indian wrestlers were under contract with TNA; this included Zema Ion, Scott Steiner, and Abyss, among others. There were also independent wrestlers and former TNA talent such as Sonjay Dutt, Trevor Murdoch who wrestled under the ring name Isaiah Cash, and Chris Masters who wrestled under the ring name American Adonis that were featured in the series.

== Championships ==
=== RKK World Heavyweight Championship ===
The RKK World Heavyweight Championship was a professional wrestling heavyweight championship and the highest ranked title in the promotion. RKK hosted a tournament to crown the first champion.

==== Title tournament ====
Quarterfinals
Dr. Nicholas Dinsmore
Mahabali Veera	W
Scott Steiner	W
Max B
Matt Morgan	W
Sir Brutus Magnus
Chavo Guerrero
Sonjay Dutt	W

Semifinals
Mahabali Veera
Scott Steiner	W
Matt Morgan	W
Sonjay Dutt

Finals
Scott Steiner
Matt Morgan	W

#	Order in reign history
Reign	The reign number for the specific set of wrestlers listed
Event	The event promoted by the respective promotion in which the titles were won
—	Used for vacated reigns so as not to count it as an official reign
+	Indicates the current reign is changing daily

#	Wrestler	Reign	Date	Days held	Location	Event	Notes	Ref(s)
1	Matt Morgan	1	19 December 2011	2	Pune, Maharashtra, India	Ring Ka King	Defeated Scott Steiner in the finals of an eight-man tournament to become the first champion. This episode aired on tape delay on 5 February 2012	
2	Sir Brutus Magnus	1	21 December 2011	33	Pune, Maharashtra, India	Ring Ka King	This episode aired on tape delay on 4 March 2012	
3	Mahabali Veera	1	23 January 2012	91	Pune, Maharashtra, India	Ring Ka King	This episode aired on tape delay on 21 April 2012	
—	Deactivated	—	22 April 2012	—	Pune, Maharashtra, India	—	Deactivated when Ring Ka King ended	—

=== RKK Tag Team Championship ===
The RKK Tag Team Championship was a professional wrestling tag team championship in the Ring Ka King promotion. RKK hosted a tournament to crown the first champions.

==== Title tournament ====
Quarterfinals
Pathani Patthe
The Sheiks (Sheik Mustafa Bashir and Sheik Abdul Bashir)	W
Bulldog Hart and Chavo Guerrero Jr.	W
Broadway and Hollywood
Sir Brutus Magnus and Sonjay Dutt	W
Jimmy Rave and Zema Ion
The Bollywood Boyz (Gurv Sihra and Harv Sihra)	W
Mumbai Catz

Semifinals
The Sheiks (Sheik Mustafa Bashir and Sheik Abdul Bashir)
Bulldog Hart and Chavo Guerrero Jr.	W
Sir Brutus Magnus and Sonjay Dutt	W
The Bollywood Boyz(Gurv Sihra and Harv Sihra)

Finals
Sir Brutus Magnus and Sonjay Dutt
Bulldog Hart and Chavo Guerrero Jr.	W

#	Order in reign history
Reign	The reign number for the specific set of wrestlers listed
Event	The event promoted by the respective promotion in which the titles were won
—	Used for vacated reigns so as not to count it as an official reign
+	Indicates the current reign is changing daily

#	Wrestlers	Reign	Date	Days held	Location	Event	Notes	Ref(s)
1	Bulldog Hart and Chavo Guerrero Jr.	1	20 December 2011	28	Pune, Maharashtra, India	Ring Ka King	Hart and Guerrero defeated Sir Brutus Magnus and Sonjay Dutt in the finals of a tournament to become the inaugural champions. This episode aired on tape delay on 19 February 2012	
2	RDX (Abyss and Scott Steiner)	1	17 January 2012	5	Pune, Maharashtra, India	Ring Ka King	This episode aired on tape delay on 11 March 2012	
3	The Bollywood Boyz (Gurv Sihra and Harv Sihra)	1	22 January 2012	92	Pune, Maharashtra, India	Ring Ka King	This episode aired on tape delay on 14 April 2012	
—	Deactivated	—	22 April 2012	—	Pune, Maharashtra, India	—	Deactivated when Ring Ka King ended	—

== Alumni ==
=== Male wrestlers ===
Ring name	Real name	Notes
Abyss	Chris Parks	
Aghori Saya	Monty Singh	
American Adonis	Christopher Mordetzky	
Barood	Sandeep Tikone	
Bulldog Hart	Harry Smith	
Chavo Guerrero Jr.	Salvador Guerrero IV	
Deadly Danda	Saurav Gurjar	
Dr. Nicholas Dinsmore	Nicholas Dinsmore	
Gurv Sihra	Gurv Sihra	
Harv Sihra	Harv Sihra	
Isaiah Cash	Andrew Hankinson	
Jeff Jarrett	Jeffrey Jarrett	Founder
Jimmy Rave	James Guffey	Producer/Trainer
Joey Hollywood	Joseph Meehan	
Jwala	Tejinder Singh	
Mahabali Veera	Amanpreet Singh	
Matt Morgan	Matthew Morgan	
Maxx B	Max Basnet	
Mumbai Cat #1	James Guffey	
Mumbai Cat #2	Joseph Meehan	
Pagal Parinda	Vikas Kumar	
Pathani Pattha #1	Ashab Ahmad Malik Hashim	
Pathani Pattha #2	Ghulam Sabir	
Roscoe Jackson	William Mueller	
Romeo Rapta	Dinesh Kumar Rapta	
Scott Steiner	Scott Rechsteiner	
Sheik Abdul Bashir	Dara Daivari	
Sheik Mustafa Bashir	Ariya Daivari	
Shera	Harjeet Singh	American Adonis' translator/Wrestler
Sir Brutus Magnus	Nicholas Aldis	
Sonjay Dutt	Retesh Bhalla	
Tony Broadway	James Maritato	Producer/Trainer
TNT	Juan Rivera	
Yamamotoyama	Yamamotoyama Ryūta	
Zema Ion	Michael Paris	
Zoravar	Sarvesh Kumar	

=== Female wrestlers ===
Ring name	Real name	Notes
Alissa Flash/Raisha Saeed	Melissa Anderson	As Raisha Saeed, manager of The Sheiks (Sheik Abdul Bashir and Sheik Mustafa Bashir)
Mickie James	Mickie James	
Angelina Love	Lauren Williams	

=== Management ===
Ring name	Real name	Notes
Dave Lagana	Dave Lagana	Head writer
Dutch Mantell	Wayne Keown	Trainer
Jeremy Borash	Jeremy Borash	Interviewer; Ring announcer
Jazzy Lahoria	Jazzy Lahoria	Commissioner (kayfabe)
Joe Bath	Joe Bath	Commentator
Keith Mitchell	Keith Mitchell	Producer
Kubra Sait	Kubbra Sait	Ring announcer
Rick Fansher	Rick Fansher	Director
Rudy Charles	Daniel Engler	Referee
Bill Clark	Bill Clark	Referee
Ram Menan	Ram Menan	Interviewer
Siddharth Kannan	Siddharth Kannan	Commentator
Harbhajan Singh	Harbhajan Singh	Promoter
Savio Vega	Juan Rivera	Trainer

== International broadcasters ==
Country	Network	Ref
Canada	Rogers Cable (Colors)	
United Kingdom	Sky (Colors)	
United States	Dish Network (Colors)	

== See also ==
- Professional wrestling in India
- List of professional wrestling television series
- 100% De Dana Dan
