= S. Theodore Baskaran =

Indian film historian

Theodore Baskaran
- சுந்தரராஜ் தியடோர் பாஸ்கரன்
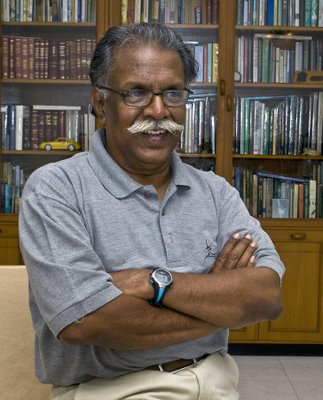
- Born: 1940 (age 85–86); Dharapuram, Coimbatore District (composite), Madras Presidency, British India (now part of Tiruppur District, Tamil Nadu, India)
- Citizenship: Indian
- Education: Madras Christian College
- Occupations: Film historian, Author, Civil Servant
- Spouse: Thilaka Baskaran
- Writing career
- Period: 1976–present
- Subjects: Cinema, Wildlife
- Notable works: The Message Bearers; The Eye of the Serpent
- Notable awards: Golden Lotus (Best Book on Cinema) Award for The Eye of the Serpent

Sundararaj Theodore Baskaran (born 1940) is a film historian and wildlife conservationist from Tamil Nadu, India.

== Early life and education ==
Theodore Baskaran was born in Dharapuram, (in present-day Tiruppur district, Tamil Nadu) in 1940. He completed his Intermediate at St. John's College, Palayamkottai and obtained a BA (Hons) Degree in History from Madras Christian College in 1960.

== Career ==
Baskaran worked as Researcher at the Tamil Nadu State Archives for two years. He joined the Indian Postal Service in 1964 as Divisional Superintendent at Trichy. He served as the "Special Officer for War Efforts" in Shillong during the Indo-Pakistani War of 1971. He took study leave in 1974 to research Tamil film history on a fellowship from Council of Historical Research. He eventually retired as the Chief Postmaster General of Tamil Nadu.

Baskaran published his first article on film in 1972 about Chidananda Dasgupta's documentary The Dance of Shiva. Encouraged by his friend Charles A. Ryerson, he decided to do research about Tamil Cinema and joined a Film Appreciation course in 1974. He became a member of the Advisory Board of National Film Archives, Pune. In 1976 he joined the Calcutta Film Society. The same year, he presented his first research article titled Film Censorship as an Instrument of Political Control in British India in the Indian History Congress at Aligarh. This and other articles formed the core of his first book The Message Bearers published in 1981. His second book The Eye of the Serpent (1996) won the Golden Lotus (Best Book on Cinema) Award in 1997. He has also written several books and articles on film history in Tamil. He was a Senior Associate in National Institute of Advanced Studies, Bangalore. He has lectured on cinema in many universities including Princeton University, The Australian National University and the University of Chicago. In 2000, he won the Ki Va Ja prize awarded by the Kamban Kazhagam. He was a Hughes Visiting Scholar in the University of Michigan in 2001 and taught a course on Film Studies. He was a jury member at the 2003 National Film Awards. During 1998–2001, he was the Director of the Roja Muthiah Research Library. He is a member of the library's Board of Trustees. He has also acted in a supporting role in the 2010 Tamil film Aval Peyar Thamizharasi.

Baskaran is a keen bird watcher and a naturalist. He is a former honorary wild life warden and the South India Representative of the International Primate Protection League. He is a trustee of WWF-India. His collection of essays on nature and wild life conservation has been published as The Dance of the Sarus (Oxford University Press) in 1999. He edited a book of articles on nature titled "The Sprint of The Black Buck"; Penguin (2009)

== Personal life ==
He is married to Thilaka Baskaran and lives in Bengaluru, Karnataka.

== Bibliography ==
=== Books in English ===
- The Message Bearers: The nationalist politics and the entertainment media in South India, 1880–1945, Chennai: Cre-A (1981). Second edition by New Horizon Media.(2009)
- The Eye of the Serpent: An introduction to Tamil cinema, Chennai: East West Books (1996)
- The Dance of the Sarus: Essays of a Wandering Naturalist, Oxford University Press (1999)
- History through the Lens – Perspectives on South Indian Cinema, Hyderabad: Orient Blackswan (2009)
- Sivaji Ganesan: Profile of an Icon, Wisdom Tree, Delhi (2009)
- (ed.) The Sprint of the Black Buck, Penguin (2010)
- The Book of Indian Dogs, Aleph Book Company (2017)

=== Books in Tamil ===
- (ed.) Mazhaikalamum Kuyilosaiyum, Kalachuvadu (2003)
- Em Thamizhar Seidha padam, Uyirmmai Padippagam (2004)
- (ed.) Chitthiram Pesuthadi, Kalachuvadu (2004)
- Tamil Cinemavin Mugangal, Kanmani Veliyeedu (2004)
- Innum Pirakkadha Thalaimuraikkaga, Uyirmmai Padippagam (2006)
- Thamarai Pootha Thadagam, Uyirmmai Padippagam (2005)
- (trans.) Kaanurai Vengai (The way of the Tiger by K. Ullas Karanth), Kalachuvadu (2006)
- Vaanil Parakkum Pullelam, Uyirmmai Padippagam (2012)
- Soppana Vaazhvil Magizhndhe, Kalachuvadu (2014)
