= Parowal =

- Village
- Country: India
- State: Punjab
- District: Gurdaspur
- Tehsil: Batala
- Region: Majha

Government
  - Type: Panchayat raj
  - Body: Gram panchayat

Area
  - Total: 240 ha (590 acres)

Population (2011)
  - Total: 1,407; 727/680 ♂/♀
  - Scheduled Castes: 619; 320/299 ♂/♀
  - Total Households: 277

Languages
  - Official: Punjabi
- Time zone: UTC+5:30 (IST)
- Telephone: 01871
- ISO 3166 code: IN-PB
- Vehicle registration: PB-18
- Website: gurdaspur.nic.in

Parowal is a village in Batala in Gurdaspur district of Punjab State, India. It is located 18 kilometres (11 mi) from sub-district headquarter, 40 kilometres (25 mi) from district headquarter and 10 kilometres (6.2 mi) from Sri Hargobindpur. The village is administrated by Sarpanch an elected representative of the village.

== Demography ==
As of 2011, the village has a total of 277 houses and a population of 1407, of which 727 are males, while 680 are females. According to the report published by Census India in 2011, of the total village population, 619 people are from Schedule Caste and the village does not have any Schedule Tribe population.

== See also ==
- Basanta Singh (wrestler)
- List of villages in India
