= Ambika Charan Guha =

Indian wrestler

- অম্বিকাচরণ গুহ
- Born: 1843; Kolkata, Bengal, British India
- Died: 1900 (aged 56–57); Kolkata, Bengal, British India
- Occupation: Wrestler
- Children: Khetra Charan Guha
- Parent: Abhay Charan Guha

Ambika Charan Guha (Bengali: অম্বিকাচরণ গুহ; 1843–1900), popularly known as Ambu babu (Bengali: অম্বুবাবু) or Ambu Guha (Bengali: অম্বু গুহ), was an Indian wrestler who pioneered the growth of akhara culture in Bengal.

== Early life ==
Ambika Charan came from a family of wrestlers. His grandfather, Shiv Charan Guha, patronized Pehlwani and is credited with popularizing the sport in Bengal. Ambika Charan was born to Abhay Charan Guha in 1843 in Hogolkuria in Kolkata. The locality is near the Masjidbari Street near Hatibagan.

Ambika Charan suffered a serious injury at the age of eight or nine. At the advice of the doctor he began to continue his studies at home. He also continued his physical exercises and took lessons in horse riding at home. He was trained in Pehlwani by Kalicharan Chaubey of Mathura.

== Career ==
In 1857, at the age of sixteen, Ambika, founded the first akhara of Bengal, at the advice of his grandfather. Ambika then travelled throughout British India learning different wrestling and weight lifting tricks. He engaged in wrestling bouts with contemporary Indian wrestlers and became victorious in many of them. He came to be known as "Ambu babu" or "Raja babu".

His akhara became a pilgrimage to the budding wrestlers of India. Ambika Charan became a Pehlwani trainer and the budding wrestlers of Bengal used to train under him. Swami Vivekananda in his early years, learned wrestling in Ambu babu's akhara.

Some of his famous students are listed below.

- Khetra Charan Guha or Khetu babu
- Rabindranath Tagore
- Jatindra Charan Guho
- Swami Vivekananda
- Swami Brahmananda
- Jatindranath Mukherjee or Bagha Jatin
- Phanindra Krishna Gupta

== Legacy ==
His son, Khetra Charan Goho, (popularly known as Khetu babu) also became an accomplished wrestler. Khetu babu's nephew, Jatindra Charan Goho, went on to become an accomplished wrestler who became the first Asian to win the World Light Heavyweight Championship in the United States in 1921.

The akhara culture subsequently flourished in Bengal and the Bengali Hindu elite were drawn into it. Hundreds of akharas began to proliferate in the nooks and crannies of Bengal, some of which later became the breeding ground of revolutionary nationalist activities.
