= Basanta Singh (wrestler) =

Indian wrestler (1890–1965)

Singh, c. 1927

Basanta Singh (a.k.a. Basanta Ram Garcha; 1890–1965), was an Indian wrestler who wrestled in the United States. Singh was born in 1890 in Parowal in the Punjab. While in the United States, he worked with Gobar Goho, also known as Chandra Guho, who helped to increase Singh's fame. He competed in wrestling during the 1920s and in 1929, he faced Matty Matsuda in the ring. As a result of the injuries he sustained in the ring, Matsuda died.

== Later life ==
Singh never returned to India, and died in the United States in 1965.
