= Jatindra Charan Guho =

Indian wrestler

Jatindra Charan Guha
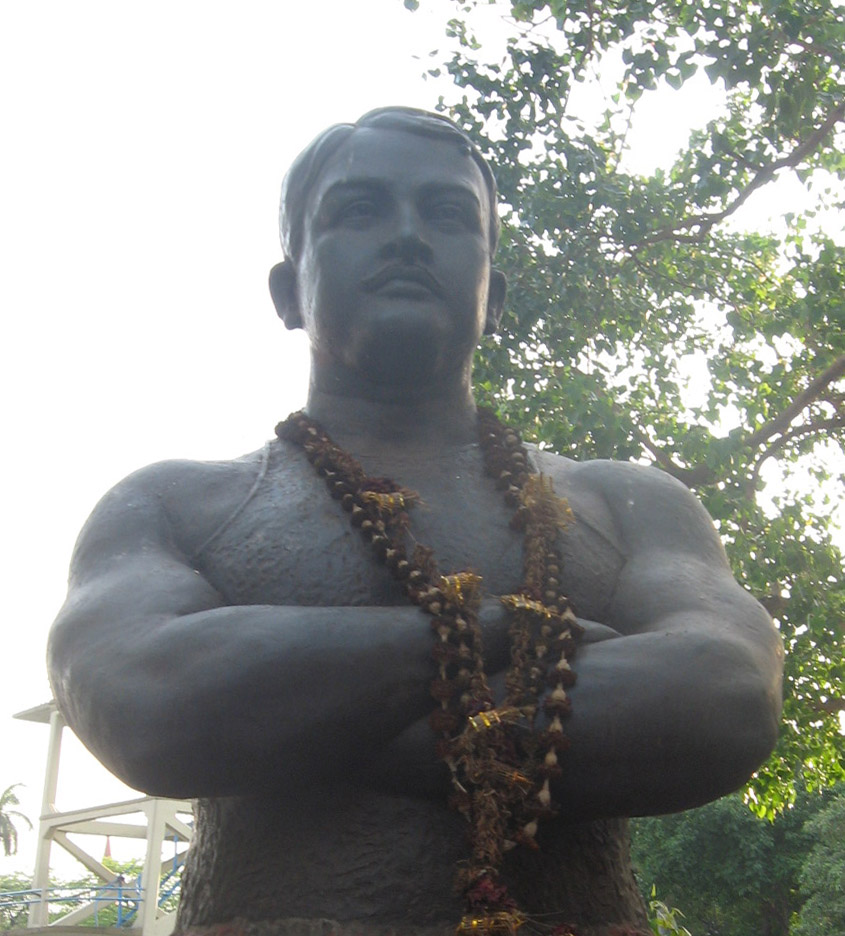
- Bust of Gobar Guha in Azad Hind Bagh

Personal information
- Born: Jatindra Charan Guha; 13 March 1892 Calcutta, Bengal Presidency, British India
- Died: 2 January 1972 (aged 79) Calcutta, West Bengal, India

Professional wrestling career
- Billed height: 6 ft 1 in (185 cm)
- Billed weight: 290 lb (132 kg)
- Trained by: Ambika Charan Guha; Khetra Charan Guha; Ram Charan Guha; Kholsa Chaubey; Rahmani Pehlwan
- Debut: 1910
- Retired: 1944

Jatindra Charan Guha (13 March 1892 – 2 January 1972), popularly known by his ring name Gobar Guha, was an Indian professional wrestler trained in pehlwani wrestling. Guha spent most of his career wrestling internationally, defeating champion wrestlers Wladek Zbyszko, Renato Gardini, Ad Santel, and Joe Stecher. By defeating Santel, he became the first Asian to win a World Wrestling Championship in the United States.

== Early life ==
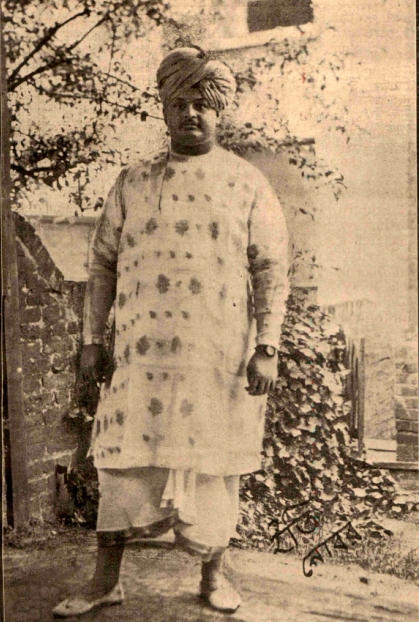
Guha in Edinburgh

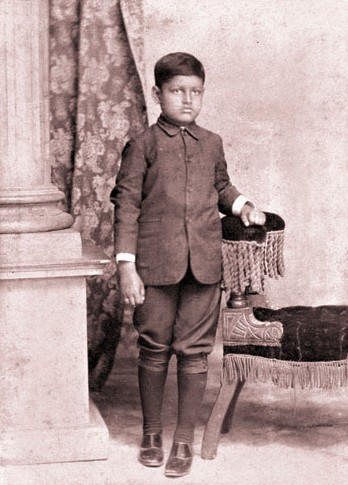
Jatindra Charan Guha in his early year

Guha came from a family of wrestlers. The Guha family had been known for pioneering, promoting and popularising the art of pehlwani and physical culture in Bengal, for generations. His great-grandfather had set up an akhara at Masjidbari Street. His forebears included the legendary Ambu babu, and Khetu babu, who tutored Swami Vivekananda in the finer points of wrestling. His father Ram Charan was also well-versed in the art.

Guha was born to Ram Charan in 1892 in Calcutta, Bengal Presidency (now Kolkata, West Bengal). He began his initial training under the guidance of his grandfather Ambika Charan Guha. He also took lessons from his uncle Khetra Charan Goho and father Ram Charan Goho. He began rigorous training under famous Indian wrestlers like Kholsa Chaubey and Rahmani Pehlwan, who were employed by the Goho family.

When Guha reached adulthood he stood at six feet and one inch and weighed around 290 pounds. His expanded chest measured 48 inches. In the meanwhile he also passed the Entrance examination from Vidyasagar school in 1910. He also received training in Hindustani classical music from Kukuv Khan and used to attend the musical soirees of Narendranath Basu.

== Career ==
Guha embarked on a professional career in wrestling in 1910 at the age of eighteen. He debuted against Navrang Singh, the court wrestler of the Maharaja of Tripura, but he did not take any money.

In 1910, the John Bull Society of London organised a world wrestling championship bout to which wrestlers from all over the world including Gobar Guha and Junior Gama of India were invited. In his first tour of Europe, Guha fought bouts in Italy, Switzerland and England. He went on a second tour of Europe in 1912 and returned home in 1915. During the trip he met Jack Johnson, the first black world heavyweight boxing champion at the wrestling tournament in Paris. Next he defeated Jimmy Campbell, the highest-ranked wrestler of Scotland. His next bout was against Scottish strongman and wrestler Jimmy Esson of Aberdeen, who was described by the great strongman and wrestler Georg Hackenschmidt as 'the Scotch Giant'. Esson was at the receiving end throughout the fight and in the end resorted to illegal boxing punches. Guha defeated Esson, but was not given the championship as he was not British.

After World War I, Guha went on a third tour of Europe and the United States from 1920 to 1926. Some of the matches during this tour included:

- 4 April 1921: defeated Joe Schultz, Chicago Coliseum, 13 minutes
- 26 April 1921: defeated Mortimer Henderson, Boston, 13 minutes and 8 seconds
- 10 May 1921: defeated Tommy Draak, Buffalo, 27 minutes
- 11 May 1921: defeated Bob Wilkie, Buffalo, 12 minutes
- 15 May 1921: defeated Farmer Bailey, Chicago, 15 minutes
- 20 June 1921: defeated Wladek Zbyszko, St. Louis
- 25 June 1921: defeated Renato Gardini
- 7 September 1921: defeated Joe Ramaona [sic], Wichita
- 27 October 1921: defeated Joe Stecher, Convention Hall, Kansas City, 1 hour and 17 minutes
- 29 December 1921: defeated John Granovitch, Chalmers Garage, Tennessee

During this tour, he fought the bout of his lifetime against catch wrestler and former World Light Heavyweight Champion Ad Santel on 24 August 1921 at the Coliseum in San Francisco. Billed for the "World Wrestling Championship", Guha defeated Santel after an hour. He became the first Asian to win a professional wrestling world championship in the United States.

In a following bout he was pitted against the famous Ed 'Strangler' Lewis. Lewis first tried his famous headlock on Guha but to little effect. After a few rounds, Lewis managed to floor Guha once, but the latter soon returned the compliment. Both fighters had registered two falls each, when Lewis resorted to foul play by hitting Guha with a boxer's punch. When the referee overlooked this offence, Guha turned to the judges to remonstrate, but at this moment, Lewis floored Guha with a resounding thump, causing him to hit his head on the boards and lose consciousness.

In 1929, Guha fought another memorable fight against the younger Gama at Park Circus, Calcutta in a bout that has since passed into the folklore of Indian wrestling. After a stirring fight which showcased all the moves of Indian wrestling, the older Guha finally lost on a technicality. The akhara that was established by his ancestors at Masjidbari Street was reincarnated by Gobar Guha at Goabagan in 1936. Gobar Guha retired from professional wrestling in 1944.

== Legacy ==
Gobar Guha developed his own style of wrestling with influences from catch-as-catch-can and Greco-Roman wrestling, which took Indian wrestling to new heights. His style included his wrestling holds like dhonka, tibbi, gadhanet, dhak, tang, pat, dhobiya pat and kulla which later became a part and parcel of Indian wrestling. He was famous for vicious chops known as radda. His achievements and success inspired Bengali Hindus to take up wrestling as a career which was seen as the traditional bastion of Muslims.

Not only wrestlers but the famous body builders like Manohar Aich and Monotosh Roy were inspired by his successes. His own disciples included his son Manik and his students Banamali Ghosh, Jyotish Charan Ghosh and Biswanath Dutta. His followers observed his birth centenary in 1992.

Goabagan Street in North Kolkata has been named Gobar Goho Sarani in his honour. His statue was installed and unveiled at the Azad Hind Bagh in 1996 by the then Governor of West Bengal, Late Raghunath Reddy. His akhara Gobar Goho's Gymnasium currently runs in Kolkata. The nearest prominent landmark is the Scottish Church College.

== See also ==
- Basanta Singh (wrestler)
