= The Bollywood Boyz =

Professional wrestling tag team

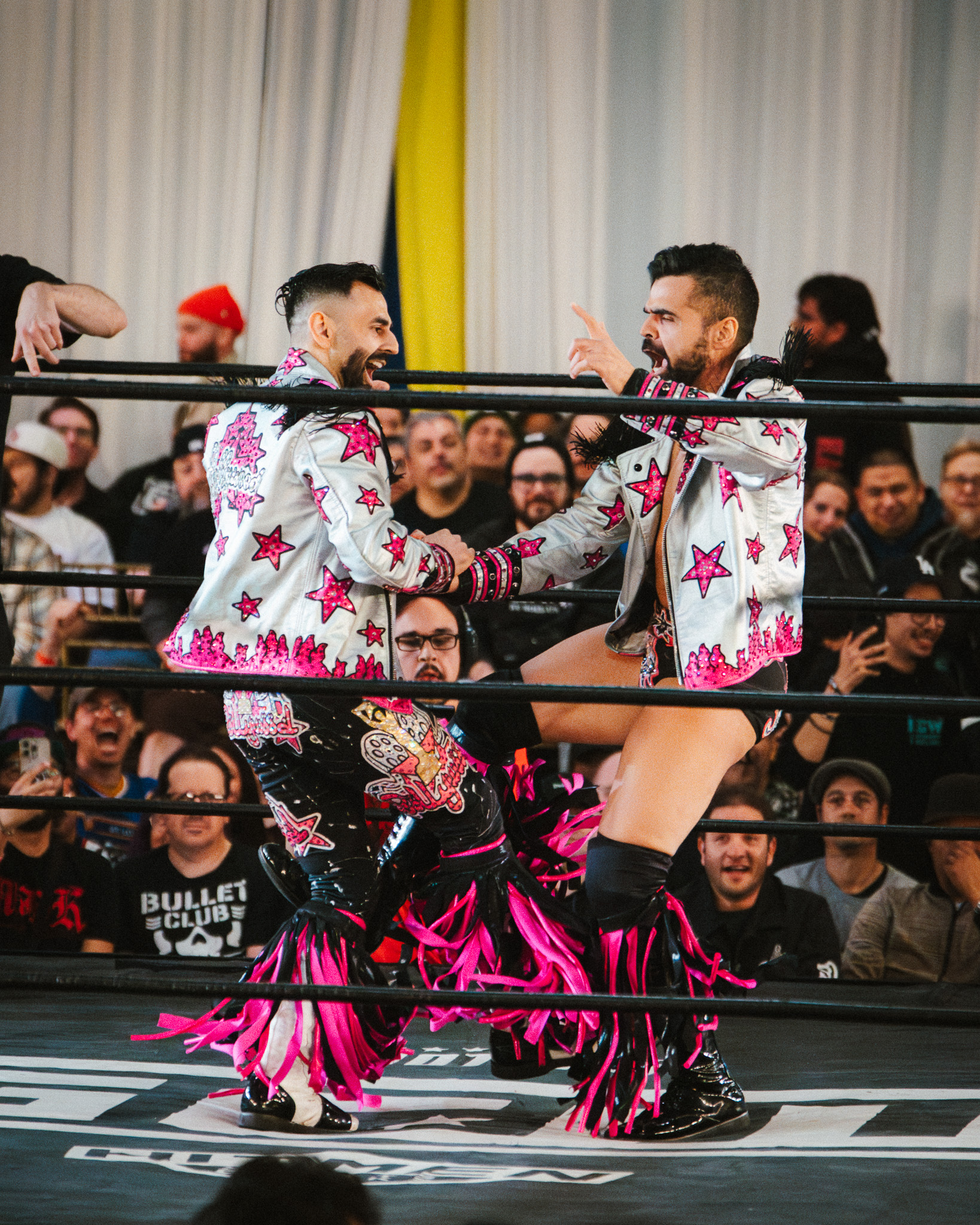
- Gurv (right) and Harv (left) in March 2025

Statistics
- Members: Gurvinder "Gurv" Sihra / Sunil Singh; Harvinder "Harv" Sihra / Samir Singh
- Name(s): The Bollywood Boyz; The Bollywood Lions; The Bollywood Brothers; The Sihra Brothers; The Singh Brothers
- Billed heights: Gurv: 5 ft 10 in (1.78 m); Harv: 5 ft 9 in (1.75 m)
- Combined billed weight: 303 lb (137 kg)
- Hometown: Burnaby, British Columbia, Canada
- Billed from: Burnaby, British Columbia, Canada; Punjab, India
- Debut: October 2005 (Gurv); May 2006 (Harv)
- Years active: 2006–present
- Trained by: Rip Rogers; Harley Race; Hart Dungeon; Extreme Canadian Championship Wrestling

The Bollywood Boyz are a Canadian professional wrestling tag team composed of brothers Gurvinder "Gurv" Sihra (born November 13, 1984) and Harvinder "Harv" Sihra (born November 2, 1987). They are best known for their time in WWE, where Gurvinder and Harvinder performed under the ring names Sunil Singh and Samir Singh, respectively.

They made their main roster debut on SmackDown in April 2017, repackaged as The Singh Brothers and the managers of Jinder Mahal. They managed Mahal to his reign as WWE Champion and continued to accompany him until 2019, when the duo began wrestling on 205 Live. In October 2020, both men reverted to The Bollywood Boyz team name and gimmick. They were released from WWE in June 2021.

== Professional wrestling career ==
=== Early career (2005–2015) ===
Gurv began training in 2004 with Rip Rogers at Ohio Valley Wrestling, Harley Race, and in the Hart Dungeon. Gurv debuted in Ohio Valley Wrestling in October 2005, and Harv followed suit. The brothers wrestled for a short time as singles wrestlers: Harv as "Bollywood Don" and Gurv as "Golden Lion". As a tag team, The Bollywood Boyz (originally The Bollywood Lions) won the ECCW Tag Team Championship five times between 2011 and 2015. Early in their careers, the brothers also wrestled on Tony Condello's "Death Tour" of Manitoba, a tour known for its rough conditions.

In 2011, The Bollywood Boyz wrestled in India as part of the TNA-sponsored Ring Ka King promotion. On December 19, 2011, they took part of a tournament to crown the inaugural RKK Tag Team Champions defeating The Mumbai Cats (Leopard and Puma) in the quarterfinals. The following night they were eliminated from the tournament by RDX (Sir Brutus Magnus and Sonjay Dutt) in the semifinals. On January 22, 2012, The Bollywood Boyz defeated RDX (Abyss and Scott Steiner) to become the RKK Tag Team Champions. On April 23, 2012, they vacated the championships after the promotion closed.

On July 24, 2015, The Bollywood Boyz made their debut for Jeff Jarrett's promotion Global Force Wrestling (GFW), where they participated in a tournament to crown the inaugural GFW Tag Team Champions. They defeated The Akbars (Ali and Omar) in the quarterfinals of the tournament. On October 23, 2015, at Global Force Wrestling's TV tapings, The Bollywood Boyz defeated Reno Scum to become the first ever GFW Tag Team Champions.

=== WWE (2016–2021) ===
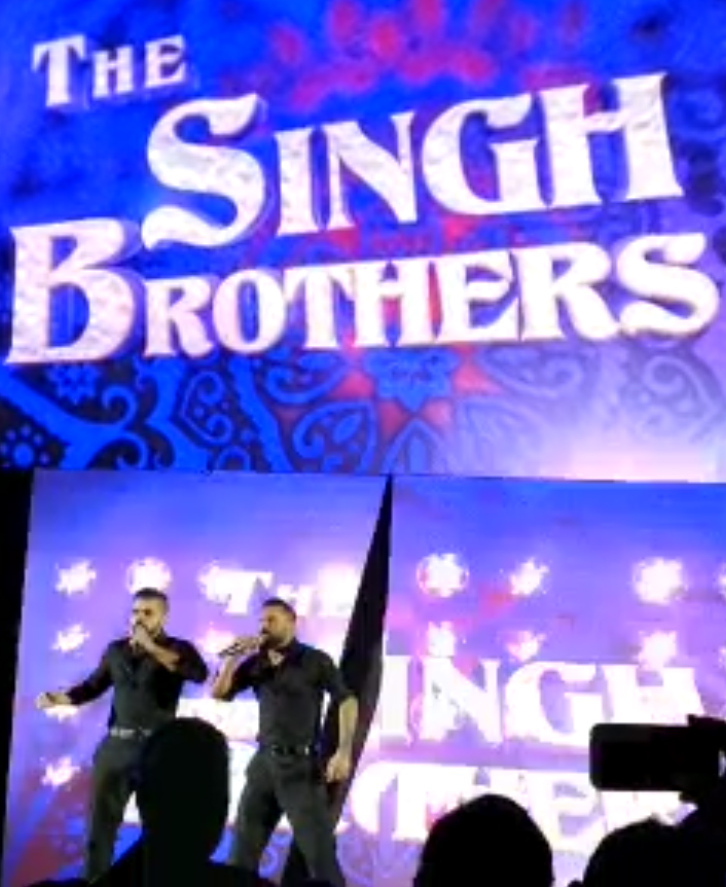
The Singh Brothers in 2017

==== NXT and 205 Live (2016–2017) ====
On June 13, 2016, Gurv and Harv were announced as participants in WWE's Cruiserweight Classic tournament. On June 23, both Sihras were eliminated from the tournament in their first round matches, with Gurv losing to Noam Dar and Harv losing to Drew Gulak. The Bollywood Boyz debuted in the WWE developmental territory NXT at the September 15 tapings. They also took part in the second annual Dusty Rhodes Tag Team Classic; however, they were eliminated by The Authors of Pain in the first round. On the premiere episode of 205 Live in November 2016, The Bollywood Boyz defeated Tony Nese and Drew Gulak in their debut tag team match.

==== Managing Jinder Mahal (2017–2019) ====
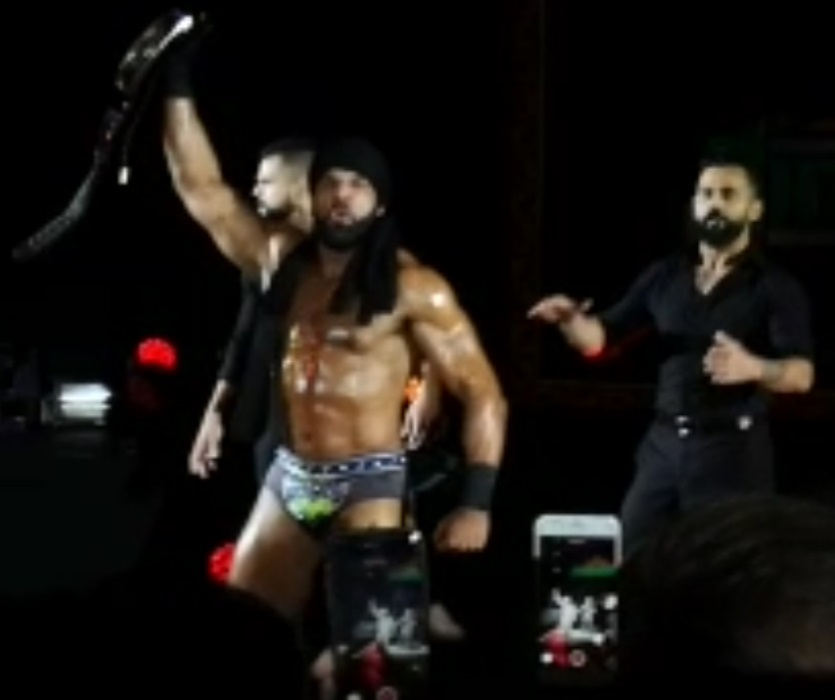
The Singh Brothers helped Jinder Mahal to retain the WWE Championship during his reign

On the April 18, 2017, episode of SmackDown Live, they made their main roster debut as The Singh Brothers; Gurv was renamed Sunil Singh, while Harv was renamed Samir Singh. They interfered in a six-pack challenge match to determine the number one contender for Randy Orton's WWE Championship at Backlash, helping Jinder Mahal win the match, turning heel in the process. During Mahal's reign as champion, they usually interfered during his title defences. On the January 16, 2018, episode of SmackDown Live, Samir suffered a torn ACL during a ringside brawl with Bobby Roode. On April 16, The Singh Brothers moved to Raw brand as part of the Superstar Shake-up alongside Jinder Mahal. On the October 15 episode of Raw, Samir returned after his injury to unite with his brother and Mahal. Sunil and Samir wrestled their first match on the January 1, 2019, episode of Raw when they teamed up with Mahal to defeat Heath Slater and Rhyno, in a 2-on-3 handicap match.

==== Return to 205 Live and 24/7 Champions (2019–2021) ====
During the 2019 WWE Superstar Shake-up, the Singh Brothers and Jinder Mahal were drafted back to SmackDown. The following week, the Singh Brothers were drafted over to 205 Live, separating them from Mahal. Since then, they have changed their gimmicks, very similar to their previous gimmick of The Bollywood Boyz and have been competing in tag team matches regularly. On October 21, 2019, Sunil – after a distraction from Samir – pinned R-Truth backstage during Raw to win the WWE 24/7 Championship, marking the first title for either of the Singh Brothers in WWE. 10 days later at Crown Jewel, Sunil lost the title to Truth after they both were eliminated from a battle royal, but later in the evening Samir pinned Truth backstage to win the title for the first time in his own right. 18 days later, Samir lost the title backstage on an episode of Raw to Truth, who was disguised as a doctor. Since then, both brothers have regained and lost the championship at various house shows. On the October 9, 2020, edition of 205 Live, it was announced that The Singh Brothers would return to the brand, going back to The Bollywood Boyz gimmick. On June 25, 2021, they were released from their WWE contracts.

=== Independent circuit (2021–present) ===
After their release from WWE in June 2021, Gurv and Harv Sihra, known as The Bollywood Boyz, returned to the independent wrestling scene, competing across North America and internationally.

In December 2021, with assistance from DEFY Wrestling in resolving visa issues, the duo debuted in the promotion, challenging The Midnight Heat for the DEFY Tag Team Championship at DEFY Darkhorse.

On October 17, 2022, The Bollywood Boyz appeared on AEW Dark: Elevation, facing Gunn Club. They also competed in Ring of Honor, wrestling Dalton Castle's "boys," Brandon and Brent.

In November 2022, they faced the Second Gear Crew for the DEFY Tag Team Championship at DEFY Fightwave.

In June 2023, they participated in a Mumbai Street Fight against the Second Gear Crew at DEFY Heathens.

On June 25, 2023, The Bollywood Boyz defended the DEFY Tag Team Championship against Matt Cross and Psycho Mike at DEFY x PROGRESS in Toronto.

In November 2023, they competed in a four-way ladder match for the inaugural BRCW Tag Team Championship at Boca Raton Championship Wrestling.

On August 2, 2024, The Bollywood Boyz reunited with former WWE ally Raj Dhesi (formerly Jinder Mahal) at GCW's "Now and Forever" event. Disguised under masks, they assisted Dhesi in a match against Effy.

In March 2025, The Bollywood Boyz captured the WSW Tag Team Championship in Australia at WSW Legacy – Tag 1, defeating The Parea.

On March 15, 2025, they faced C4 in a double chain match at DEFY Aftermath.

== Other media ==
Gurv and Harv, as The Singh Brothers, appear in WWE 2K19 and WWE 2K20 as non-playable managers for Jinder Mahal.

== Personal lives ==
The Sihra brothers are originally from Burnaby, British Columbia, Canada and are of Indian descent. They both graduated from Moscrop Secondary School. Gurv graduated from Douglas College in British Columbia, where he studied criminology. He has also worked in loss prevention and has a third degree black belt in Taekwondo. He and his wife have one son, Gurveer Singh. Harv also attended Douglas College, studying history. He has also worked as a model and actor. Harv appeared in the 2015 movie Brothers. Both brothers appeared in the movie Russell Madness, which also starred fellow professional wrestler John Morrison. Gurv and Harv are both Sikhs.

== Championships and accomplishments ==
- All-Star Wrestling (British Columbia)
  - ASW Tag Team Championship (1 time)
  - King of the Island Tournament (2009) – Gurv
- CanAm Wrestling
  - CanAm Tag Team Championship (1 time)
- DEFY Wrestling
  - Defy Tag Team Championship (1 time)
- Elite Canadian Championship Wrestling
  - ECCW Tag Team Championship (5 times)
  - NWA Pacific Northwest Junior Heavyweight Championship (2 times) – Gurv (1), Harv (1)
  - NWA Canadian Junior Heavyweight Championship (1 time) – Gurv
- Global Force Wrestling
  - GFW Tag Team Championship (1 time)
  - GFW Tag Team Championship Tournament (2015)
- Hamilton Wrestling Entertainment
  - HWE Tag Team Championship (1 time)
- Pro Wrestling Illustrated
  - Gurv/Sunil ranked No. 240 of the top 500 singles wrestlers in the PWI 500 in 2017 and 2019
  - Harv/Samir ranked No. 236 of the top 500 singles wrestlers in the PWI 500 in 2017 and 2019
- Real Canadian Wrestling
  - RCW Tag Team Championship (1 time)
- Ring Ka King
  - RKK Tag Team Championship (1 time)
- Thrash Wrestling
  - Thrash Tag Team Championship (1 time)
- World Series Wrestling
  - WSW Tag Team Championship (1 time)
- WWE
  - WWE 24/7 Championship (9 times) – Sunil (4), Samir (5)
