= WWE in India =

Series of professional wrestling events in India by American promotion WWE

- Created by: Vince McMahon
- Promotions: WWE
- Brands: Raw; SmackDown
- First event: 1996 tour

WWE, an American professional wrestling promotion based in Stamford, Connecticut in the United States has been promoting events in India since 1996 when they were the World Wrestling Federation.

== History ==
WWE first toured the country in 1996. The next time WWE came to India was in November 2002, visiting New Delhi, Mumbai and Bangalore. The company returned to New Delhi in January 2016 for the two days event what was the first WWE event in India in 13 years. On 9 December 2017, an event titled WWE Live India Supershow was held at the Indira Gandhi Indoor Stadium in New Delhi, and aired exclusively on SonyLIV.

WWE had a broadcasting relationship with Sony Sports Network from 2002 to 2025. Alongside broadcasts of its main weekly programs, WWE produced localized programming in Hindi for the region, including WWE Sunday Dhamaal for Sony Max, and WWE Now India with Gaelyn Mendonca for its YouTube channel.

In January 2019, Triple H stated that the WWE would eventually open a Performance Center in India. Two months later, the first ever WWE tryouts in India were held, in which approximately 60 men and 20 women were shortlisted. For Republic Day, 22 January 2021, WWE produced its first televised event special targeting the Indian market, Superstar Spectacle, which featured matches showcasing current and developmental WWE talent of Indian heritage. It was simulcast with English and Hindi commentary across Sony TEN and Sony Max, and aired internationally on WWE Network.

WWE's contract with Sony Pictures Networks lapsed on 1 April 2025, with the Indian market transitioning to WWE's global broadcast deal with Netflix.

A number of WWE performers have also visited India as part of promotional tours.

Superstar	Year
Big Show	2002
John Cena	2006
Kane	2009
Mark Henry	2015
Alberto Del Rio	2016
Kofi Kingston and Big E	2017
Triple H	2017
Braun Strowman	2018
Matt Hardy	2018
The New Day, Kavita Devi, Jeet Rama, Saurav Gurjar, Rinku Singh and Jinny	2019
Charlotte Flair	2019
Drew McIntyre	2022
Rhea Ripley	2023
Bobby Lashley	2023

== Events in India ==
Raw-branded event

Date	Name	Venue	City	Main event
2 February 1996	WWF Tour of India	Andheri Sports Complex	Mumbai, Maharashtra	Bret Hart vs. Tatanka for the WWF World Heavyweight Championship
21 November 2002	WWE Raw Tour of India	Jawaharlal Nehru Stadium	New Delhi	Kane vs. Test
22 November 2002	WWE Raw Tour of India	MMRDA Grounds	Mumbai, Maharashtra	Chris Jericho & Christian vs. Rob Van Dam & Jeff Hardy
23 November 2002	WWE Raw Tour of India	Palace Grounds	Bangalore, Karnataka	Kane vs. Chris Jericho
15 January 2016	WWE Live Tour India 2016	Indira Gandhi Indoor Stadium	New Delhi	Roman Reigns vs. Big Show
16 January 2016	WWE Live Tour India 2016	Indira Gandhi Indoor Stadium	New Delhi	Roman Reigns vs. Rusev
9 December 2017	WWE Live India Supershow	Indira Gandhi Indoor Stadium	New Delhi	Triple H vs. Jinder Mahal
8 September 2023	WWE Superstar Spectacle	G. M. C. Balayogi Indoor Stadium	Hyderabad	John Cena and Seth Rollins vs Giovanni Vinci and Ludwig Kaiser (The Imperium)

== Television series ==
WWE have produced several television series for their Indian audience over the years. Since 27 February 2018, they have aired live telecasts of Raw and SmackDown in Hindi. Live Tamil and Telugu language commentary was introduced in 2021.

On 7 May 2007, a new WWE show for children named WWE 24X7 premiered on Jetix in India, which shown matches from their archives.

WWE started airing taped shows on Ten Sports in January 2015. Through this deal, an exclusive localised Raw recap show was made for the Indian market. The localised Raw show would later be announced as Raw Sunday Dhamaal, a short-lived show which was replaced by WWE Sunday Dhamaal. The show was perceived well with audiences, gaining an 'upward swing' of viewers after it had launched.

From 2015 to 2017, a recap show produced by the WWE named Action Mania, aired on Zee Cinema in Hindi exclusively in India.

In 2020 Sony Pictures launched two Studio shows Blockbusters and Dhamaal League.

=== Other shows ===
Several WWE superstars made special appearances in various shows during their promotional tour in India. Kofi Kingston and Big E appeared on the 10 May 2017 episode of Extraaa Innings T20. Months later, in October 2017, Jinder Mahal appeared in an episode of Sony SAB's sitcom Sajan Re Phir Jhooth Mat Bolo. In 2018, Matt Hardy made a special appearance in singing reality show Indian Idol. In 2019, The New Day appeared on an episode of dance reality show Super Dancer.

== WWE Superstar Spectacle ==
In 2021, WWE taped a special India centric show WWE Superstar Spectacle on 22 January 2021 and aired it on 26 January, the Republic Day of India. The second Superstar Spectacle event was held on 8 September 2023. Unlike the 2021 event, the 2023 event was a house show. It was later aired as Namaste India on Sony Sports Network on 2 October 2023.

== Indian flag controversy ==
A 1999 episode of Sunday Night Heat was criticized for a segment featuring Kurt Angle and Tiger Ali Singh in which Angle blew his nose in the Indian national flag. On 15 January 2016, days before the WWE arrived in India for their house show events in 2016, a group named Aadvanshi Veer Sena threatened to protest against the company's tour unless they apologised for Angle's incident. Five days after their claims to protest if an apology was not given, WWE International's Executive Vice President, Gerrit Meier, apologised for the incident, saying, "This case is about 20-years-ago and we did not deliberately do that. We have a great respect for the country. We are sorry that it happened, but we had no intention of doing it. India is a reputable country and we apologise for this… We are extremely pleased that India is hosting the live events again. There are good number of fans and I am confident that they will enjoy it all. Nearly 14 years later, we are once again on the ground of India will play a WWE match."
