= Nick Aldis =

English professional wrestler (born 1986)

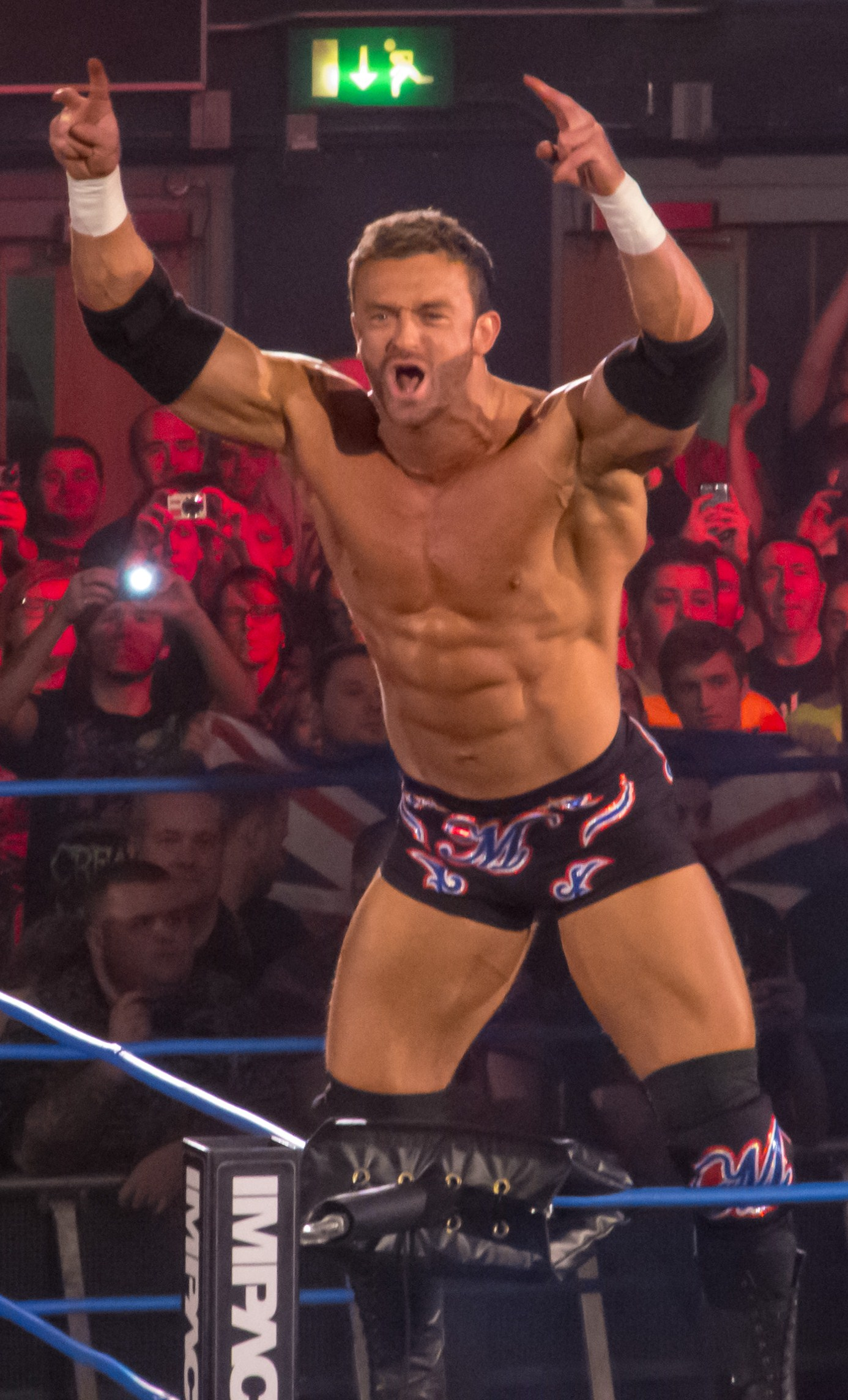
- Aldis in 2013

Personal information
- Born: Nicholas Harry Aldis; 6 November 1986 (age 39) Docking, Norfolk, England
- Spouse: Mickie James (m. 2015)
- Children: 1

Professional wrestling career
- Ring name(s): Brutus Magnus; Magnus; Nick Aldis; Sir Brutus Magnus
- Billed height: 6 ft 4 in (193 cm)
- Billed weight: 242 lb (110 kg)
- Billed from: King's Lynn, England
- Trained by: Dropkixx Academy; Frank Rimer; Harley Race's Wrestling Academy; John Hall; John Ritchie; Ricky Knight; Tony Scarlo; Vince Randell; WAW School
- Debut: 17 December 2004

Nicholas Harry Aldis (born 6 November 1986) is an English professional wrestler and executive. He is signed to WWE, where he is a producer and the on-screen general manager of SmackDown.

Aldis made his debut on the British independent circuit in 2004 before signing with his first major contract with Total Nonstop Action Wrestling (TNA) in 2008. During his seven-year tenure there as Magnus, he won the TNA World Heavyweight Championship once, becoming the first British-born world champion in the company's history along with becoming a three-time tag team champion, winning the TNA World Tag Team Championship twice and the IWGP Tag Team Championship once. At Ring Ka King (RKK) in 2011, he won the RKK World Heavyweight Championship.

Immediately after leaving TNA in 2015, Aldis signed with Global Force Wrestling (GFW), where he was the inaugural GFW Global Champion and subsequently became the longest-reigning champion in the title's history. In 2017, Aldis briefly returned to TNA, which had been renamed as Impact Wrestling, due to their new partnership with GFW, dropping the title and leaving the company later that year. He then signed with the National Wrestling Alliance (NWA) and would soon after win the NWA World's Heavyweight Championship twice, becoming the second British wrestler to hold that championship (after Gary Steele) and making him a four-time world champion in professional wrestling. Aldis then left the NWA in late 2022 and briefly returned to Impact Wrestling in 2023 before departing the company in July. He subsequently began working behind-the-scenes for WWE in August and became the on-screen general manager of the SmackDown brand in October that year; after three years with the company, he had his WWE in-ring debut match at SummerSlam in August 2026.

Aldis also appeared in the 2008 revival of Gladiators, where he was known as Oblivion. He was also a co-presenter of Britain's Strongest Man on Challenge TV.

== Early life ==
Nicholas Harry Aldis was born on 6 November 1986 in Docking, Norfolk. Before training to be a wrestler, Aldis became proficient in swimming and tennis; he then began bodybuilding, which ultimately led to him becoming a professional wrestler. In 2008 he made several appearances on Gladiators under the name "Oblivion" along with fellow professional wrestler Mason Ryan under the name "Goliath".

== Professional wrestling career ==
=== Early career (2004–2008) ===
After beginning his training at the age of 16, Aldis made his professional debut on 17 December 2004 for the British Wrestling Promotion Dropkixx Wrestling (DKW), losing to Charlie Rage.

Early title matches included a DAM Promotions event where Aldis teamed up with Bash to take on the DAM Tag Team Champions Big Dave and The Bulk for the titles and he also went up against Ashe for the LDN Championship at Summit Wrestling, he would lose both matches. In 2007, he would face the WAW British Heavyweight Champion Brett Meadows for the title and lost. His last match before joining TNA was a win against Marty Scurll. During his time in England he wrestled primarily at All Star Wrestling and World Association of Wrestling.

=== Total Nonstop Action Wrestling (2008–2015) ===
==== Early feuds (2008–2009) ====
In November 2008, Aldis signed with Total Nonstop Action Wrestling (TNA). On 11 December 2008 episode of Impact!, TNA started airing vignettes of Aldis' debut under the name Brutus Magnus, a modern-day gladiator.

Aldis competed under his Brutus Magnus name and gimmick at the TNA Maximum Impact! Tour in Glasgow, Scotland on 22 January 2009, where he defeated Matt Morgan. Two days later on the last night of the tour, Magnus defeated Sheik Abdul Bashir in London at the Wembley Arena. On 29 January episode of Impact!, another vignette of Magnus was played and it stated that Magnus' debut would occur next week. He debuted on 5 February episode of Impact! as a villainous character, defeating Shark Boy with his finishing move, the Tormentum. After the match, he issued an open challenge to anyone on the TNA roster. Chris Sabin answered the open challenge at Against All Odds, which Magnus also won. This continued with another victory against Eric Young at Destination X.

==== The British Invasion (2009–2011) ====
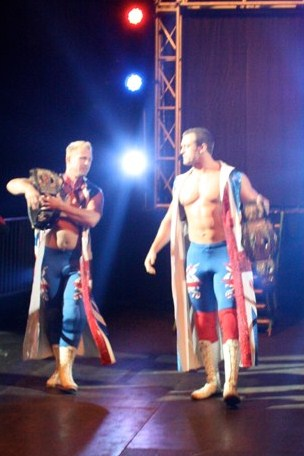
Magnus (right), one half of The British Invasion as TNA World Tag Team Champions

On 30 April 2009 episode of Impact!, Magnus dropped the gladiator character and formed a villainous group called The British Invasion with fellow British wrestlers Doug Williams and Rob Terry. In their debut match as a team, Williams and Magnus defeated Homicide in a two-on-one handicap match after assaulting his tag team partner Hernandez backstage prior to the match, and stealing his Feast or Fired briefcase. The Invasion has since formed an alliance called World Elite with Eric Young, Sheik Abdul Bashir and Kiyoshi and engaged in a feud with Team 3D over the IWGP Tag Team Championship. On 30 July episode of Impact!, Magnus and Williams won the IWGP Tag Team Championship by defeating Team 3D in a Tables match. However, New Japan Pro-Wrestling later stated that as the title change did not occur with the sanction of the promotion, they still recognised Team 3D as the official champions. On 10 August 2009, NJPW formally recognised the title switch. At Bound for Glory, the British Invasion lost the IWGP Tag Team Championship back to Team 3D, but managed to win the TNA World Tag Team Championship in a four way Full Metal Mayhem Tag Team match against Booker T and Scott Steiner, Team 3D and Beer Money, Inc. (James Storm and Robert Roode). The following month at Turning Point Magnus and Williams successfully defended the title in a three-way match against Beer Money and The Motor City Machine Guns (Alex Shelley and Chris Sabin). At Final Resolution they were once again able to retain their title in a match against Shelley and Sabin. At Genesis the British Invasion lost the TNA World Tag Team Titles to Matt Morgan and Hernandez. Afterwards, Magnus and Williams began abusing Terry and blaming him for their losses. On 18 February 2010 episode of Impact!, Terry finally grew tired of this and attacked Magnus, thus ending his alliance with the British Invasion and completing his fan favourite turn. At Destination X 2010, Magnus announced that from now on he would be known only by the name Magnus. He then went on to lose to his former mate and wrestling partner Rob Terry in a match for the Global Championship.

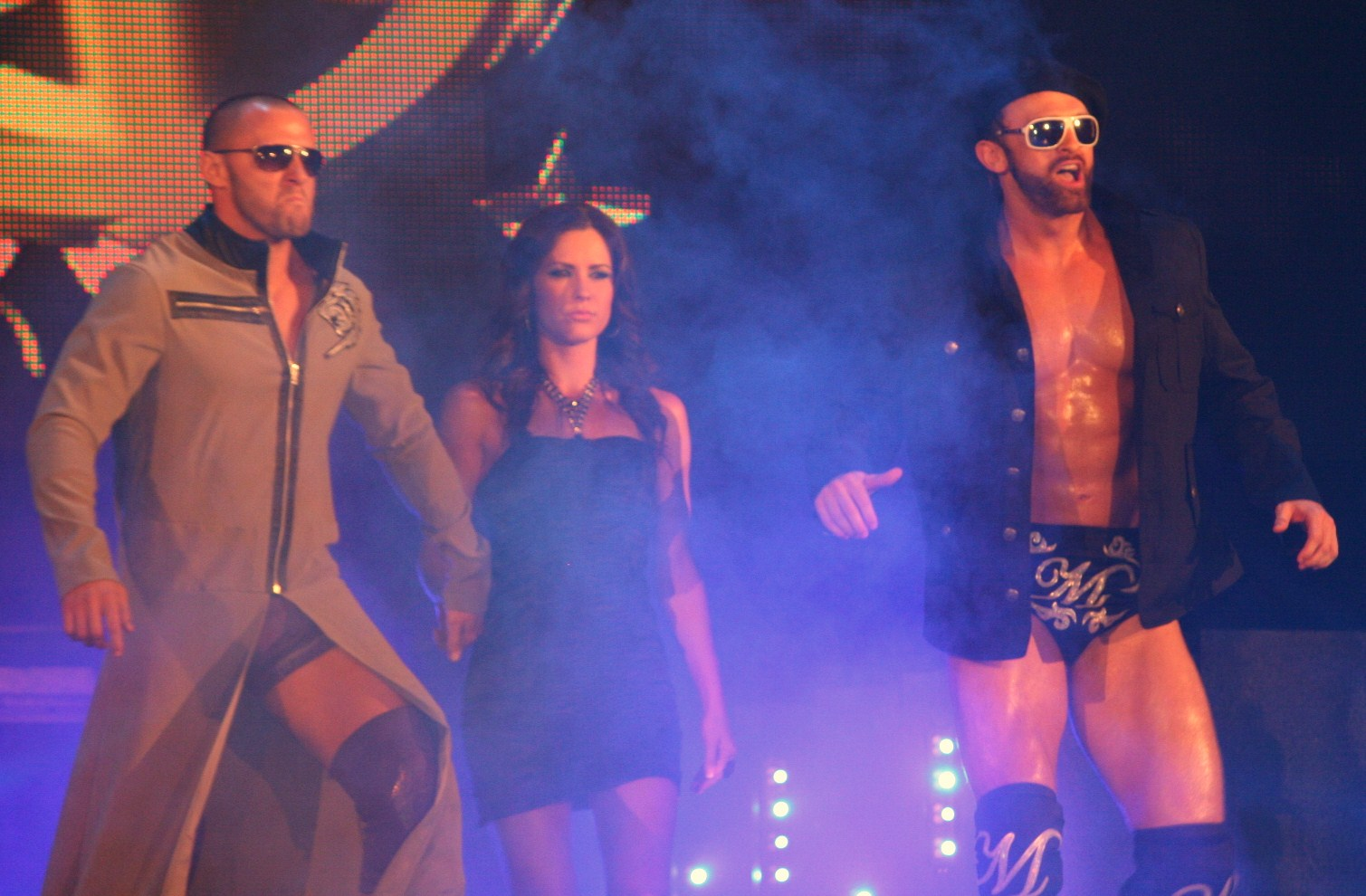
Magnus (right) with Desmond Wolfe and his valet Chelsea in July 2010

After not being seen for over three months, Magnus returned on 14 June at the tapings of Xplosion, defeating Suicide and afterward challenging Rob Terry to a rematch for the Global Championship. The rematch took place at 29 June tapings of Xplosion, with Terry retaining his Global Championship. On 3 July 2010, Dixie Carter announced that Aldis had signed a new long-term contract with TNA. On the edition of 14 July 2010 of TNA Today, Aldis debuted a new charming but promiscuous gimmick. He then went on to form a tag team with Desmond Wolfe, with the two of them defeating Amazing Red and Suicide in their first match together at 13 July tapings of Xplosion. At the 26 and 27 July tapings of Xplosion Magnus and Wolfe defeated the teams of Hernandez and Rob Terry and Ink Inc. (Jesse Neal and Shannon Moore) in a four tag team tournament to earn the right to challenge for the TNA World Tag Team Championship. On 26 August episode of Impact! the tag team of Magnus and Wolfe was named London Brawling. They were scheduled to receive their shot at The Motor City Machine Guns and the TNA World Tag Team Championship at No Surrender, but were at the last minute pulled from the event, with TNA citing a "personal issue" as the reason. It was later reported that Wolfe had been sidelined due to an undisclosed medical situation. Magnus returned to working live events on 30 September.

On 16 December, Magnus made his first appearance on Impact! in three months, when he met his former tag team partner Douglas Williams and informed him that Wolfe was close to a comeback. On 30 December episode of Impact! Magnus offered to team up with Williams in a tag team match, where they were defeated by Fortune members A.J. Styles and Rob Terry. Magnus reappeared as a heel on 24 February 2011 episode of Impact!, in a match, where he was defeated by Crimson. On 31 March episode of Impact!, Magnus and Douglas Williams officially reformed the British Invasion once again as a heel group by attacking the team of Eric Young and Orlando Jordan. In their first match back together, Magnus and Williams were defeated by Ink Inc. on 12 April, on Xplosion. On 17 April at Lockdown, Magnus and Williams were defeated again by Ink Inc. in a four tag team number one contenders' steel cage match. Despite not having won a match since their reformation, the British Invasion received a TNA World Tag Team Championship match at Slammiversary IX, which they lost to James Storm and Alex Shelley. On 30 June, Magnus and Williams turned face by responding to Mexican America's bad remarks by praising the United States. They were then attacked until Rob Terry returned to save them, effectively adding him back to the group. On 14 July episode of Impact Wrestling, Mexican America's Anarquia and Hernandez defeated Magnus and Williams in a TNA World Tag Team Championship number one contender's match, following outside interference from their stablemate Rosita. At 9 August tapings of Xplosion, Magnus defeated Alex Shelley in the finals of a sixteen-man Xplosion Championship Challenge tournament to earn the right to challenge for the title of his choosing.

==== Teaming and feuding with Samoa Joe (2011–2012) ====
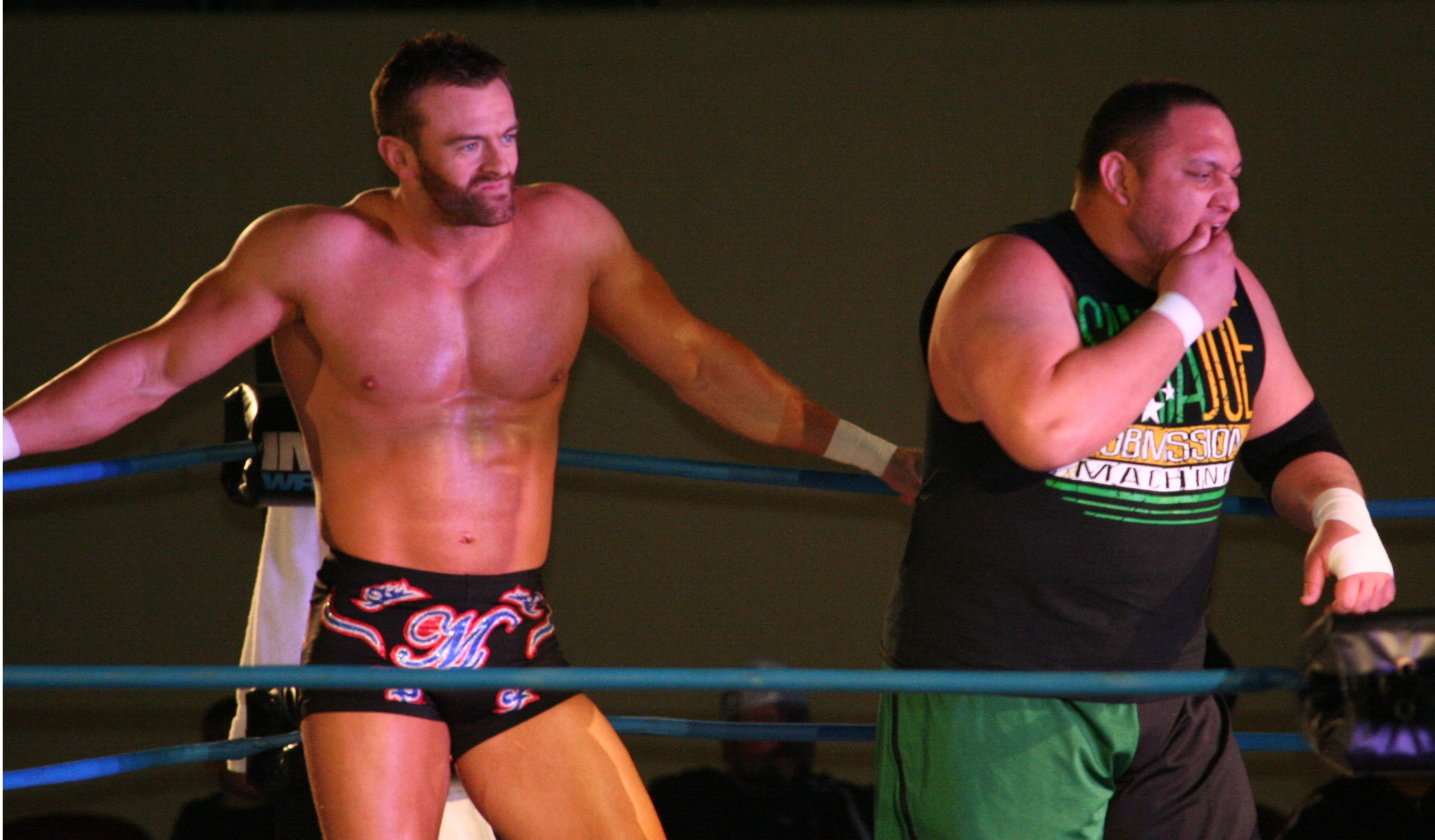
Magnus (left) and Samoa Joe in March 2012

In December 2011, Magnus began teaming up with Samoa Joe to take part in the Wild Card Tournament. On 5 January 2012 episode of Impact Wrestling, Magnus and Samoa Joe defeated A.J. Styles and Kazarian to win the four-week-long Wild Card Tournament and become the number one contenders to the TNA World Tag Team Championship. Three days later at Genesis, Magnus and Joe failed to capture the TNA World Tag Team Championship from Crimson and Matt Morgan. Despite the loss, Magnus and Joe remained together as a tag team, attacking Crimson and Morgan on the next two episodes of Impact Wrestling.

On 2 February, Magnus and Joe defeated Crimson and Morgan in a non-title match to earn another shot at the TNA World Tag Team Championship, and at Against All Odds, Magnus and Joe defeated Crimson and Morgan to win the TNA World Tag Team Championship. Magnus and Joe then defeated Crimson and Morgan in two rematches in February and March and Mexican America (Anarquia and Hernandez) in March to retain the championship. On 15 April at Lockdown, Magnus and Joe defeated The Motor City Machine Guns in a steel cage match to retain the TNA World Tag Team Championship. During the first "Open Fight Night" on 26 April, Magnus and Joe successfully defended the TNA World Tag Team Championship against the team of Jeff Hardy and Mr. Anderson, after which they were attacked by Christopher Daniels and Kazarian, who had asked for a title shot earlier in the event. On 13 May at Sacrifice, Magnus and Joe lost the TNA World Tag Team Championship to Daniels and Kazarian.

On 14 June episode of Impact Wrestling, Magnus entered the 2012 Bound for Glory Series, taking part in the opening gauntlet match, from which he was eliminated by Samoa Joe. Magnus' participation in the tournament ended on 16 August episode of Impact Wrestling, when he was defeated by Joe in a singles match, leaving him outside a spot in the semifinals. Afterwards, Magnus would attack Joe after the latter offered a sign of respect, turning heel in the process. On 14 October at Bound for Glory, Magnus unsuccessfully challenged Joe for his TNA Television Championship.

==== The New Main Event Mafia (2012–2013) ====
On 1 November episode of Impact Wrestling, Magnus challenged Joe to a rematch as part of the Open Fight Night, however, he lost the match via disqualification, after hitting Joe with a wrench. The rivalry culminated in a No Disqualification match on 11 November at Turning Point, where Magnus was again unsuccessful in winning the title. On the following episode of Impact Wrestling, Magnus was sidelined with a storyline injury after he was ambushed by the Aces & Eights and hit in both his knees with a ball-peen hammer.

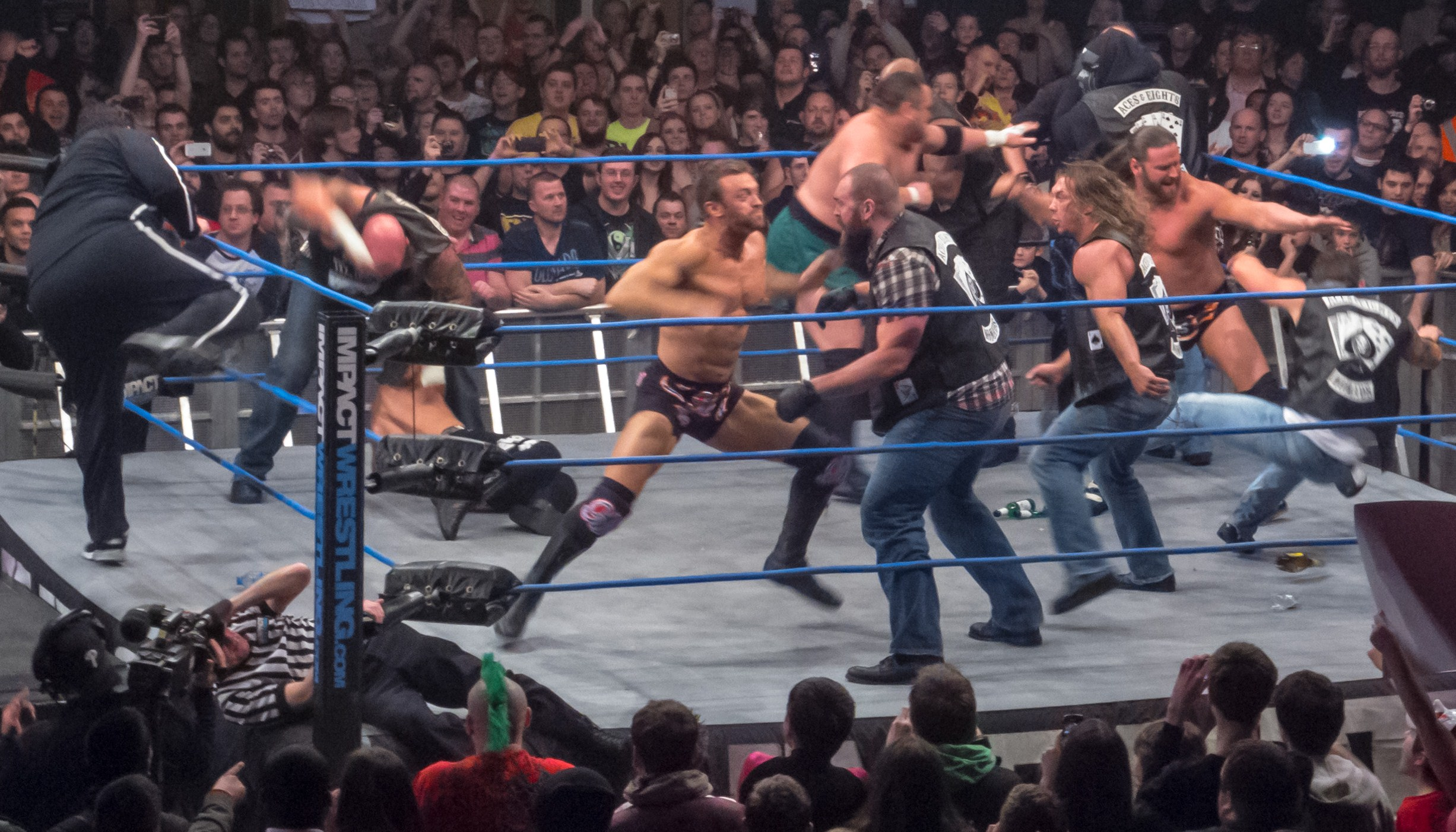
Magnus and the rest of TNA roster brawl with Aces & Eights

Magnus returned as a fan favourite on 31 January 2013 episode of Impact Wrestling in Manchester, England, interrupting and attacking Bad Influence (Christopher Daniels and Kazarian) who were insulting the country. Afterwards, Magnus wrestled his return match, defeating TNA Television Champion Devon in a non-title match via disqualification after interference from the Aces & Eights. At Lockdown in March, Team TNA, consisting of Magnus, Eric Young, James Storm, Samoa Joe, and Sting defeated Aces & Eights, consisting of Devon, DOC, Garett Bischoff, Knux, and Mr. Anderson in a Lethal Lockdown match. On 21 March episode of Impact Wrestling, Magnus was defeated by Jeff Hardy in a four-way number one contenders match for the World Heavyweight Championship, which also included Kurt Angle and Samoa Joe. On 18 April episode of Impact Wrestling, Magnus was scheduled to face Devon for his Television Championship, however, was attacked by DOC and Knux before the match could start. Magnus returned on 9 May episode of Impact Wrestling, defeating DOC after an inadvertent distraction from D'Lo Brown. Later that night, Magnus was again attacked by the Aces & Eights. At Slammiversary XI, Magnus teamed with Jeff Hardy and Samoa Joe in a winning effort against Aces & Eights (Garett Bischoff, Mr. Anderson, and Wes Brisco).

On 13 June episode of Impact Wrestling, Magnus defeated Kenny King, Matt Morgan, and Rob Terry in a four-way match to qualify for the 2013 Bound for Glory Series. The following week, Magnus defeated Kazarian in his first Bound for Glory Series match via submission to earn ten points and take an early lead in the tournament. On 4 July episode of Impact Wrestling, Magnus was named the fourth member of the newly reformed Main Event Mafia along with Kurt Angle, Sting, and former tag team partner and rival Samoa Joe. On 12 September episode of Impact Wrestling, Magnus defeated Roode in a Bound For Glory Series Final Four match to advance before ultimately losing to A.J. Styles in the finals.

After the Bound for Glory Series, Magnus began a feud with Bad Influence, who assaulted him during the finals, and first challenged them to a six-man tag team match against himself, Sting and Samoa Joe, prior to the match Bad Influence incapacitated Magnus and injured his knee, but Sting and Joe emerged victorious. In the aftermath, Magnus announced he was going to take on all three members of Bad Influence himself in a gauntlet match. During the gauntlet, Magnus defeated Kazarian and Christopher Daniels, but was defeated by Bobby Roode, who took advantage of his injured knee and made him submit. After the match Magnus began venting his frustrations around the ring before Sting came out to calm him down, which culminated in Sting offering Magnus a match against him at Bound for Glory, which Magnus accepted. Magnus defeated Sting at Bound for Glory after Sting tapped out to the King's Lynn Cloverleaf.

==== TNA World Heavyweight Champion (2013–2014) ====
On 21 November 2013 episode of Impact Wrestling, Magnus was entered into a tournament to crown a new TNA World Heavyweight Champion after the title was vacated. He defeated Samoa Joe in a Falls Count Anywhere match at Turning Point and Kurt Angle on Impact Wrestling to advance to the finals. He defeated Jeff Hardy in a Dixieland match to become the new TNA World Heavyweight Champion on 3 December; the match aired on 19 December, on Impact Wrestling: Final Resolution. In the process, he turned heel by joining Team Dixie and allying himself with Dixie Carter, Ethan Carter III, and Rockstar Spud.

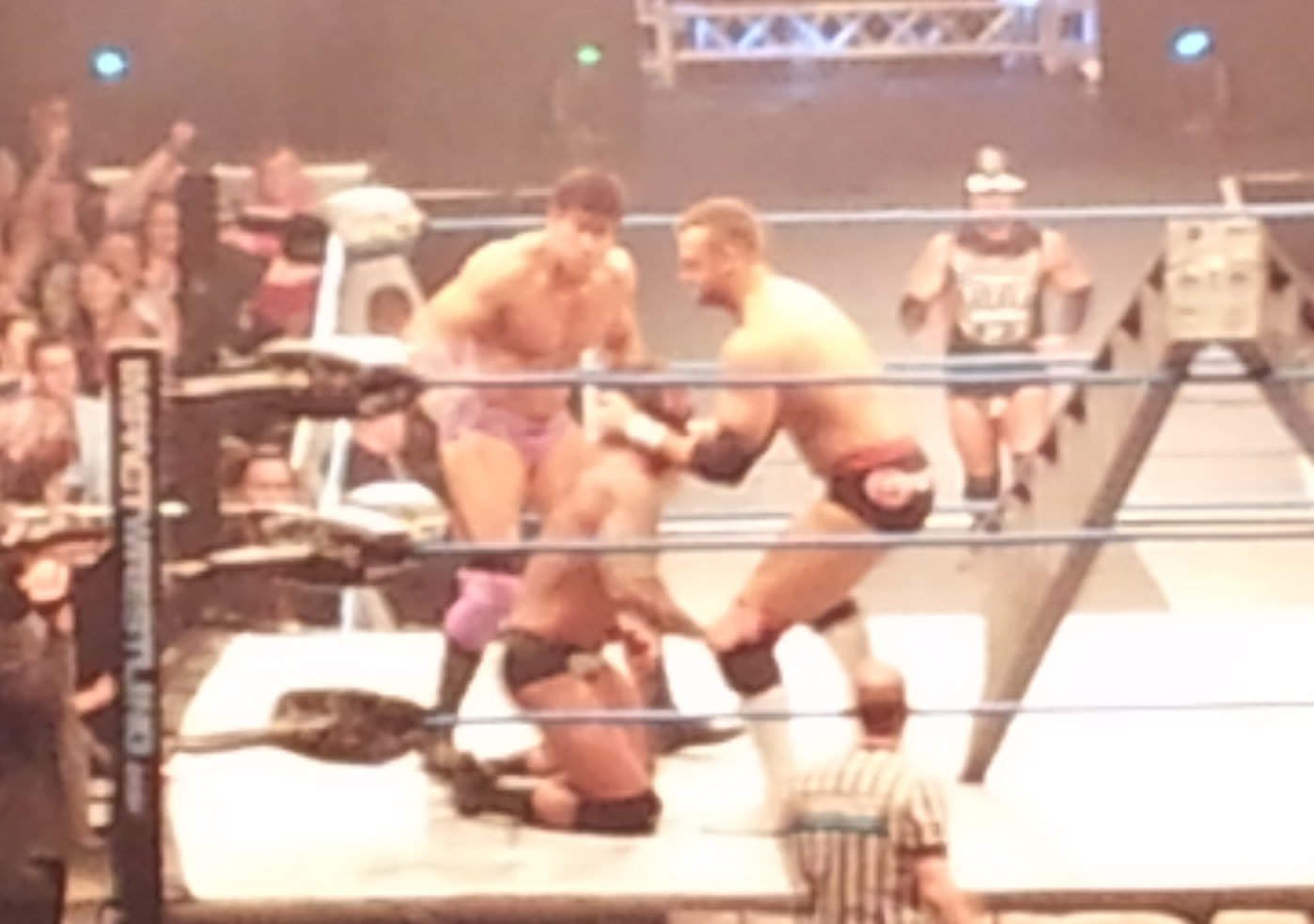
Magnus and Ethan Carter III attacked Gunner

Styles returned on the edition of 2 January 2014 of Impact Wrestling still claiming to be the legitimate champion as he was never defeated for the title. He then lost to Magnus due to TNA President Dixie Carter directing a heavy amount of interference against Styles, making Magnus undisputed champion. Samoa Joe then stepped up to challenge Magnus, labelling him a "paper champion". On 9 January 2014 episode of Impact Wrestling, Magnus defeated A.J. Styles in a no disqualification title unification match after Styles had returned to TNA with his own TNA World Heavyweight Championship; Styles left TNA after the match. The next week, Magnus defeated Sting in a no disqualification title match to end Sting's TNA career.

On 30 January episode of Impact Wrestling, Samoa Joe and Kurt Angle defeated Magnus and Ethan Carter III in a stipulated tag match. In the match, Joe forced Magnus to tap out and as a result of the stipulation put in place, he would receive a shot at the TNA World Heavyweight Championship. On 2 March, Magnus successfully defended the TNA World Heavyweight Championship in Tokyo, Japan, defeating Kai at Wrestle-1's Kaisen: Outbreak event. At Lockdown, Magnus successfully defended his TNA World Heavyweight Championship against Samoa Joe. On 3 April, Magnus successfully defended his TNA World Heavyweight Championship against Samoa Joe, Eric Young and Abyss. On 8 April, Director of Wrestling Operations MVP announced a 10-man gauntlet match that took place on 10 April episode of Impact Wrestling where the winner would receive a future TNA World Heavyweight Championship that same night. The match would later be won by Eric Young who requested to have his shot at the same night, in which Magnus lost the TNA World Heavyweight Championship to Young. At Sacrifice, Magnus received a rematch for the title, but was again defeated by Young.

==== Later feuds (2014–2015) ====
Shortly after his loss to Eric Young, Magnus began a losing streak, after losing out on a number one contender's spot for the championship Magnus was met in a backstage segment by his childhood friend and fellow Brit Bram, who began to chastise him, claiming he had gone soft. Over the next several weeks, Magnus began showing signs of a face turn when Bram would throw weapons into the ring and encourage him to let out a more intense side but Magnus would refuse. More signs began to show from Magnus when he first attacked Bram in a backstage segment, and then when Magnus saved Tigre Uno from an assault from Bram the following week. On the edition of 5 June of Impact Wrestling, it looked as though Magnus would finalise his face turn and save Willow from Bram, but would in fact remain heel and attack Willow himself with a steel pry bar. Since developing a more violent persona, Magnus and Bram began a rivalry with Willow and the returning Abyss. Magnus defeated Willow on 15 June 2014, at Slammiversary XII. On 26 June 2014, episode of Impact Wrestling Magnus and Bram defeated Willow and Abyss in a tag team Monster's Ball match. On 20 August 2014, at Hardcore Justice, Magnus was a participant in a six-sides of steel match to determine a number 1 contender for the TNA World Heavyweight Championship, the match was ultimately won by Eric Young and Bobby Roode.

On 23 January 2015, episode of Impact Wrestling, Magnus competed in the Feast or Fired match grabbing the final case which contained a TNA World Tag Team Championship title opportunity, in which Bram claimed to have been the one to obtain it for himself but the chance was stolen from Magnus. On 30 January episode of Impact Wrestling, Magnus tried to reconcile with Bram in a bar, but after leaving the bar he was then viciously attacked by Bram, which would turn Magnus face once again. The following week Mickie James, (Magnus's real-life fiancé) returned to TNA to confront Bram who threatened Mickie in return. The week after, Magnus returned and attacked Bram in retaliation for threatening Mickie. This would lead to a match between the two which Magnus won by disqualification after Magnus was strapped to the ropes, after which Mickie ran down to the ring and was grabbed by Bram who forced Magnus to kiss his boot, to which he obliged. Magnus would get redemption and attack Bram backstage. This would lead to a No Disqualification match between the two which Magnus won to end the feud.

Magnus would enter into a storyline with James Storm who intervened in his final match with Bram by saving Mickie James from being attacked. On 24 April episode of Impact Wrestling, Magnus and Mickie James both came down to the ring to announce Mickie's retirement from professional wrestling to focus on raising their son but were interrupted by Storm who managed to convince her not to. Magnus was later approached backstage by Davey Richards (who had previously feuded with Storm) who warned Magnus not to trust Storm, after which Magnus asked a member of the camera crew to follow Mickie around to keep an eye on her. After consulting the footage the crew gathered, Magnus confronted Storm and warned him to stay out of his and Mickie's business. The following week the two would have another confrontation where Storm would push Magnus too far and provoked him to attack Storm with a guitar officially igniting their feud. The following week on Impact Wrestling, Magnus called out Storm for a fight to instead be met by former rival and Storm's Revolution teammate Abyss and eventually the rest of The Revolution members Manik and Khoya. At Slammiversary XIII, Magnus faced James Storm in a losing effort. On 29 July episode of Impact Wrestling, Magnus and Mickie James defeated James Storm and Serena in a mixed tag match. On 29 June 2015, TNA announced that Magnus was released from the TNA, after nearly 8 years with the company.

=== Pro Wrestling Noah (2012) ===
On 22 July 2012, Magnus made his debut for the Japanese Pro Wrestling Noah promotion, when he and Samoa Joe defeated Akitoshi Saito and Jun Akiyama to win the GHC Tag Team Championship. On 8 October, Magnus and Joe lost the title to KENTA and Maybach Taniguchi in their first defence.

=== Global Force Wrestling (2015–2017) ===
On 29 June 2015, it was announced that Aldis had signed with Global Force Wrestling, and will compete under his real name. On 9 July, Aldis made his in-ring debut defeating Tommaso Ciampa as part of the inaugural GFW Grand Slam Tour. On 10 July 2015, Aldis faced Kongo Kong as part of the GFW Grand Slam Tour in Erie, Pennsylvania making this their first of three matches during the tour which saw him winning on all three occasions.

On 24 July 2015, Aldis entered into a tournament to crown the inaugural GFW Global Champion, defeating Kongo Kong in the quarterfinals of the tournament. On 5 September, Aldis defeated Chris Mordetzky in the semifinals to advance to the finals of the tournament.

On 23 October 2015, at the GFW Amped taping, Aldis defeated Bobby Roode in the finals of the tournament to become the first ever GFW Global Champion. On 28 October, Aldis and Doug Williams reunited as The British Invasion as part of Global Force Wrestling's GFW UK Invasion tour, defeating Marty Scurll and Rampage Brown. Aldis lost the title on 22 April 2017 to Alberto El Patrón.

=== Return to Total Nonstop Action Wrestling (2017) ===
Following Jeff Jarrett's hiring as TNA's executive consultant in January 2017 and promotion to executive producer and chief creative officer status a month later by its new owners Anthem Sports & Entertainment, GFW talent and championships started being featured on TNA (renamed Impact Wrestling in March) television. Aldis returned on 6 April episode of Impact! under the Magnus ring name as a fan favourite, helping to save Matt Morgan from a 4-on-1 attack by Team Josh Mathews (Bram, Eli Drake, Lashley, and Tyrus), beating down Bram and, in the process, being revealed as Team Jeremy Borash's 4th member, joining Chris Adonis, Morgan and Alberto El Patrón, that would battle the aforementioned foursome. The two sides squared off on the following episode of Impact!, with Magnus getting the pinfall victory on Bram.

Over the next two TV airings, Magnus exhibited villain-type arrogance during backstage segments, by verbally putting himself over, berating other wrestlers, especially El Patrón, and proclaiming himself number one contender for the Impact World Championship. On 4 May episode of Impact!, Magnus successfully defended the GFW Global Championship against Matt Morgan following a low-blow and Michinoku Driver. On 11 May episode of Impact!, Magnus lost the GFW Global Championship to El Patrón via submission to the cross armbreaker. Magnus then acted as guest commentator during a match between Ethan Carter III and James Storm the following week on Impact! and got involved himself in the post-match melee between the two wrestlers, beating and leaving Storm laying by the ring steps then entering the ring to argue with Carter. Consequently, Impact authority figure Bruce Prichard booked the three rivals in a triple threat match for an opportunity at the Impact World Heavyweight Championship. This match took place on 25 May episode of Impact!, where Magnus lost to Carter.

The Wrestling Observer Newsletter reported on 20 July that Aldis rejected a contract offer from Anthem, who had purchased and merged Jarrett's promotion with Impact Wrestling (renaming the company GFW) on 20 April and that he only worked April's Impact! tapings on a handshake deal to protect the lineage of the GFW Global Championship by transitioning it to El Patrón. On 26 July edition of sports writer Chris Featherstone's Pancakes and Powerslams podcast, Aldis cited the lack of financial compensation and creative challenge GFW would offer him as his reasons for not signing. He added that "it's not a contract that anyone with any value, any sense of self-value or self-worth would sign...There's no point in signing a contract to make you exclusive to one place if you're not getting anything in return". He said he was willing to continue working for the company as an independent contractor on handshake agreements, but he was rebuffed.

=== National Wrestling Alliance (2017–2022) ===
On 23 September 2017, Aldis made his debut for Championship Wrestling from Hollywood, defeating Will Roode. Immediately following the match Aldis set forth a challenge to Tim Storm for the NWA World's Heavyweight Championship. That match took place on 12 November and saw Storm retain the title; this was the first title match under the new NWA regime headed by Billy Corgan. On 9 December, Aldis defeated Storm in a rematch at Cage of Death 19 to become the new NWA World Heavyweight Champion, making him the second British-born champion after Gary Steele. The same evening, retired NWA star Austin Idol made a surprise return to professional wrestling as Aldis' corner and spokesman.

Now working as a solidly "tweener" character, Aldis' primary angle was that of a traveling champion who actively accepts all challengers in a bid to raise the profile of the title and bring back some of its lost prestige. His first major story as champion was known as "The Aldis Crusade," a self-imposed mission to undertake twenty title defences over the course of sixty days across three continents in the spring of 2018, concluding with a title defence against Colt Cabana in Wenzhou, China. That summer, Billy Corgan made an announcement at the All In press conference, naming Cody Rhodes as the new challenger for the title at the 1 September event. To promote the match, Aldis wrestled two matches in Ring of Honor: on 24 May 2018 he and Mark Haskins were defeated by The Young Bucks, and at Honor For All, Aldis would successfully retained the NWA World Championship against Flip Gordon. On 1 September 2018, Aldis lost the title to Cody at All In.

On 21 October 2018, at the NWA 70th Anniversary Show, Nick Aldis beat Cody to regain the NWA World's Heavyweight Championship. On 24 November, Aldis successfully defended the title against Jake Hager at WrestleCade: SuperShow. Other challengers have included Cowboy James Storm, Jimmy Havoc, Leland Race (son of Harley), and Marty Scurll. Aldis retained the title throughout 2019, leading into the October debut of the weekly Powerrr studio streaming show, which he headlined as champion and on the first episode of which retained the title against Tim Storm. At Into The Fire, Aldis successfully defended the title against James Storm in a 2-out-of-3 Falls match. On the next episode of Powerrr on 17 December, Aldis turned full heel when he aligned with The Wild Cards (Thomas Latimer and Royce Isaacs) and led an attack on Tim Storm. Kamille looked to have come to Storm's aid but would instead join the beatdown and aligned with the three men. This foursome would go on to be called Strictly Business.

Shortly after forming the new faction, Aldis retained the title against Ricky Morton on Powerrr and Villain Enterprises' Flip Gordon at Hard Times, which set up a title defense for Aldis against Gordon's teammate Marty Scurll at Crockett Cup, a rematch between the two from the previous year's Crockett Cup. In preparation for the title match, Aldis appeared at ROH's Free Enterprise, where he teamed with Rush against Scurll and PCO in a losing effort. Crockett Cup was cancelled due to the COVID-19 pandemic and the rematch never came to fruition due to Scurll leaving ROH amid allegations of the Speaking Out movement. NWA did not hold any events throughout 2020 but Aldis defended the title on a few occasions during the fall of the year.

NWA resumed hosting events with Back For The Attack on 21 March 2021, where Aldis retained the title against Aron Stevens in the main event. In the weeks following the event, the recently debuted Chris Adonis joined Strictly Business as its newest member. The group immediately began feuding with Trevor Murdoch, who won a battle royal to face Aldis for the title at When Our Shadows Fall, where Aldis retained the title after Murdoch got disqualified. Aldis retained the title against Murdoch in a rematch at T-Mart Promotions event The Gathering II on 24 July. However, Murdoch earned another opportunity against Aldis after his team won the Champions Series on Powerrr. The subsequent Title vs Career match for Aldis' championship and Murdoch's career match took place at the NWA 73rd Anniversary Show, where Aldis lost the NWA World's Heavyweight Championship to Murdoch, ending his reign at 1,043 days.

On 6 November 2022, Aldis announced on his Instagram for his subscribers that he requested a release from NWA. As Aldis was publicly critical about the direction of the company, he was later suspended by NWA. Aldis pointed the new direction of the promotion as the reason to leave NWA.

=== Second return to Impact Wrestling (2022–2023) ===
While still employed by the NWA, Aldis returned to Impact Wrestling on 1 April 2022 for the Multiverse of Matches event, teaming with Mickie James to compete against Matt Cardona and Chelsea Green. He also appeared at Slammiversary 2022 on 19 June 2022.

After leaving the NWA, Aldis would return to Impact Wrestling at Rebellion. After winning at Against All Odds in an 8–4–1 match to become the number one contender for the Impact World Championship, he faced champion Alex Shelley at Slammiversary, but was defeated. On 16 July, it was reported that Aldis was officially done with Impact Wrestling. He competed in his final match with the company on the 27 August tapings of Impact in a losing effort against Eric Young.

=== WWE (2023–present) ===
In August 2023, Aldis began working with WWE as a backstage producer. Two months later on the 13 October episode of SmackDown, WWE's chief content officer and head of creative Paul "Triple H" Levesque introduced Aldis as the new on-screen general manager of the SmackDown brand. On the 28 April 2025 episode of Raw, Aldis filled in for Adam Pearce as the on-screen general manager for the Raw brand due to Pearce being forced to miss the show because of "doctor's orders". In June 2026, Aldis began a feud with Gunther after the latter accused the former of mistreatment. This led to Aldis costing Gunther an Undisputed WWE Championship opportunity at Saturday Night's Main Event XLV on 18 July, and a physical altercation between the two the following day at Fanatics Fest on the SummerSlam Kickoff Show. At Night 1 of SummerSlam on 1 August, Aldis wrestled his first match in nearly three years and his first match in WWE, where he lost to Gunther. After the match, Levesque reinstated Aldis as the SmackDown general manager after Aldis stepped down from the position to face Gunther.

== Personal life ==
Aldis married American professional wrestler Mickie James on 31 December 2015. They have a son who was born in 2014.

== Filmography ==
Year	Title	Role	Notes
2008–2009	Gladiators	Oblivion	
2009	Are You Smarter Than a 10 Year Old?	Oblivion	
2012	UK's Strongest Man 2012	Himself	Presenter
2013	UK's Strongest Man 2013	Himself	Presenter

== Championships and accomplishments ==
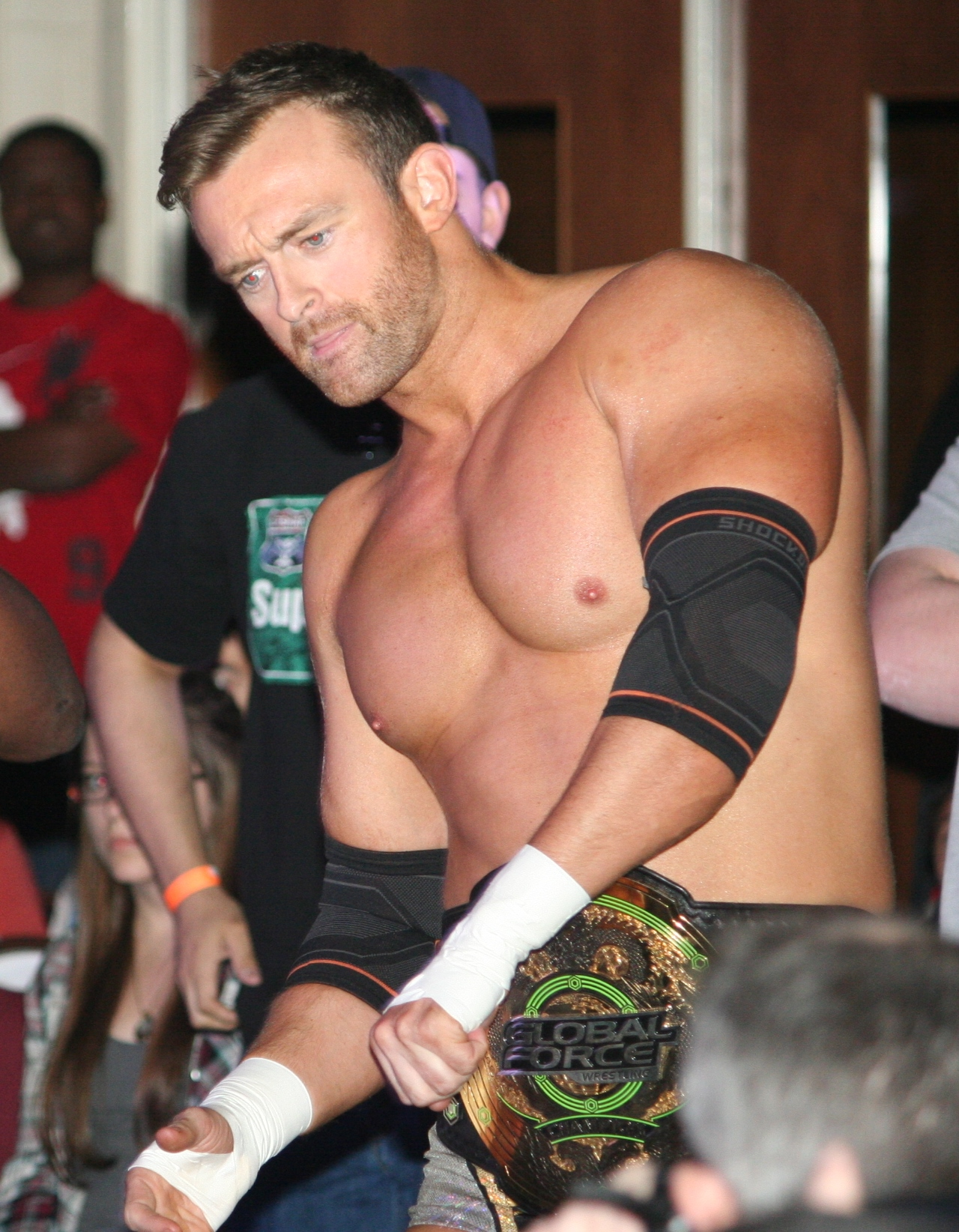
Aldis as the GFW Global Champion in 2016

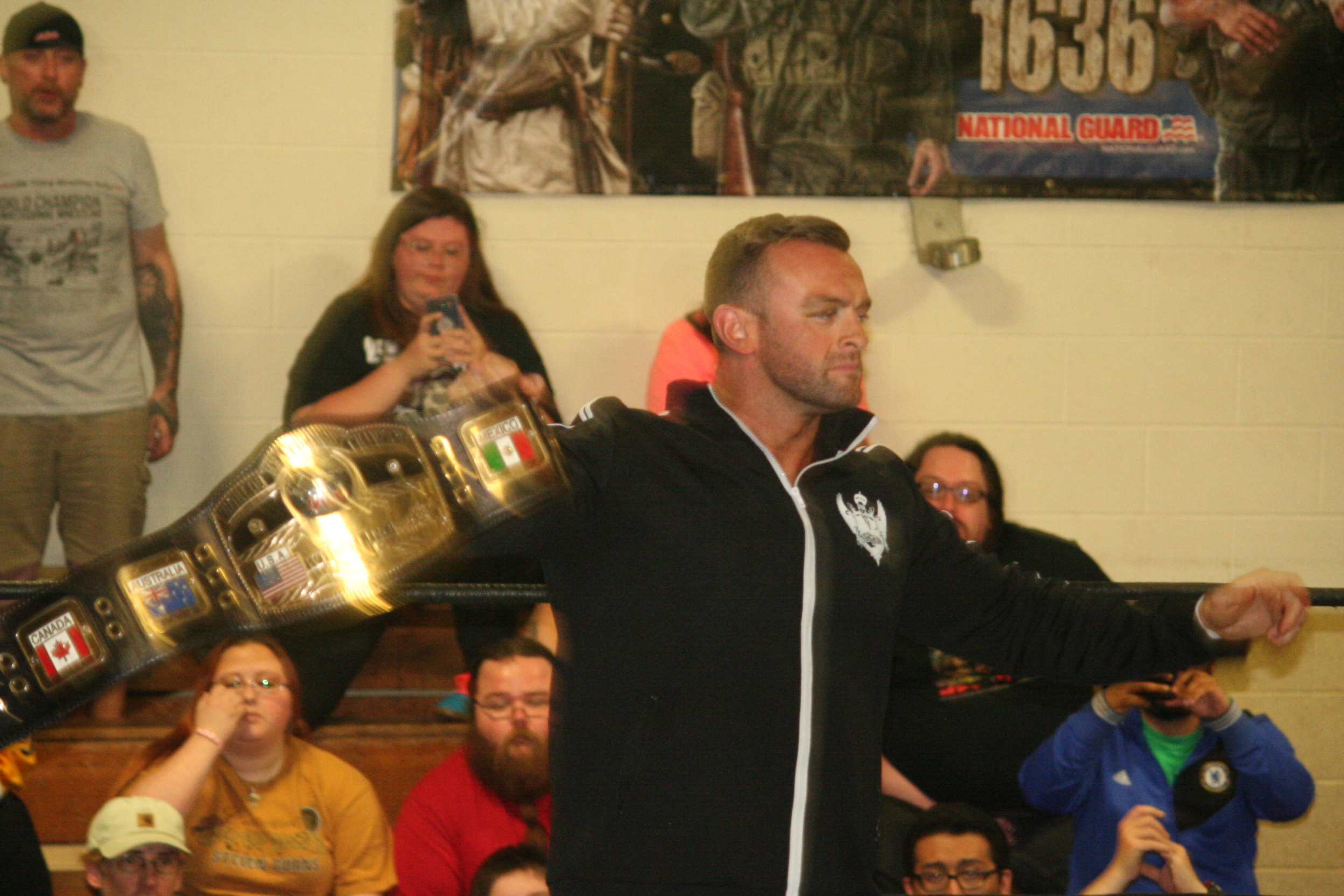
Aldis as the NWA World Heavyweight Champion in April 2018

- Championship Wrestling International
  - CWI Heavyweight Championship (1 time, final)
- Dungeon Wrestling
  - Stu Hart Heritage Championship (1 time)
- Global Force Wrestling
  - GFW Global Championship (1 time)
  - GFW Global Championship Tournament (2015)
- National Wrestling Alliance
  - NWA World's Heavyweight Championship (2 times)
- New Japan Pro-Wrestling
  - IWGP Tag Team Championship (1 time) – with Doug Williams
- North American Wrestling Allegiance
  - NAWA Texas Championship (1 time)
- Pro Wrestling Illustrated
  - Most Improved Wrestler of the Year (2013)
  - Ranked No. 8 of the top 500 singles wrestlers in the PWI 500 in 2014
- Pro Wrestling Noah
  - GHC Tag Team Championship (1 time) – with Samoa Joe
- Ring Ka King
  - RKK World Heavyweight Championship (1 time)
  - World Cup of Ring Ka King (2012) – with Scott Steiner, Abyss, Deadly Danda, and Sonjay Dutt
- Stand Alone Wrestling
  - SAW Heavyweight Championship (1 time)
- Total Nonstop Action Wrestling
  - TNA World Heavyweight Championship (1 time)
  - TNA World Tag Team Championship (2 times) – with Doug Williams (1) and Samoa Joe (1)
  - Feast or Fired (2015 – World Tag Team Championship contract)^{1}
  - Global Impact Tournament (2015) – with Team International (The Great Sanada, Drew Galloway, The Great Muta, Tigre Uno, Bram, Rockstar Spud, Khoya, Sonjay Dutt and Angelina Love)
  - TNA World Tag Team Championship No. 1 Contenders Tournament (2010) – with Desmond Wolfe
  - TNA World Heavyweight Championship Tournament (2013)
  - Wild Card Tournament (2011) – with Samoa Joe
  - Xplosion Championship Challenge (2011)
