= Shanky =

Indian professional wrestler (born 1991)

Personal information
- Born: Gurvinder Singh Malhotra; 19 June 1991 (age 35) Jagadhri, Haryana, India
- Education: Maharaja Agrasen College

Professional wrestling career
- Ring name(s): Dilsher Shanky; Shanky; Shanky Singh
- Billed height: 7 ft 0 in (213 cm)
- Billed weight: 140.8 kg (310 lb)
- Billed from: Jalandhar, India
- Trained by: The Great Khali; WWE Performance Center
- Debut: 2015

Gurvinder Singh Malhotra (born 19 June 1991) is an Indian professional wrestler. He is best known for his tenure in WWE, where he performed under the ring name Shanky. He is also known for his tenure in Continental Wrestling Entertainment (CWE).

== Early life ==
Gurvinder was born to Sikh parents Sardar Narendra Singh and Narendra Kaur in 1991 in Jagadhri, Haryana, India. He saw The Great Khali talking about his new academy, Continental Wrestling Entertainment and decided to join CWE in 2015.

== Professional wrestling career ==
At the age of 24, Malhotra joined Continental Wrestling Entertainment (CWE) in 2015. He was officially announced as a CWE Superstar and named as Shanky Singh on 21 June 2016 through the official YouTube channel of CWE. On 22 March 2017, he announced that he had been selected for the WWE tryouts in Dubai, United Arab Emirates. During his time in CWE, he won the Heavyweight title twice.

On 29 January 2020, WWE announced the signings of three Indian trainees, including Malhotra. At Superstar Spectacle on 22 January 2021, Malhotra, under the ring name Dilsher Shanky, teamed with Giant Zanjeer, Rey Mysterio, and Ricochet to defeat Cesaro, Dolph Ziggler, King Corbin, and Shinsuke Nakamura in an eight-man tag-team match. On 10 May episode of Raw, Shanky, along with Veer, would align themselves with Jinder Mahal. As part of the 2021 Draft, both Shanky and Mahal were drafted to the SmackDown brand while Veer remained on the Raw brand, ending their alliance with Veer.

Beginning on the 27 May episode of SmackDown, Shanky began dancing before and after his matches. After Triple H took over creative in June, Shanky disappeared from WWE programming. At the 2023 Superstar Spectacle live event, Shanky returned to the ring for the first time in over 14 months, where he unsuccessfully challenged Gunther for the WWE Intercontinental Championship. On 21 September 2023, Shanky was released from his WWE contract.

== Championship and accomplishments ==
- Continental Wrestling Entertainment
  - CWE Heavyweight Championship (2 times)

== Other media ==
Malhotra played the role of Zalzala Singh in the 2019 movie Bharat. He also made his video game debut as a playable character in WWE 2K23.

== Filmography ==
=== Film ===
Year	Title	Role
2019	Bharat	Zalzala Singh
