= Siddharth Kannan =

Indian television host

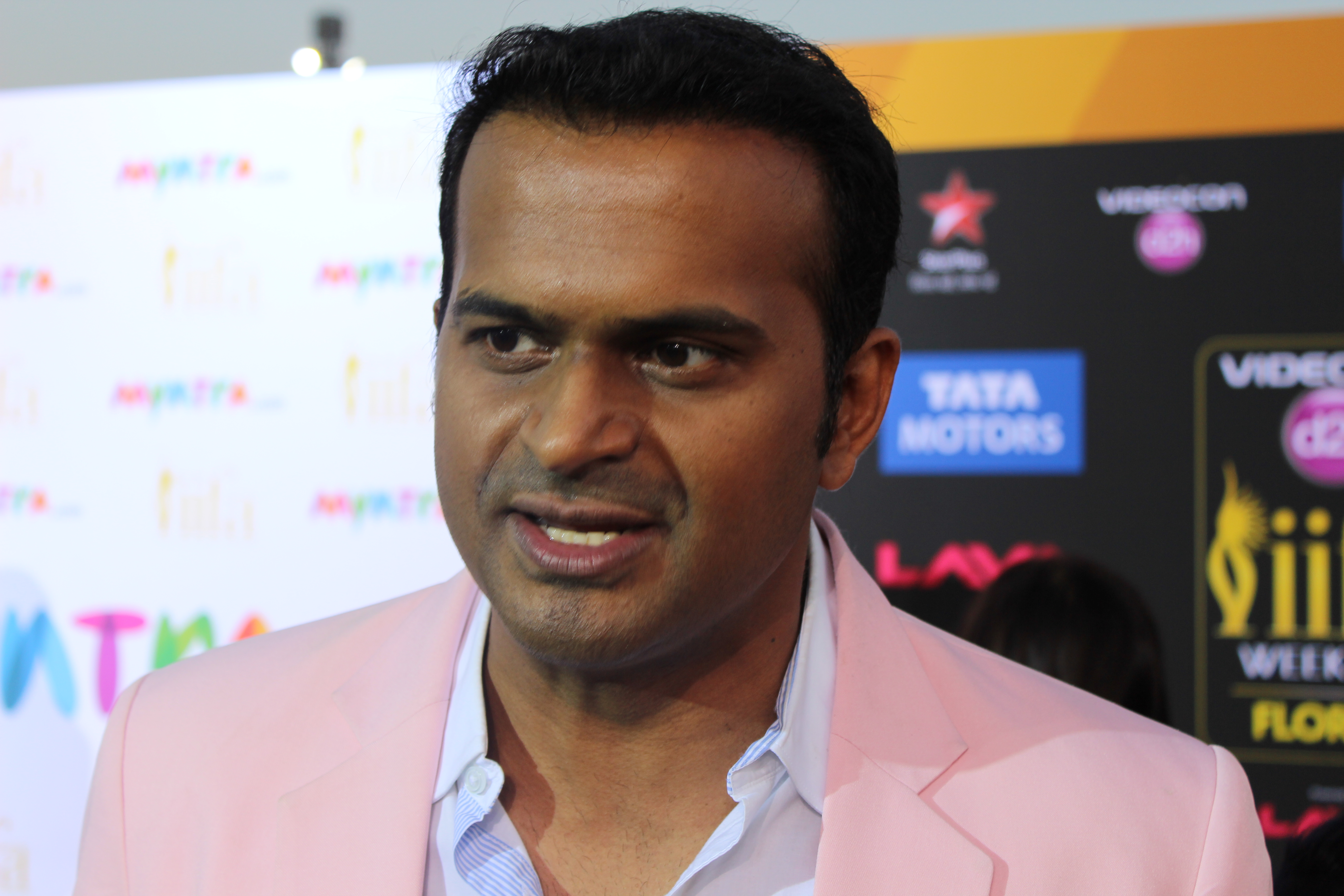
- Kannan at IIFA (2014)
- Born: New Delhi, India
- Occupations: TV and radio host, announcer, voice-over actor, film critic
- Years active: 1994–present
- Height: 186 cm (6 ft 1 in)
- Spouse: Neha Kannan (2 Feb 2014)
- Website: www.siddharthkannan.com

Siddharth Kannan is an Indian television and radio host, announcer, voice-over actor and a film critic.

== Early life and background ==
He was born into a Tamil speaking family in New Delhi to parents V.Kannan and Radha Kannan, Sid K as he is popularly known as, moved to Kolkata with them and then spent 8 years in Lucknow and finally moved base with his family to Mumbai in 1994.

== Career ==
=== Radio ===
At the age of 14, Siddharth joined Times FM as a Radio Host. He holds the record for becoming the youngest radio host in India. In 1997, while at college, he joined Radio Star on 107.1 FM and hosted a show with Cyrus Broacha called ‘Miranda Char Baje Band Baje’. He started India’s first radio school called ‘Wild on Air’ in 1999. Emirates 2 FM in Dubai syndicated their Hindi shows to him, for whom he hosted and produced shows from Mumbai. He also produced and hosted shows for Rediff Radio on rediff.com. In 2009,He started an A list Bollywood celebrity chat show ‘Meow Starburst’ on Meow 104.8fm. Later called as ‘Oye talkies’ and then re-christened as ‘Bollywood Khul Ke ‘ on Oye 104.8FM(a TV Today Network initiative). Sid K has interviewed Amitabh Bachchan, Shahrukh Khan, Salman Khan, Himesh Reshammiya, Aamir Khan, Ranbir Kapoor, Mahaakshay Chakraborty, Deepika Padukone, and Katrina Kaif.

=== Television ===
He hosted his first TV show in 2006 –’Santa and Banta Newz Unlimited’ with renowned singer and rapper Baba Sehgal on Zoom. In 2010,Sid started his next TV show ‘See Taare Mastiii Mein’ –An ‘A list’ celebrity chat show on Mastiii. In 2012,he was the commentator on ‘Ring Ka King’ on Colors produced by Endomol India and backed by Total NonStop Action Wrestling (TNA). In 2014,he was one of the hosts of Star Sports Pro Kabaddi and in the same year he was the host of the inaugural season of the Champions Tennis League on Sony Six.

On 10 May 2017, Siddharth Kannan was the official red carpet host of the Justin Bieber concert at DY Patil Stadium, Mumbai.

== Voice Overs ==
He has been the voice over artist for the IIFA AWARDS (2000–2014), Filmfare Awards and Stardust Awards.

Year	Shows
2000–2004	IIFA AWARDS
2008	Ford Super Model India
2011	Femina Miss India South
2012	IIFA Weekend Singapore amongst others.
2013	Femina Miss India Delhi
2014	IIFA World Premiere (Tampa Bay)
2014	IIFA Stomp (Tampa Bay,Usa)
2014	Provogue Men’s Xp Mr.India World
2014	Filmfare Awards
2014	Avengers-Age of Ultron (official Hindi trailer)
2014	Spectre (official Hindi trailer-James Bond film)
2015	Gima Awards
2016	Renault Star Guild Awards

== Personal life ==
Sid K’s parents are retired Corporate executives. His elder brother Hrishikesh Kannan, also known as Hrishi K,is a radio host and voice over artist in India. Siddharth married Neha in 2014 in Chennai and Mumbai.

== TV shows ==
Year	Shows
2006	Santa and Banta Newz Unlimited on Zoom
2008	Planet Bollywood on Zoom
2010	See Taare Mastiii Mein on Mastiii
2012	Ring Ka King on Colors
2014	Star Sports Pro Kabaddi on Star Sports
2014	Champions Tennis league on Sony Six
2015	Fit And Famous on Tata Sky Active Fitness
2016	Star Special on Mtunes
2017	Super Fight League on Sony ESPN

== Radio shows ==
Year	Shows
1994	Campus Capers on Times FM
1995	Thursday Night Take off on Times FM
1996	Yamaha First on Times FM
1997	Purab Paschim Masala on Radio Star
1998	Miranda Chaar Baje Band Baje on “All India Radio”
1999	East West Masala on All India Radio
2009	Meow Starburst on Meow 104.8fm
2011–2013	Oye Talkies on Oye104.8fm
2013 – present	Bollywood Khul Ke on Oye104.8fm
2016 – present	Ishq Khul Ke on Ishq 104.8FM
2017 – present	Bollywood Hat Ke on London's Lyca Radio

== Achievements ==
Year	Award	Event
2007	Best TV Host	14th Lions Golds Award
2011	Best Radio Host	Newsmakers Achievers Awards
2013	Best Chat Show host on TV	Tassel Fashion and Lifestyle Awards
2013	Best Emcee	Live Quotient Awards (Event Faqs)
2014	Best Emcee	Tassel Fashion and Lifestyle Awards
