= Saurav Gurjar =

Indian professional wrestler and actor

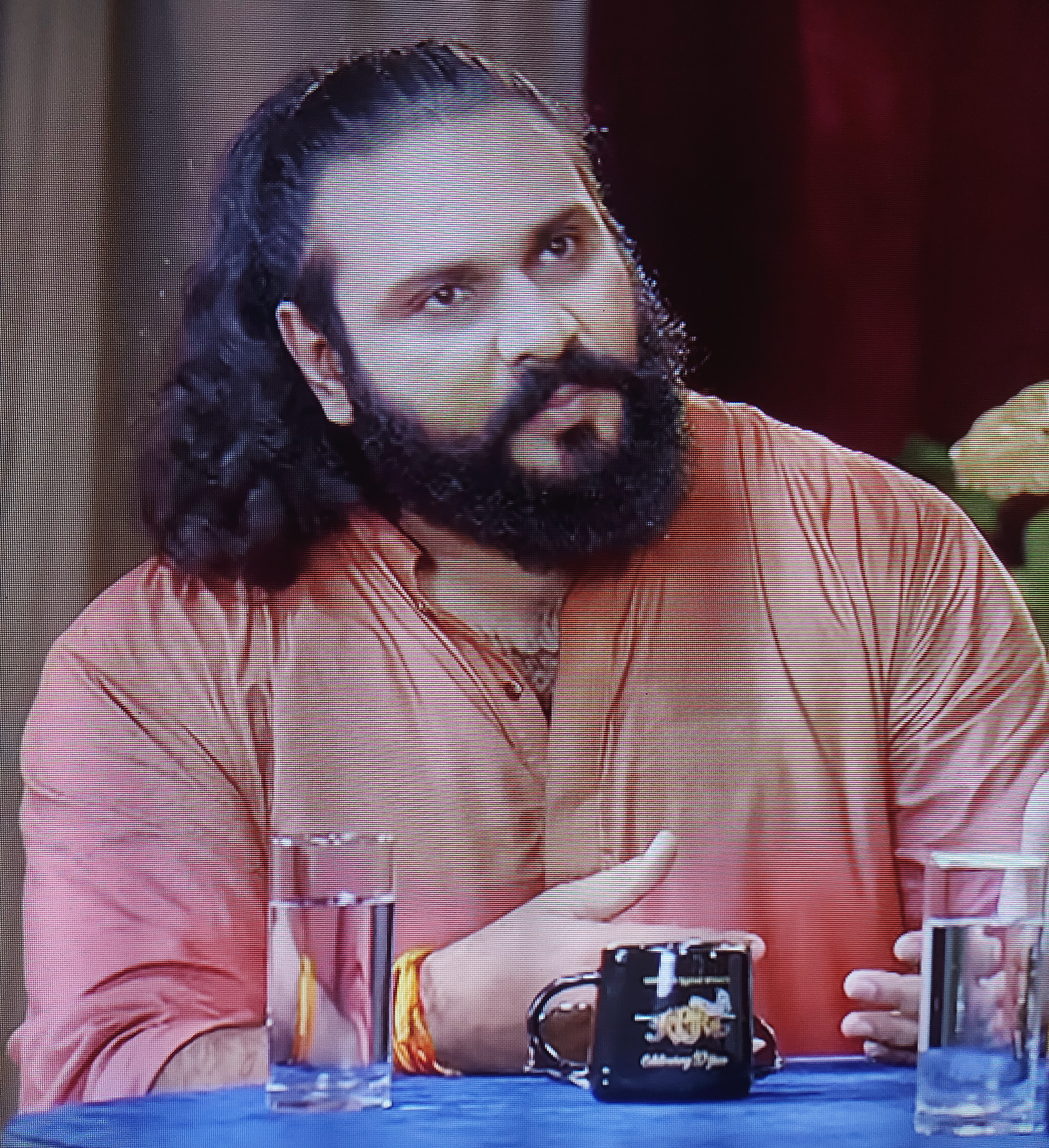
- Gurjar in 2025

Personal information
- Born: 26 September 1985 (age 40) Dabra, Madhya Pradesh, India

Professional wrestling career
- Ring name(s): Deadly Danda; Sanga; Saurav; Saurav Gurjar
- Billed height: 203 cm (6 ft 8 in)
- Billed weight: 136 kg (300 lb)
- Billed from: Madhya Pradesh, India
- Debut: 2011

Saurav Gurjar (born 26 September 1985) is an Indian professional wrestler and actor. As a wrestler, he is best known for his tenure in WWE, where he performed under the ring name Sanga. As an actor, he is best known for his role as Bhima in the TV show Mahabharat (2013). He is a former National Kickboxing Gold Medalist.

== Early life ==
Gurjar was born on 26 September 1985 and hails from Dabra in Madhya Pradesh. He is a former National Kickboxing Gold medalist.

== Professional wrestling career ==
=== Ring Ka King (2011–2012) ===
In December 2011, he took part in Total Nonstop Action Wrestling's India project, Ring Ka King, where he performed under the ring name Deadly Danda. He was a member of Jeff Jarrett's heel stable RDX alongside Abyss, Scott Steiner, Nick Aldis and Sonjay Dutt.

=== WWE (2018–2024) ===
On 14 January 2018, Gurjar signed a contract with WWE. Gurjar made his first televised appearance as a participant in the Worlds Collide men's battle. On 25 March 2020 episode of NXT, Gurjar and Rinku Singh attacked Matt Riddle, with Malcolm Bivens seemingly acting as their manager. The following week, Bivens would introduce them as Rinku and Saurav and revealed their team name to be Indus Sher. Indus Sher stopped appearing on television in June after Gurjar posted a photo on Instagram of Keith Lee holding both the NXT Championship and the NXT North American Championship which he won and retained respectively, at NXT's The Great American Bash (2020) which had yet to air at the time the photo was uploaded.

On 18 January 2022 episode of NXT, Saurav, under the new ring name Sanga, was repackaged as a bodyguard of Grayson Waller. However, on 12 April edition of NXT, Waller fired Sanga and the following week, Sanga would lose to Waller in a singles match. In October, Sanga reformed Indus Sher with Veer Mahaan, the former Rinku, who had recently returned to NXT.

Sanga got promoted to the main roster as he and Indus Sher were drafted to the Raw brand in the 2023 WWE Draft. Sanga made his Raw debut on 15 May in a tag team match with Veer defeating local talents Drake Thompson and Lavar Barbie. On 18 March 2024, episode of Raw, he and Veer were defeated by the Awesome Truth in a qualifier for the Undisputed WWE Tag Team Championship ladder match at WrestleMania XL. On 5 April 2024 episode of Smackdown, he appeared in the André the Giant Memorial Battle Royal, where he was eliminated by the Creed Brothers; this would be his final match. In April 2024, Sanga was released from WWE.

== Championships and accomplishments ==
- Ring Ka King
  - World Cup of Ring Ka King (2012) – with Scott Steiner, Sir Brutus Magnus, Abyss, and Sonjay Dutt

== Acting career ==
In 2013, Gurjar who started his acting venture and appeared on television. He made his television debut with a serial Mahabharat in which he portrayed the role of Bhim. The show was aired on Star Plus and had run from 2013 to 2014. He then appeared in Sankatmochan Mahabali Hanuman as Ravan and Bali from 2016 to 2017.

He made his debut in films with Brahmastra released in 2022. In February 2025, he made a comeback after a 3-year hiatus, with Colors TV's Shiv Shakti - Tap Tyaag Tandav as Swarth.

== Personal life ==
On 21 September 2026, Gurjar was arrested from Chhatrapati Shivaji Maharaj International Airport in Mumbai on the charges of sexual exploitation and sent to 14 days judicial custody in Hyderabad.

== Filmography ==
Key
| † | Denotes films that have not yet been released |

| Year | Film | Role | Notes |
|---|---|---|---|
| 2022 | Brahmāstra Part One: Shiva | Zor | Debut |

=== Television ===
| Year | Show | Role | Notes |
|---|---|---|---|
| 2009 | Entertainment Ke Liye Kuch Bhi Karega | Gongman | |
| 2013–2014 | Mahabharat | Bhim | |
| 2014–2016 | The New Eat Bulaga! Indonesia | Host | |
| 2016–2017 | Sankatmochan Mahabali Hanuman | Ravan and Bali | |
| 2018 | Prithvi Vallabh | Gohil Raj | |
| 2020 | Myopia | Gustad | |
| 2022 | Yeh Jhuki Jhuki Si Nazar | Vivek | |
| 2025 | Shiv Shakti – Tap Tyaag Tandav | Swarth | |
