= Rinku Singh (baseball) =

Indian professional wrestler and actor (born 1984)

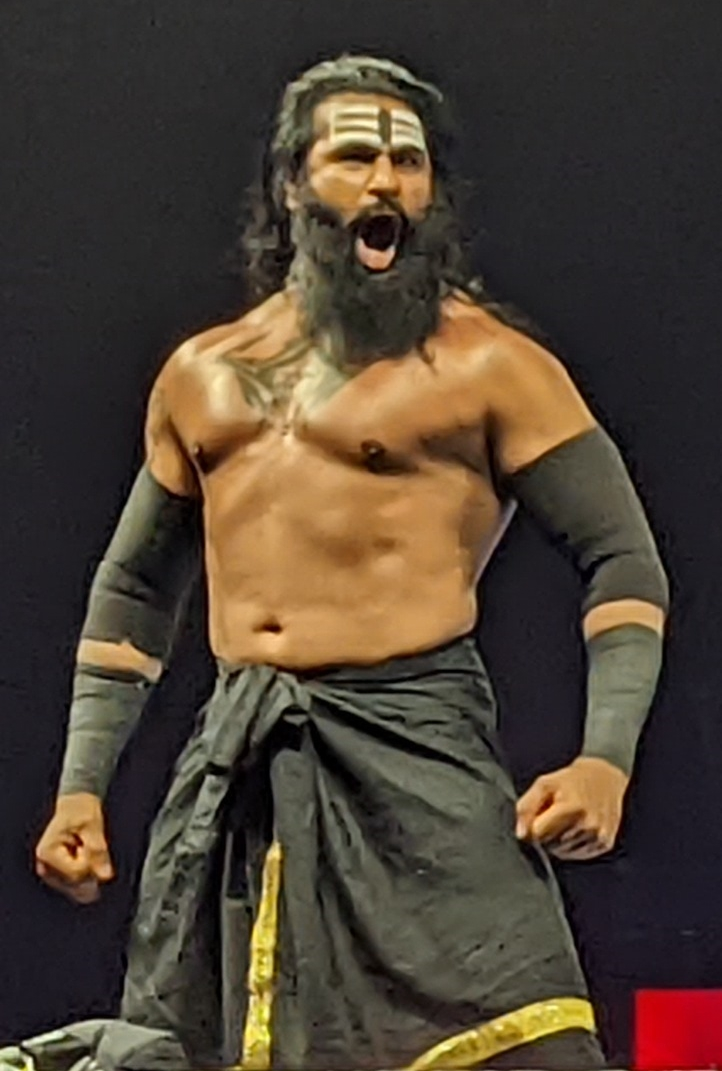
- Rajput in 2022

Personal information
- Born: Rinku Singh Rajput; 8 August 1988 (age 38) Gopiganj, Uttar Pradesh, India

Professional wrestling career
- Ring name(s): Rinku; Rinku Singh; Veer; Veer Mahaan
- Billed height: 6 ft 4 in (193 cm)
- Billed weight: 275 lb (125 kg)
- Billed from: Uttar Pradesh, India
- Trained by: WWE Performance Center
- Debut: 31 May 2018

Rinku Singh Rajput (born 8 August 1988) is an Indian former professional wrestler and former professional baseball player. As a professional wrestler, he is best known for his tenure in WWE, where he performed under the ring names Rinku (shortened from his complete name) and Veer Mahaan (or simply Veer).

Singh was signed by the Pittsburgh Pirates organisation after winning a pitching contest on a 2008 reality television show The Million Dollar Arm. He was the first Indian to play professional baseball and spent several seasons in the minor leagues, reaching the Single-A level. He is the subject of the movie Million Dollar Arm.

After retiring from baseball, Singh signed a contract with WWE in January 2018 and spent time on NXT as a tag team with Saurav Gurjar called "Indus Sher", and spent time on the main roster, particularly on the Raw brand aligning with Jinder Mahal at one point (as Indus Sher and as an unnamed tag team with Shanky), as well as being a singles wrestler. He was released from the company in April 2024.

== Early life ==
Rinku Singh Rajput was born on 8 August 1988 in Gopiganj, Uttar Pradesh, India, in a Rajput Kshatriya family. The son of a truck driver, Singh grew up in poverty in Gopiganj, Bhadohi. Singh was one of nine siblings who all lived in the family's one-room house. The home had electricity but relied on well water. Singh threw the javelin and played cricket as a little boy. He was a junior national javelin medalist. Singh is an alumnus of the Guru Gobind Singh Sports College, Lucknow.

In early 2008, Singh entered an Indian reality television show The Million Dollar Arm. The contest was created by an American sports agent J. B. Bernstein and his partners Ash Vasudevan and Will Chang to find the individual in the country who could throw the fastest and most accurate baseball. Having never heard of baseball before, Singh won the contest out of over 37,000 participants after throwing 87 miles per hour. The grand prize for the contest was $100,000.

After winning the contest, Singh and runner-up Dinesh Patel travelled to Los Angeles where they trained with University of Southern California pitching coach Tom House, who trained pitchers such as Nolan Ryan and Randy Johnson. Singh said that most of his family did not agree with his decision to go to the United States. On their first day in the United States the two attended their first baseball game at USC. They continued to learn the game from House and Bernstein, as well as learning English.

== Professional baseball career ==
Rinku Singh
- Pitcher
- Bats: Left Throws: Left

MILB statistics
- Win–loss record: 10–6
- ERA: 2.97
- Strikeouts: 126
- Stats at Baseball Reference

Teams
- Gulf Coast League Pirates (2009, 2010, 2011, 2016); State College Spikes (2010, 2011); Canberra Cavalry (2010–2011); West Virginia Power (2011, 2012); Adelaide Bite (2011–2012, 2012–2013); Dominican Summer League Pirates (2011)

Singh, along with Patel, tried out in front of scouts from 20 Major League Baseball teams in November 2008, and Singh's pitches reached 92 miles per hour (148 km/h). Reports from Pittsburgh Pirates scouts Joe Ferrone and Sean Campbell led to general manager Neal Huntington signing both to contracts with the organisation. With the deal, the pair became the first Indians to sign American major league baseball contracts. The total signing bonus for the two was $8,000. After training, the two returned to visit their families in India before entering Pirates training camp in Bradenton, Florida. Singh and Patel began the 2009 baseball season with the Pirates' Gulf Coast League affiliate.

On 4 July 2009, Singh became the first Indian citizen to appear in a professional baseball game in the US. He pitched the seventh inning, while Dinesh Patel pitched the eighth inning. On 13 July 2009, Singh won his first professional baseball game in America, striking out the only batter he faced. He finished the season with a 1–2 record and a 5.84 ERA in 11 games, allowing just one run on three hits in his final six appearances.

Singh went 2–0 with a 2.61 ERA over 13 games with the Pirates GCL affiliate in 2010. At the end of August, Singh was promoted to the Pirates Class A Short-Season affiliate, the State College Spikes. He met with US President Barack Obama at a White House Heritage Month event on 24 May 2010. Singh played for the Canberra Cavalry of the Australian Baseball League for the competition's inaugural 2010–11 season, going 1–0 with a 3.94 ERA in 16 innings pitched.

Singh opened the 2011 season in the Dominican Summer League. Singh pitched well in eight games spread over the DSL, Gulf Coast League, and New York–Penn League, then joined the West Virginia Power of the South Atlantic League in July 2011. Singh returned to the Australian Baseball League for the 2011–12 season with the Adelaide Bite. He made the World All-Star team for the 2011 Australian Baseball League All-Star Game. In 2012, he pitched in a career-high 39 games for the Power, throwing 72 innings, earning a 3–1 win–loss record and striking out 65 batters. Singh struggled with injuries and missed the entire 2013 season, but he was invited to 2014 spring training by the Pirates. Singh also missed the entire 2014 season due to Tommy John surgery. Singh also missed all of the 2015 season due to a broken elbow.

The Pirates re-signed Singh on 9 November 2015. He made one appearance for the rookie–level Gulf Coast League Pirates in 2016, pitching one scoreless inning. He elected free agency following the season on 7 November 2016.

== Professional wrestling career ==
On 14 January 2018, Singh signed a contract with American professional wrestling promotion WWE. On 25 March 2020 episode of NXT, Singh, Saurav Gurjar, and manager Malcolm Bivens made their televised debut, attacking NXT Tag Team Champion Matt Riddle. The following week, Bivens introduced them as Rinku and Saurav, while revealing their team name to be Indus Sher (meaning Indian Tigers). On 8 April episode of NXT, Indus Sher defeated Ever-Rise in their debut match. Indus Sher vanished from television after June. At Superstar Spectacle on 22 January 2021, Rinku and Saurav resurfaced and teamed with Drew McIntyre in a six-man tag-team match to defeat Jinder Mahal and The Bollywood Boyz.

On 10 May episode of Raw, Singh, with the new ring name Veer, along with Shanky, would align themselves with Jinder Mahal. During the 2021 Draft, Mahal and Shanky were drafted to the SmackDown brand while Veer remained on the Raw brand, ending their alliance. Now a singles wrestler, Veer's ring name was tweaked to Veer Mahaan. After months of vignettes hyping his debut, Mahaan finally returned to television on 4 April 2022 episode of Raw, attacking Rey and Dominik Mysterio. Mahaan would go on to defeat the Mysterios in separate matches. On the 4 October episode of NXT, Mahaan returned to the developmental brand, teasing a reunion with his former tag team partner Saurav, now known as Sanga. Mahaan returned to the main roster as he and Indus Sher were drafted to the Raw brand in the 2023 WWE Draft. On 18 March 2024 episode of Raw, he and Sanga were defeated by Awesome Truth for a spot in the six-pack ladder match for the Undisputed WWE Tag Team Championship at WrestleMania XL. On the 5 April 2024 episode of Smackdown, he appeared in the André the Giant Memorial Battle Royal, where he was eliminated by the Creed Brothers. On 20 April 2024, Mahaan announced that he had been released by WWE, along with the rest of Indus Sher.

== Film ==
Singh and Patel's story is the basis for the Walt Disney Pictures sports film Million Dollar Arm, in which Singh was portrayed by Suraj Sharma. In 2009, Columbia Pictures purchased the screen rights to the story of Singh and Patel. The project stalled and eventually producers Joe Roth and Mark Ciardi set the film up at Walt Disney Pictures. Upon acquiring Million Dollar Arm, Disney hired Tom McCarthy to write the film. Jon Hamm played J. B. Bernstein.

== Personal life ==
In 2012, Singh became a vegetarian after he witnessed several men in Bhadohi chasing a chicken in order to kill it. During his baseball career, he said that he recited the Hindu devotional hymn Hanuman Chalisa and listened to the Eminem song "Not Afraid" before pitching.

Following his WWE release, Singh became a sannyasi, a renunciate Hindu monk.
