= 2024 United States Senate election in Missouri =

- November 5, 2024
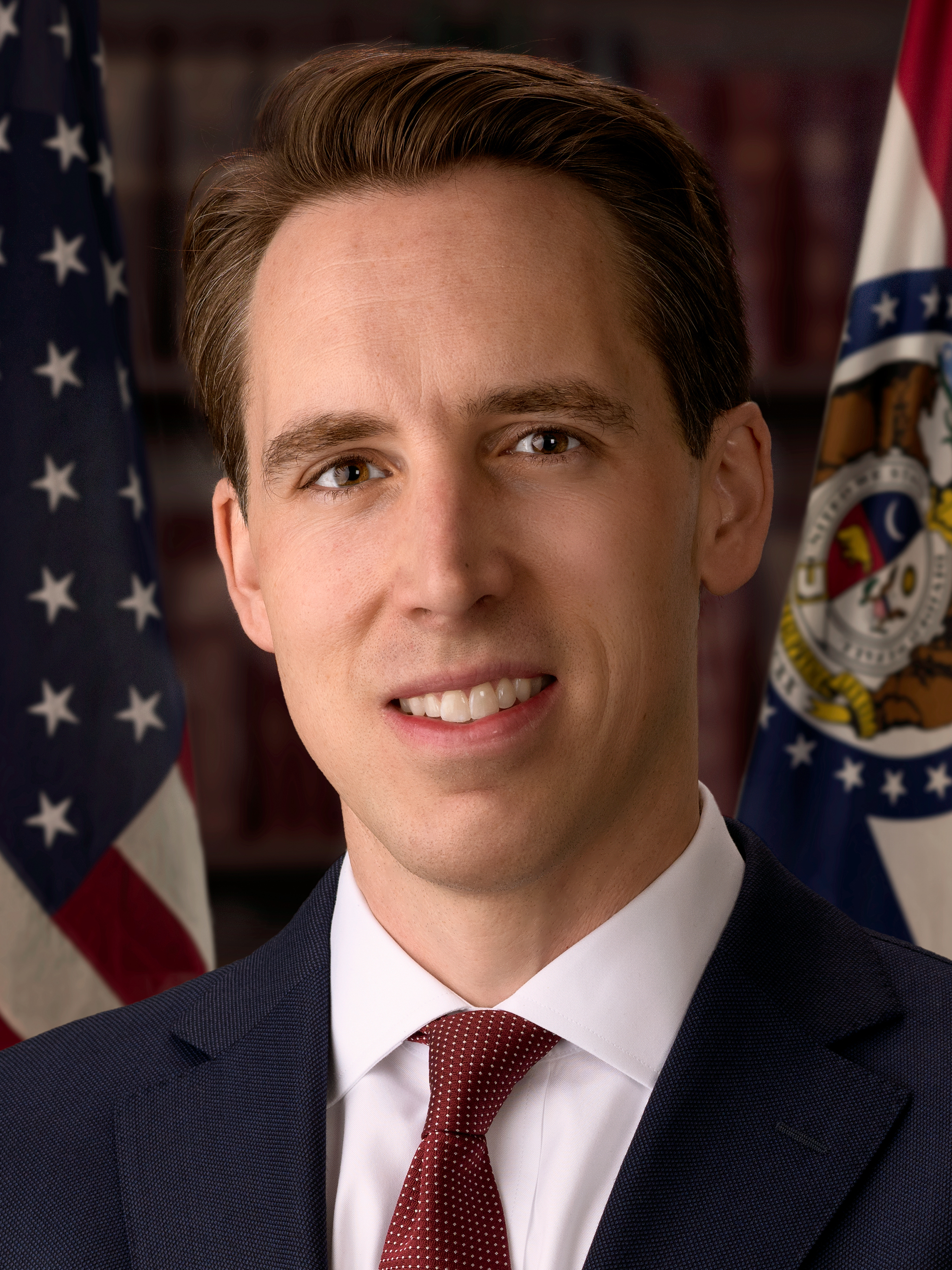

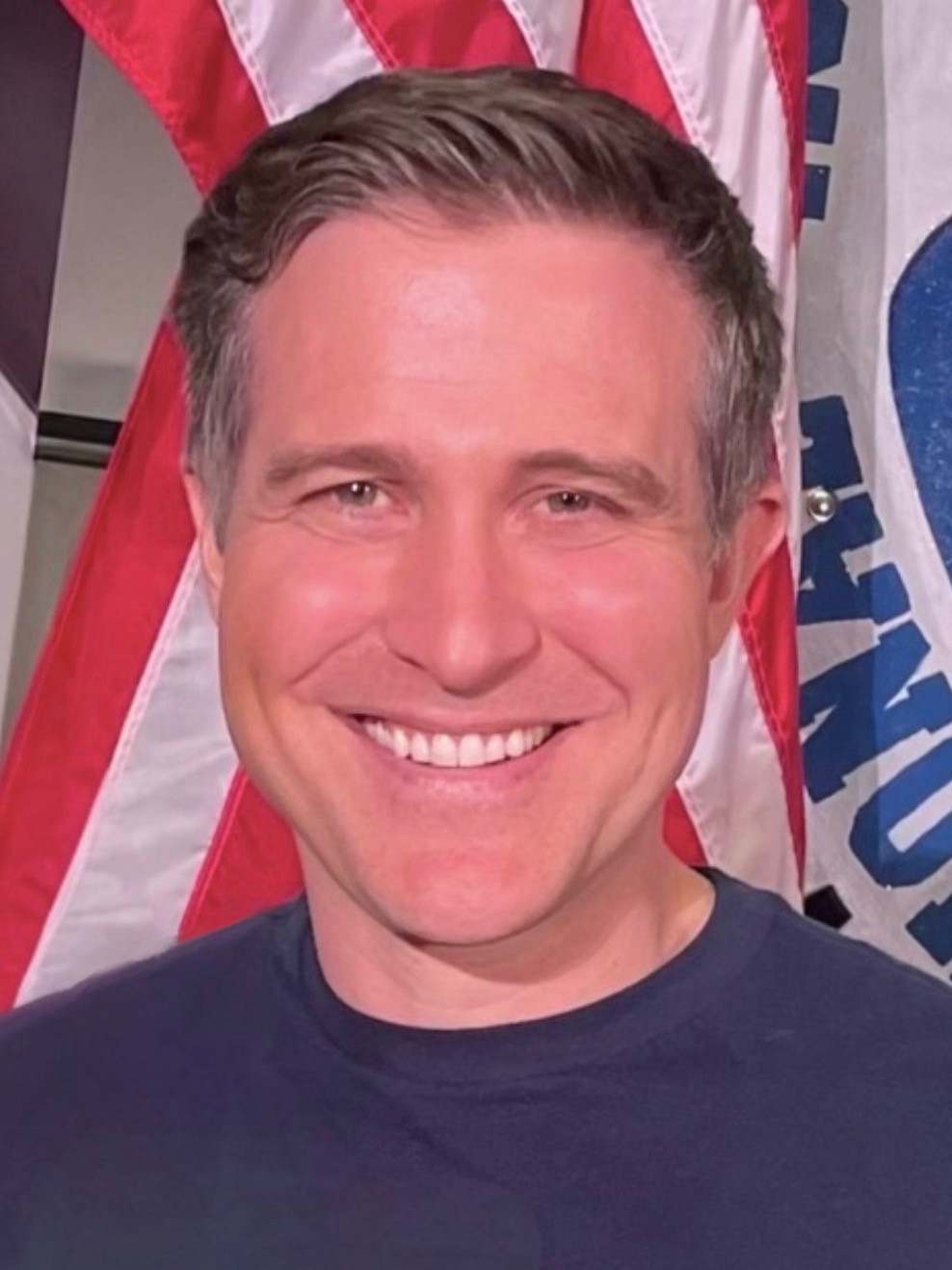
Nominee	Josh Hawley	Lucas Kunce
Party	Republican	Democratic
Popular vote	1,651,907	1,243,728
Percentage	55.57%	41.84%
- Hawley: 40–50% 50–60% 60–70% 70–80% 80–90% >90% Kunce: 40–50% 50–60% 60–70% 70–80% 80–90% >90% Tie: 40–50% 50% No votes
U.S. senator before election
Josh Hawley
Republican
Elected U.S. senator
Josh Hawley
Republican

The 2024 United States Senate election in Missouri was held on November 5, 2024, to elect a member of the United States Senate to represent the state of Missouri. Republican incumbent Josh Hawley was re-elected to a second term, defeating Democratic nominee Lucas Kunce. Primary elections took place on August 6, 2024.

Hawley was the favorite in the polls throughout the cycle due to the state's Republican lean, though some polls showed a close race. Kunce, who had previously run in 2022, losing narrowly in the Democratic primaries to Trudy Busch Valentine, was seen as a strong candidate who outpaced Hawley in fundraising for much of the race and outspent him in advertising.

Hawley ultimately won re-election with a comfortable 55.6% of the vote to Kunce's 41.8%, improving his 2018 margin by around 8 points. Nonetheless, the race was roughly 5 points closer than the concurrent presidential election.

== Background ==
From 1904 to 2004, Missouri's electoral votes always went to the winner of the presidential race, with only one exception: in 1956, during the landslide re-election of President Dwight Eisenhower, Missouri went to Illinois Governor Adlai Stevenson. The state's accuracy in voting with the national consensus includes the highly competitive elections of 1960, 1976, and 2000.

Missouri is no longer thought of as a perennial swing state, and is today considered to be a strongly red state. Since 1960, the only three Democrats it has backed have been Southerners: Lyndon B. Johnson, Jimmy Carter, and Bill Clinton. In 2008, Missouri narrowly voted for the losing candidate, Republican John McCain, despite a sizable electoral college win for Democrat Barack Obama. In 2012, Missouri favored losing candidate Mitt Romney by nearly 10 percentage points, despite another significant victory for Obama in the rest of the country. In 2016 and 2020, Missouri again voted strongly Republican, this time for Donald Trump by over 15 points, despite Trump losing the latter election. This marked the third time in four presidential elections that Missouri supported a losing Republican. Missouri has not supported any Democratic candidate since Bill Clinton in 1996.

In more recent years, Republicans have experienced significant electoral success in the state. In 2016, the Republican Party secured victories in key statewide positions, including Governor, Attorney General, Secretary of State, and Treasurer. Building on this momentum, in 2022, Scott Fitzpatrick successfully won the position of Auditor, a seat previously held by Democrat Nicole Galloway. Notably, Nicole Galloway remains the last Democrat to have been elected to a statewide position in the state.

The most recent Democrat to secure election to the Senate from Missouri was Claire McCaskill back in 2012. She sought a third term in 2018, facing off against Josh Hawley, but was ultimately defeated by a margin of 5.8%.

Most pollsters categorized this race as safe for the Republican Party.

== Republican primary ==
=== Candidates ===
==== Nominee ====
- Josh Hawley, incumbent U.S. senator

=== Endorsements ===
Josh Hawley

Organizations

- AIPAC
- Senate Conservatives Fund

=== Fundraising ===
Campaign finance reports as of July 31, 2024
Candidate	Raised	Spent	Cash on hand
Josh Hawley (R)	$22,492,767	$17,267,201	$5,701,081
Source: Federal Election Commission

=== Results ===
Republican primary results
Party	Candidate	Votes	%
Republican	Josh Hawley (incumbent)	607,602	100.0%
Total votes		607,602	100.0%

== Democratic primary ==
=== Candidates ===
==== Nominee ====
- Lucas Kunce, nonprofit executive and candidate for U.S. Senate in 2022

==== Eliminated in primary ====
- Mita Biswas
- December Harmon, member of the Columbia Police Review Board
- Karla May, state senator (2019–present)

==== Withdrawn ====
- Wesley Bell, St. Louis County prosecuting attorney (ran for U.S. House)

=== Endorsements ===
Lucas Kunce

U.S. representatives

- Bill Clay, former MO-1 (1969–2001)
- Emanuel Cleaver, MO-5 (2005–present)

State officials

- Jason Kander, former secretary of state of Missouri (2013–2017)
- Joe Maxwell, former lieutenant governor of Missouri (2000–2005)
- Susan Montee, former state auditor of Missouri (2007–2011)

State senators

- Jacob Hummel, 4th district (2017–2019)

State representatives

- LaDonna Appelbaum, 71st district (2019–present)
- Ingrid Burnett, 19th district (2017–present)
- Steve Butz, 81st district (2019–present)
- Kimberly-Ann Collins, 77th district (2021–present)
- Chantelle Nickson-Clark, 67th district (2023–present)
- Adrian Plank, 47th district (2023–present)

Municipal officials

- 4 St. Louis County councilors
- Frank White Jr., Jackson County executive (2016–present)

Local officials

- Rasheen Aldridge Jr., St. Louis alder from the 14th ward (2023–present) and former state representative from the 78th district (2019–2023)
- Megan Green, president of the St. Louis Board of Aldermen (2022–present)
- ~~Ella Jones, mayor of Ferguson (2020–present)~~ (switched endorsement to Bell)

Individuals

- Jon Bauman, singer and actor
- Andy Cohen, talk show host
- Harry Dunn, former U.S. Capitol Police officer
- Jon Hamm, actor
- Howie Klein, McGill University professor
- Aaron Parnas, lawyer and TikToker
- Heather Digby Parton, political blogger

Labor unions

- American Federation of Government Employees
- IBEW Local 124
- International Association of Fire Fighters Missouri (Note: Missouri State Council of Fire Fighters and IAFF 2nd district and Local 2665)
- 3 International Association of Heat and Frost Insulators and Allied Workers locals (Note: Locals 1, 27, and 63)
- International Association of Machinists and Aerospace Workers District 9
- International Brotherhood of Boilermakers Local 83
- International Union of Bricklayers and Allied Craftworkers Missouri (Note: Bricklayers Administrative District Council of Missouri and Locals 1 and 15)
- International Union of Elevator Constructors Local 12
- International Union of Operating Engineers Local 101
- International Union of Painters and Allied Trades District Council 3
- Iron Workers Local 10
- Kansas City and St. Louis Building and Construction Trades Councils
- 4 Laborers' Union locals (Note: Locals 264, 663, and 1290)
- Missouri AFL-CIO
- Missouri State Council of Machinists
- Operative Plasterers' and Cement Masons' International Association Local 518
- SEIU Missouri/Kansas State Council
- SMART Local 2
- 5 Sprinkler Fitters locals (Note: Locals 8, 268, 314, 533, and 669)
- Teamsters Locals 41 and 541
- Tile, Marble, and Terrazzo Workers Local 18
- UFCW Local 655
- United Union of Roofers, Waterproofers and Allied Workers Locals 2 and 20

Organizations

- End Citizens United
- Freedom, Inc.
- Indivisible St. Louis
- J Street PAC
- League of Conservation Voters
- VoteVets.org
Karla May

State representatives

- LaKeySha Frazier-Bosley, 79th district (2019–present)

Local officials

- Michael Butler, St. Louis Recorder of Deeds (2018–present), former Missouri Democratic Party chair (2020–2023), and former state representative from the 79th district (2013–2019)
Wesley Bell (withdrawn)

State officials

- Bob Holden, former governor of Missouri (2001–2005)

State representatives

- Deb Lavender, 98th district (2015–2021, 2023–present)

Municipal officials

- Jean Peters Baker, Jackson County prosecutor (2011–present), former Missouri Democratic Party chair (2018–2020), and former state representative from the 39th district (2011)

Local officials

- Ella Jones, mayor of Ferguson (2020–present) (previously endorsed Kunce)
- Sharon Pace, mayor of Northwoods (2021–present) and former state representative from the 74th district (2009–2017)

=== Fundraising ===
Campaign finance reports as of July 31, 2024
Candidate	Raised	Spent	Cash on hand
December Harmon (D)	$16,524 (Note: $6,102 of this total was self-funded by Harmon)	$15,578	$945
Lucas Kunce (D)	$11,193,778	$6,959,981	$4,241,078
Karla May (D)	$53,962	$48,314	$5,647
Source: Federal Election Commission

=== Polling ===
Poll source	Date(s) administered	Sample size (Note: Key: A – all adults RV – registered voters LV – likely voters V – unclear)	Margin of error	Wesley Bell	Mita Biswas	December Harmon	Lucas Kunce	Karla May	Undecided
Remington Research Group (R) (Note: Poll sponsored by the Missouri Scout)	July 10–11, 2024	600 (LV)	± 3.8%	–	1%	4%	39%	10%	46%
Remington Research Group	July 12–13, 2023	661 (LV)	± 3.9%	24%	–	–	31%	10%	35%

=== Results ===
Results by county: Kunce: 40–50%; 50–60%; 60–70%; 70–80%; May: 40–50%

Democratic primary results
Party	Candidate	Votes	%
Democratic	Lucas Kunce	255,775	67.64%
Democratic	Karla May	87,908	23.25%
Democratic	December Harmon	26,804	7.09%
Democratic	Mita Biswas	7,647	2.02%
Total votes		378,134	100.0%

== Libertarian primary ==
=== Declared ===
- W. C. Young

=== Results ===
Libertarian primary results
Party	Candidate	Votes	%
Libertarian	W.C. Young	2,437	100.0%
Total votes		2,437	100.0%

== Other candidates ==
=== Declared ===
- Nathan Kline (Green), executive assistant
- Jared Young (Better Party), payroll services executive

=== Fundraising ===
Campaign finance reports as of March 31, 2024
Candidate	Raised	Spent	Cash on hand
Jared Young (BP)	$364,377 (Note: $245,000 of this total was self-funded by Young)	$253,727	$110,650
Source: Federal Election Commission

== General election ==
The two candidates participated in two debates—one alongside third-party opponents and a second one-on-one televised event. Both debates were marked by frequent attacks. Hawley criticized Kunce over an accidental shooting involving a reporter at a campaign event and his refusal to endorse a presidential candidate. Kunce countered by attacking Hawley's involvement in objecting to the certification of the 2020 election and his opposition to abortion rights. 2024 Missouri Amendment 3, which was concurrently on the ballot, passed and legalized abortion in Missouri.

Despite the contentious exchanges, the candidates found some common ground on border security and opposition to deploying U.S. troops to the Middle East.

=== Predictions ===
Source	Ranking	As of
The Cook Political Report	Solid R	November 9, 2023
Inside Elections	Solid R	November 9, 2023
Sabato's Crystal Ball	Safe R	November 9, 2023
Decision Desk HQ/The Hill	Likely R	August 26, 2024
Elections Daily	Safe R	May 4, 2023
CNalysis	Solid R	November 21, 2023
RealClearPolitics	Likely R	August 5, 2024
Split Ticket	Safe R	October 23, 2024
538	Solid R	October 26, 2024

=== Post-primary endorsements ===
Josh Hawley (R)

Individuals

- Harrison Butker, NFL kicker

Organizations

- Missouri Farm Bureau PAC
Lucas Kunce (D)

U.S. representatives

- Adam Kinzinger, former IL-16 (2011–2023) (Republican)

Organizations

- Planned Parenthood Action Fund

Newspapers

- The Kansas City Star
- St. Louis Post-Dispatch

Organizations

- National Farmers Union

Individuals

- Andy Cohen, actor
- John Goodman, actor
Jared Young (B)

U.S. senators

- John Danforth, former Missouri (1976–1995) (Republican)

=== Polling ===
Aggregate polls

Source of poll aggregation	Dates administered	Dates updated	Josh Hawley (R)	Lucas Kunce (D)	Undecided (Note: Calculated by taking the difference of 100% and all other candidates combined.)	Margin
FiveThirtyEight	through November 3, 2024	November 4, 2024	51.3%	41.8%	6.9%	Hawley +9.5%
TheHill/DDHQ	through November 3, 2024	November 4, 2024	52.6%	44.5%	2.9%	Hawley +8.1%
Average			52.0%	43.2%	4.8%	Hawley +8.8%

Poll source	Date(s) administered	Sample size	Margin of error	Josh Hawley (R)	Lucas Kunce (D)	Other	Undecided
Research Co.	November 2–3, 2024	450 (LV)	± 4.6%	52%	41%	3% (Note: "Some other candidate" with 3%)	4%
ActiVote	October 6–27, 2024	400 (LV)	± 4.9%	56%	44%	–	–
GQR (D) (Note: Poll sponsored by IAFF Local 2665)	October 23–26, 2024	600 (LV)	± 4.0%	49%	46%	–	5%
Emerson College (Note: Poll sponsored by The Hill and Nexstar)	October 22–23, 2024	620 (LV)	± 3.9%	51%	41%	2% (Note: Young (L) with 1%; Kline (G) with 1%)	7%
ActiVote	September 1 – October 1, 2024	400 (LV)	± 4.9%	54%	46%	–	–
Emerson College (Note: Poll sponsored by The Hill)	September 12–13, 2024	850 (LV)	± 3.3%	51%	40%	1%	8%
Change Research	September 11–13, 2024	1,237 (RV)	± 3.1%	46%	41%	4%	9%
GQR Research (D) (Note: Poll sponsored by Kunce's campaign)	September 6–12, 2024	645 (LV)	± 3.9%	50%	46%	2%	2%
GQR Research (D)	September 6–12, 2024	645 (LV)	± 3.9%	52%	48%	–	–
Remington Research Group (R)	September 4–5, 2024	816 (LV)	–	52%	37%	–	11%
YouGov/Saint Louis University	August 8–16, 2024	900 (LV)	± 3.8%	53%	42%	–	4%
Emerson College	June 17–19, 2024	1,000 (RV)	± 3.0%	47%	38%	5%	10%
Remington Research Group (R)	March 6–8, 2024	713 (LV)	± 3.9%	53%	39%	–	8%
Emerson College	January 23–28, 2024	1,830 (RV)	± 2.2%	43%	30%	7%	20%
Show Me Victories (D)	October 26–31, 2023	407 (RV)	± 4.9%	46%	42%	4%	8%
Emerson College	October 1–4, 2023	491 (RV)	± 4.4%	45%	32%	5%	17%
GQR Research (D)	August 16–19, 2023	863 (LV)	± 3.3%	44%	43%	–	12%

Hypothetical polling

Josh Hawley vs. Wesley Bell

Poll source	Date(s) administered	Sample size	Margin of error	Josh Hawley (R)	Wesley Bell (D)	Other	Undecided
Emerson College	October 1–4, 2023	491 (RV)	± 4.4%	44%	34%	5%	17%

=== Debate ===
2024 United States Senate election in Missouri debate
No.	Date	Host	Moderator	Link	Republican	Democratic	Libertarian	Green	Better
Key: P Participant A Absent N Not invited I Invited W Withdrawn									
Key: P Participant A Absent N Not invited I Invited W Withdrawn					Hawley	Kunce	Young	Kline	Young
1	Sep. 20, 2024	Missouri Press Association	David Lieb	YouTube	P	P	N	P	P

=== Results ===
2024 United States Senate election in Missouri
Party	Candidate	Votes	%	±%
Republican	Josh Hawley (incumbent)	1,651,907	55.57%	▲4.19
Democratic	Lucas Kunce	1,243,728	41.84%	▼3.73
Libertarian	W.C. Young	35,671	1.20%	▲0.08
Better Party	Jared Young	21,111	0.71%	N/A
Green	Nathan Kline	20,123	0.68%	▲0.16
Write-in		19	0.00%	Steady
Total votes		2,972,559	100.00%	N/A
Republican hold				

==== By county ====
County	Josh Hawley Republican		Lucas Kunce Democratic		Various candidates Other parties		Margin		Total
County	#	%	#	%	#	%	#	%	Total
Adair	6,589	64.76%	3,307	32.50%	279	2.74%	3,282	32.26%	10,175
Andrew	7,002	72.04%	2,490	25.62%	228	2.35%	4,512	46.42%	9,720
Atchison	2,052	78.23%	479	18.26%	92	3.51%	1,573	59.97%	2,623
Audrain	7,172	69.11%	2,893	27.88%	312	3.01%	4,279	41.24%	10,377
Barry	12,423	77.72%	3,169	19.83%	392	2.45%	9,254	57.90%	15,984
Barton	4,958	83.81%	836	14.13%	122	2.06%	4,122	69.68%	5,916
Bates	6,100	74.15%	1,924	23.39%	203	2.47%	4,176	50.76%	8,227
Benton	7,966	74.52%	2,468	23.09%	256	2.39%	5,498	51.43%	10,690
Bollinger	5,244	85.94%	750	12.29%	108	1.77%	4,494	73.65%	6,102
Boone	37,557	42.05%	49,327	55.22%	2,439	2.73%	-11,770	-13.18%	89,323
Buchanan	21,451	60.61%	13,017	36.78%	922	2.61%	8,434	23.83%	35,390
Butler	14,267	80.60%	3,107	17.55%	326	1.84%	11,160	63.05%	17,700
Caldwell	3,506	75.09%	1,036	22.19%	127	2.72%	2,470	52.90%	4,669
Callaway	14,110	66.38%	6,598	31.04%	550	2.59%	7,512	35.34%	21,258
Camden	18,505	73.19%	6,294	24.89%	484	1.91%	12,211	48.30%	25,283
Cape Girardeau	28,864	72.26%	10,089	25.26%	992	2.48%	18,775	47.00%	39,945
Carroll	3,395	76.09%	955	21.40%	112	2.51%	2,440	54.68%	4,462
Carter	2,403	85.06%	379	13.42%	43	1.52%	2,024	71.65%	2,825
Cass	36,053	61.31%	21,081	35.85%	1,674	2.85%	14,972	25.46%	58,808
Cedar	5,649	79.59%	1,260	17.75%	189	2.66%	4,389	61.83%	7,098
Chariton	2,887	71.55%	1,052	26.07%	96	2.38%	1,835	45.48%	4,035
Christian	37,040	73.28%	12,465	24.66%	1,040	2.06%	24,575	48.62%	50,545
Clark	2,539	77.62%	617	18.86%	115	3.52%	1,922	58.76%	3,271
Clay	63,337	49.02%	62,452	48.33%	3,421	2.65%	885	0.68%	129,210
Clinton	7,614	68.55%	3,217	28.96%	276	2.48%	4,397	39.59%	11,107
Cole	25,034	62.75%	13,896	34.83%	966	2.42%	11,138	27.92%	39,896
Cooper	6,028	68.60%	2,566	29.20%	193	2.20%	3,462	39.40%	8,787
Crawford	8,220	76.71%	2,305	21.51%	191	1.78%	5,915	55.20%	10,716
Dade	3,284	79.29%	770	18.59%	88	2.12%	2,514	60.70%	4,142
Dallas	6,504	77.72%	1,645	19.66%	219	2.62%	4,859	58.07%	8,368
Daviess	2,934	75.04%	864	22.10%	112	2.86%	2,070	52.94%	3,910
DeKalb	3,610	75.79%	1,026	21.54%	127	2.67%	2,584	54.25%	4,763
Dent	5,662	80.62%	1,181	16.82%	180	2.56%	4,481	63.80%	7,023
Douglas	5,866	81.59%	1,165	16.20%	159	2.21%	4,701	65.38%	7,190
Dunklin	7,786	79.00%	1,794	18.20%	276	2.80%	5,992	60.80%	9,856
Franklin	36,907	67.22%	16,597	30.23%	1,400	2.55%	20,310	36.99%	54,904
Gasconade	5,976	75.45%	1,808	22.83%	136	1.72%	4,168	52.63%	7,920
Gentry	2,450	75.27%	735	22.58%	70	2.15%	1,715	52.69%	3,255
Greene	82,303	57.38%	57,542	40.11%	3,600	2.51%	24,761	17.26%	143,445
Grundy	3,420	78.37%	869	19.91%	75	1.72%	2,551	58.46%	4,364
Harrison	3,105	81.52%	648	17.01%	56	1.47%	2,457	64.51%	3,809
Henry	7,617	70.57%	2,856	26.46%	321	2.97%	4,761	44.11%	10,794
Hickory	3,818	75.38%	1,111	21.93%	136	2.69%	2,707	53.45%	5,065
Holt	1,873	80.84%	401	17.31%	43	1.86%	1,472	63.53%	2,317
Howard	3,262	66.60%	1,513	30.89%	123	2.51%	1,749	35.71%	4,898
Howell	14,932	79.65%	3,414	18.21%	400	2.13%	11,518	61.44%	18,746
Iron	3,289	74.24%	1,014	22.89%	127	2.87%	2,275	51.35%	4,430
Jackson	117,054	37.10%	189,008	59.91%	9,410	2.98%	-71,954	-22.81%	315,472
Jasper	38,129	71.33%	13,518	25.29%	1,810	3.39%	24,611	46.04%	53,457
Jefferson	73,111	62.09%	41,469	35.22%	3,162	2.69%	31,642	26.87%	117,742
Johnson	15,269	65.25%	7,462	31.89%	670	2.86%	7,807	33.36%	23,401
Knox	1,406	80.16%	307	17.50%	41	2.34%	1,099	62.66%	1,754
Laclede	13,600	79.91%	3,073	18.06%	347	2.04%	10,527	61.85%	17,020
Lafayette	11,895	69.27%	4,927	28.69%	349	2.03%	6,968	40.58%	17,171
Lawrence	14,138	77.58%	3,625	19.89%	460	2.52%	10,513	57.69%	18,223
Lewis	3,460	78.23%	833	18.83%	130	2.94%	2,627	59.39%	4,423
Lincoln	22,811	71.99%	8,071	25.47%	804	2.54%	14,740	46.52%	31,686
Linn	4,028	71.67%	1,424	25.34%	168	2.99%	2,604	46.33%	5,620
Livingston	5,077	74.85%	1,598	23.56%	108	1.59%	3,479	51.29%	6,783
Macon	6,111	78.76%	1,529	19.71%	119	1.53%	4,582	59.05%	7,759
Madison	4,465	78.65%	1,068	18.81%	144	2.54%	3,397	59.84%	5,677
Maries	3,822	80.23%	873	18.32%	69	1.45%	2,949	61.90%	4,764
Marion	9,642	74.21%	3,032	23.34%	318	2.45%	6,610	50.88%	12,992
McDonald	7,620	82.43%	1,428	15.45%	196	2.12%	6,192	66.98%	9,244
Mercer	1,475	83.01%	273	15.36%	29	1.63%	1,202	67.64%	1,777
Miller	10,194	79.36%	2,366	18.42%	286	2.23%	7,828	60.94%	12,846
Mississippi	3,263	74.99%	942	21.65%	146	3.36%	2,321	53.34%	4,351
Moniteau	5,469	75.96%	1,572	21.83%	159	2.21%	3,897	54.13%	7,200
Monroe	3,256	75.56%	962	22.33%	91	2.11%	2,294	53.24%	4,309
Montgomery	4,497	75.68%	1,329	22.37%	116	1.95%	3,168	53.32%	5,942
Morgan	7,243	75.39%	2,138	22.25%	227	2.36%	5,105	53.13%	9,608
New Madrid	5,068	75.80%	1,433	21.43%	185	2.77%	3,635	54.37%	6,686
Newton	22,381	77.23%	5,860	20.22%	739	2.55%	16,521	57.01%	28,980
Nodaway	6,562	68.23%	2,849	29.62%	207	2.15%	3,713	38.60%	9,618
Oregon	3,635	80.01%	786	17.30%	122	2.69%	2,849	62.71%	4,543
Osage	6,337	82.31%	1,257	16.33%	105	1.36%	5,080	65.98%	7,699
Ozark	3,802	80.89%	791	16.83%	107	2.28%	3,011	64.06%	4,700
Pemiscot	3,735	73.22%	1,260	24.70%	106	2.08%	2,475	48.52%	5,101
Perry	7,619	79.62%	1,753	18.32%	197	2.06%	5,866	61.30%	9,569
Pettis	13,134	70.18%	5,101	27.26%	480	2.56%	8,033	42.92%	18,715
Phelps	13,014	67.93%	5,662	29.56%	481	2.51%	7,352	38.38%	19,157
Pike	5,754	74.31%	1,856	23.97%	133	1.72%	3,898	50.34%	7,743
Platte	28,061	48.59%	28,351	49.09%	1,343	2.33%	-290	-0.50%	57,755
Polk	12,204	77.38%	3,234	20.51%	333	2.11%	8,970	56.88%	15,771
Pulaski	10,834	70.63%	4,022	26.22%	483	3.15%	6,812	44.41%	15,339
Putnam	1,937	82.53%	341	14.53%	69	2.94%	1,596	68.00%	2,347
Ralls	4,404	77.14%	1,181	20.69%	124	2.17%	3,223	56.45%	5,709
Randolph	7,700	70.55%	2,900	26.57%	315	2.89%	4,800	43.98%	10,915
Ray	7,791	67.50%	3,444	29.84%	307	2.66%	4,347	37.66%	11,542
Reynolds	2,343	78.47%	581	19.46%	62	2.08%	1,762	59.01%	2,986
Ripley	4,739	83.43%	779	13.71%	162	2.85%	3,960	69.72%	5,680
Saline	5,971	64.32%	3,038	32.73%	274	2.95%	2,933	31.60%	9,283
Schuyler	1,513	79.76%	327	17.24%	57	3.00%	1,186	62.52%	1,897
Scotland	1,473	78.77%	347	18.56%	50	2.67%	1,126	60.21%	1,870
Scott	13,488	78.25%	3,409	19.78%	339	1.97%	10,079	58.48%	17,236
Shannon	3,088	78.36%	736	18.68%	117	2.97%	2,352	59.68%	3,941
Shelby	2,535	78.92%	616	19.18%	61	1.90%	1,919	59.74%	3,212
St. Charles	121,368	54.15%	97,175	43.36%	5,573	2.49%	24,193	10.79%	224,116
St. Clair	3,809	76.62%	1,071	21.54%	91	1.83%	2,738	55.08%	4,971
St. Francois	19,573	69.57%	7,899	28.08%	661	2.35%	11,674	41.50%	28,133
St. Louis City	18,068	15.62%	93,919	81.19%	3,685	3.19%	-75,851	-65.57%	115,672
St. Louis County	179,628	35.75%	309,428	61.58%	13,438	2.67%	-129,800	-25.83%	502,494
Ste. Genevieve	6,415	66.87%	2,982	31.09%	196	2.04%	3,433	35.79%	9,593
Stoddard	11,451	85.23%	1,726	12.85%	258	1.92%	9,725	72.39%	13,435
Stone	14,687	77.49%	3,948	20.83%	319	1.68%	10,739	56.66%	18,954
Sullivan	1,957	80.73%	425	17.53%	42	1.73%	1,532	63.20%	2,424
Taney	20,221	76.28%	5,630	21.24%	658	2.48%	14,591	55.04%	26,509
Texas	9,324	81.45%	1,884	16.46%	240	2.10%	7,440	64.99%	11,448
Vernon	6,778	76.67%	1,835	20.76%	228	2.58%	4,943	55.91%	8,841
Warren	13,858	69.72%	5,579	28.07%	439	2.21%	8,279	41.65%	19,876
Washington	7,648	76.04%	2,183	21.70%	227	2.26%	5,465	54.33%	10,058
Wayne	4,783	83.02%	840	14.58%	138	2.40%	3,943	68.44%	5,761
Webster	15,163	76.99%	4,074	20.69%	457	2.32%	11,089	56.31%	19,694
Worth	848	78.52%	210	19.44%	22	2.04%	638	59.07%	1,080
Wright	7,608	85.06%	1,197	13.38%	139	1.55%	6,411	71.68%	8,944
Total	1,651,907	55.57%	1,243,728	41.84%	76,924	2.59%	408,179	13.73%	2,972,559

==== Counties that flipped from Democratic to Republican ====
- Clay (largest city: Kansas City)

==== Counties that flipped from Republican to Democratic ====
- Platte (largest city: Kansas City)

==== By congressional district ====
Hawley won six of eight congressional districts.

District	Hawley	Kunce	Representative
1st	19%	77%	Cori Bush (118th Congress)
1st	19%	77%	Wesley Bell (119th Congress)
2nd	50%	47%	Ann Wagner
3rd	59%	39%	Blaine Luetkemeyer (118th Congress)
3rd	59%	39%	Bob Onder (119th Congress)
4th	67%	31%	Mark Alford
5th	35%	62%	Emanuel Cleaver
6th	65%	32%	Sam Graves
7th	68%	29%	Eric Burlison
8th	73%	24%	Jason Smith

== Notes ==
Partisan clients
