= List of awards and nominations received by Jon Hamm =

Jon Hamm awards and nominations
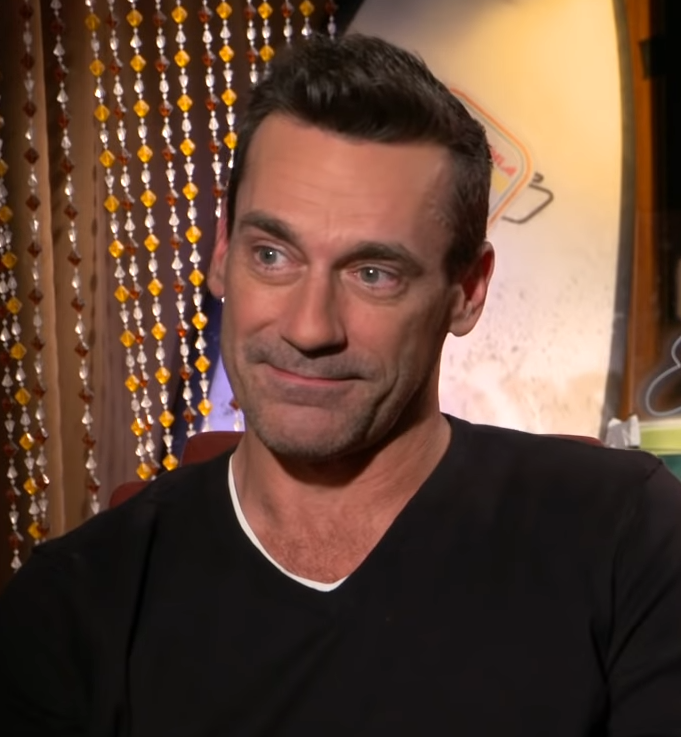
- Hamm in 2018
Awards and nominations
Award	Wins	Nominations
Critics' Choice	1	3
Emmy Awards	1	18
Golden Globes	2	7
SAG Awards	2	14

Totals (Note: Certain award groups do not simply award one winner. They acknowledge several different recipients, have runners-up, and have third place. Since this is a specific recognition and is different from losing an award, runner-up mentions are considered wins in this award tally. For simplification and to avoid errors, each award in this list has been presumed to have had a prior nomination.)
- Wins: 40
- Nominations: 149

Jon Hamm is an American actor known for his roles on film and television. Over his career he has received various accolades including a Primetime Emmy Award, two Golden Globe Awards, a Critics' Choice Award and two Screen Actors Guild Awards.

Hamm is best known for his leading role as 1960s advertising executive Don Draper in the critically acclaimed AMC period drama series Mad Men (2007–2015). He received widespread acclaim as well as eight Primetime Emmy Award for Outstanding Lead Actor in a Drama Series nominations for the role, where he finally won the award in 2015. He also received two Golden Globe Awards for Best Actor – Television Series Drama and a Critics' Choice Television Award for Best Actor in a Drama Series as well as nominations for six Screen Actors Guild Award for Outstanding Actor in a Drama Series, he won twice along with the cast for the Screen Actors Guild Award for Outstanding Ensemble in a Drama Series.

Hamm took on a supporting role as tech billionaire in the Apple TV+ drama series The Morning Show (2023), where he was nominated for the Primetime Emmy Award for Outstanding Supporting Actor in a Drama Series and the Screen Actors Guild Award for Outstanding Ensemble in a Drama Series. He took a leading role as Roy Tillman, a North Dakota sheriff in the fifth season of the FX anthology crime series Fargo (2023–2024) earning nominations for the Primetime Emmy Award for Outstanding Lead Actor in a Limited or Anthology Series or Movie and the Golden Globe Award for Best Actor – Miniseries or Television Film, and the Screen Actors Guild Award for Outstanding Actor in a Miniseries or Television Movie.

Also known for his comedic roles, he took a recurring guest role as Drew Baird, a pediatrician and a love interest for Liz Lemon in the NBC sitcom 30 Rock (2009–2012), for which he received three nominations for the Primetime Emmy Awards for Outstanding Guest Actor in a Comedy Series. He took a supporting role Reverend Richard Wayne Gary Wayne in the Netflix sitcom Unbreakable Kimmy Schmidt (2015–2019), for which he was nominated for the Primetime Emmy Award for Outstanding Guest Actor in a Comedy Series.

On film, Hamm played an FBI agent Adam Frawley in the crime thriller The Town (2010), for which he won the National Board of Review Award for Best Cast and was nominated alongside the cast for the Critics' Choice Movie Award for Best Acting Ensemble. He portrayed J. B. Bernstein in the sports drama Million Dollar Arm (2014) for which he was nominated for the Choice Movie Actor: Drama. He also acted in the dramas Baby Driver (2017), Beirut (2018), Bad Times at the El Royale (2018), The Report (2019), Richard Jewell (2019), and Top Gun: Maverick (2022) as well as the comedy films Bridesmaids (2011), Friends with Kids (2011), Tag (2018), and Confess, Fletch (2022).

== Major associations ==
=== Critics' Choice Awards ===
Year	Category	Nominated work	Result	Ref.
Critics' Choice Movie Award
2010	Best Movie Cast	The Town	Nominated	
Critics' Choice Television Awards
2010	Best Television Drama Series Actor	Mad Men	Won	
2011	Best Television Drama Series Actor	Mad Men	Nominated	

=== Emmy Awards ===
Year	Category	Nominated work	Result	Ref.
Primetime Emmy Awards
2008	Outstanding Lead Actor in a Drama Series	Mad Men (episode: "The Wheel")	Nominated	
2009	Outstanding Lead Actor in a Drama Series	Mad Men (episode: "The Mountain King")	Nominated	
2009	Outstanding Guest Actor in a Comedy Series	30 Rock	Nominated	
2010	Outstanding Guest Actor in a Comedy Series	30 Rock (episode: "Emanuelle Goes to Dinosaur Land")	Nominated	
2010	Outstanding Lead Actor in a Drama Series	Mad Men (episode: "The Gypsy and the Hobo")	Nominated	
2011	Outstanding Lead Actor in a Drama Series	Mad Men (episode: "The Suitcase")	Nominated	
2012	Outstanding Drama Series	Mad Men (season 5)	Nominated	
2012	Outstanding Lead Actor in a Drama Series	Mad Men (episode: "The Other Woman")	Nominated	
2012	Outstanding Guest Actor in a Comedy Series	30 Rock (episode: "Live from Studio 6H")	Nominated	
2013	Outstanding Drama Series	Mad Men (season 6)	Nominated	
2013	Outstanding Lead Actor in a Drama Series	Mad Men (episode: "In Care Of")	Nominated	
2014	Outstanding Drama Series	Mad Men (season 7 - Part 1)	Nominated	
2014	Outstanding Lead Actor in a Drama Series	Mad Men (episode: "The Strategy")	Nominated	
2015	Outstanding Drama Series	Mad Men (season 7 - Part 2)	Nominated	
2015	Outstanding Lead Actor in a Drama Series	Mad Men (episode: "Person to Person")	Won	
2015	Outstanding Guest Actor in a Comedy Series	Unbreakable Kimmy Schmidt (episode: "Kimmy Makes Waffles!")	Nominated	
2024	Outstanding Supporting Actor in a Drama Series	The Morning Show (episode: "The Green Light")	Nominated	
2024	Outstanding Lead Actor in a Limited Series or Movie	Fargo	Nominated	
2026	Outstanding Drama Series	Your Friends & Neighbors	Pending	

=== Golden Globe Awards ===
Year	Category	Nominated work	Result	Ref.
2007	Best Actor in a Television Series – Drama	Mad Men (season 1)	Won	
2008	Best Actor in a Television Series – Drama	Mad Men (season 2)	Nominated	
2009	Best Actor in a Television Series – Drama	Mad Men (season 3)	Nominated	
2010	Best Actor in a Television Series – Drama	Mad Men (season 4)	Nominated	
2012	Best Actor in a Television Series – Drama	Mad Men (season 5)	Nominated	
2015	Best Actor in a Television Series – Drama	Mad Men (season 7)	Won	
2023	Best Actor – Miniseries or Television Film	Fargo (season 5)	Nominated	

=== Screen Actors Guild Awards ===
Year	Category	Nominated work	Result	Ref.
2007	Outstanding Ensemble in a Drama Series	Mad Men (season 1)	Nominated	
2007	Outstanding Male Actor in a Drama Series	Mad Men (season 1)	Nominated	
2008	Outstanding Male Actor in a Drama Series	Mad Men (season 2)	Nominated	
2008	Outstanding Ensemble in a Drama Series	Mad Men (season 2)	Won	
2009	Outstanding Ensemble in a Drama Series	Mad Men (season 3)	Won	
2009	Outstanding Male Actor in a Drama Series	Mad Men (season 3)	Nominated	
2010	Outstanding Male Actor in a Drama Series	Mad Men (season 4)	Nominated	
2010	Outstanding Ensemble in a Drama Series	Mad Men (season 4)	Nominated	
2012	Outstanding Ensemble in a Drama Series	Mad Men (season 5)	Nominated	
2012	Outstanding Male Actor in a Drama Series	Mad Men (season 5)	Nominated	
2015	Outstanding Male Actor in a Drama Series	Mad Men (season 7)	Nominated	
2015	Outstanding Ensemble in a Drama Series	Mad Men (season 7)	Nominated	
2023	Outstanding Ensemble in a Drama Series	The Morning Show (season 3)	Nominated	
2023	Outstanding Male Actor in a Miniseries or Television Movie	Fargo (season 5)	Nominated	

== Miscellaneous awards ==
Organizations	Year	Category	Work	Result	Ref.
Annie Awards	2016	Outstanding Voice Acting in a Feature Film	Minions	Nominated	
MTV Movie & TV Awards	2012	Best Movie On-Screen Dirtbag of the Year	Bridesmaids	Nominated	
National Board of Review Awards	2010	Best Cast	The Town	Won	
Satellite Awards	2007	Best Cast in Television	Mad Men	Won	
Satellite Awards	2008	Best Actor in a Drama Television Series	Mad Men	Nominated	
Satellite Awards	2009	Best Actor in a Drama Television Series	Mad Men	Nominated	
Satellite Awards	2010	Best Actor in a Drama Television Series	Mad Men	Nominated	
Satellite Awards	2012	Best Actor in a Drama Television Series	Mad Men	Nominated	
Teen Choice Awards	2014	Choice Drama Movie Actor of the Year	Million Dollar Arm	Nominated	
Teen Choice Awards	2018	Choice Movie: Fight	Tag	Nominated	
Television Critics Association Awards	2008	Outstanding Individual Achievement in Drama	Mad Men	Nominated	
Television Critics Association Awards	2009	Outstanding Individual Achievement in Drama	Mad Men	Nominated	
Television Critics Association Awards	2011	Outstanding Individual Achievement in Drama	Mad Men	Won	
Television Critics Association Awards	2012	Outstanding Individual Achievement in Drama	Mad Men	Nominated	
Television Critics Association Awards	2015	Outstanding Individual Achievement in Drama	Mad Men	Won	
