= Million Dollar Arm (disambiguation) =

Million Dollar Arm is a 2014 American biographical sports drama film.

Million Dollar Arm may also refer to:

- Million Dollar Arm (soundtrack), the soundtrack album of the film
- Million Dollar Arm (TV series), a 2008 Indian reality TV show
