= Poore Bahuriya =

Village in Uttar Pradesh, India

Poore Bahuriya or PooreBahuria is a village in Bhadohi district in the Indian state of Uttar Pradesh under Gopiganj police station. Purebahuriya is located in Gyanpur Taluk. The population of the village was recorded as 1239 in the 2015 census.

Literacy ratio in Poore Bahuriya village in 2011 was 56.82%, lower than the figure of 67.69% for the state of Uttar Pradesh. In males the literacy rate was 69.69% however female literacy rate was 44.59%.

The number of employed person of Poore Bahuriya village is 63 while 89 are un-employed. And out of 63 working people 15 persons are fully dependent on farming.

There is a primary school but there are no school bus services in the villages so the children have to walk to their schools.

The village is famous for its full glory during marriage and festive season. Poore Bahuriya is a village of Rajputs (Bisen).
