= Tom House =

American baseball player and coach (born 1947)

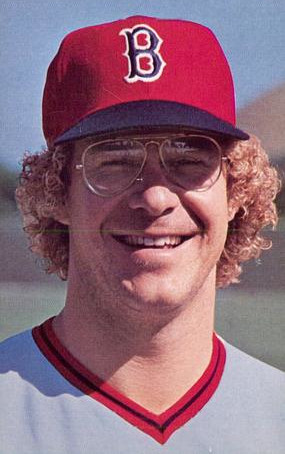
- Pitcher
- Born: April 29, 1947 (age 79); Seattle, Washington, U.S.
- Batted: Left Threw: Left

MLB debut
- June 23, 1971, for the Atlanta Braves

Last MLB appearance
- September 29, 1978, for the Seattle Mariners

MLB statistics
- Win–loss record: 29–23
- Earned run average: 3.79
- Strikeouts: 261
- Stats at Baseball Reference

Teams
- Atlanta Braves (1971–1975); Boston Red Sox (1976–1977); Seattle Mariners (1977–1978)

Thomas Ross House (born April 29, 1947) is an American former left-handed relief pitcher in Major League Baseball, as well as an author and a pitching coach.

== Baseball career ==
=== Player ===
House pitched at Nogales High School (La Puente, California) and the University of Southern California, before the Atlanta Braves selected him with the 48th overall pick of the 1967 draft's secondary phase, as part of the draft's third round. He had passed up an earlier chance to turn pro two years before, when the Chicago Cubs used the 201st overall pick to take him in the 11th round of the June draft's main phase.

Advancing quickly through the Braves' system, House made his major league debut on June 23, 1971, pitching one inning in relief of Pat Jarvis in the seventh inning of a 6–3 loss to the Montreal Expos. Relying mainly on a curveball and a screwball, House was an important part of the Braves' bullpen in the mid-1970s. His best season was 1974, when he pitched 102 2/3 innings, all in relief, with a 1.93 earned run average (ERA) and a 0.98 walks plus hits per inning pitched (WHIP) ratio. His 38 games finished ranked seventh in the National League, and his 11 saves were good for fifth. House also ranked among the league leaders in those categories in 1975, when his 45 games finished ranked third, and his 11 saves placed tenth.

House was traded from the Braves to the Boston Red Sox for Roger Moret on December 12, 1975. At the time, the Red Sox had a surplus of starting pitchers and needed more bullpen depth. After he spent 1976 in Boston, the Red Sox sold his contract to the Seattle Mariners, an expansion team, early in the 1977 season. House concluded his major league career after two seasons with the Mariners in 1977 and 1978. He retired with 29 wins, 23 losses, 34 saves, and a 3.79 ERA in 536 major league innings.

=== Coach ===
After his retirement as a player, House became a pitching coach. In addition to Bachelor of Science in marketing and Master of Business Administration degrees from USC, House holds a Ph.D. in sports psychology from U.S. International University (now Alliant International University). Early in his career, he employed what were thought of as unusual methods at the time, but have since been adopted by the baseball community at large such as having pitchers under his tutelage throw a football.

House became the pitching coach for the Texas Rangers in 1985, during which time he was notable for his work with Nolan Ryan. During Ryan's induction into the Baseball Hall of Fame on July 25, 1999, he credited House as a positive influence on his career, saying:

While I was [with the Rangers] I was very fortunate to have a pitching coach by the name of Tom House. And Tom and I are of the same age and Tom is a coach that is always on the cutting edge. And I really enjoyed our association together and he would always come up with new training techniques that we would try and see how they would work in to my routine. And because of our friendship and Tom pushing me, I think I got in the best shape of my life during the years that I was with the Rangers.

House has also worked as a coach for the Houston Astros, San Diego Padres, Chunichi Dragons, and Chiba Lotte Marines. He is an advisor with the American Sports Medicine Institute, and is the co-founder of the National Pitching Association. Through the NPA, he runs a series of camps and clinics for athletes, and markets a series of instructional videos for young baseball players. House has also written or co-written nineteen instructional books on baseball, as well as an autobiography.

In 1998, the American Baseball Coaches Association presented House with a lifetime achievement award.

House served as pitching coach for the USC Trojans from 2008-2011, when he retired from coaching.

In 2008, House worked as a consultant and pitching coach for the reality program The Million Dollar Arm. In this capacity, he trained two young Indian prospects, Rinku Singh and Dinesh Patel over a period of seven months. At the end of that time he had raised the velocity of both prospects' fastballs to major league levels, and the two signed professional baseball contracts with the Pittsburgh Pirates' organization. The story of The Million Dollar Arm is dramatized in the Disney movie of the same name.

Recently, House has worked with several NFL quarterbacks, including, Dak Prescott, Drew Brees, Tom Brady, Alex Smith, Carson Palmer, Cody Kessler, Matt Cassel, Jared Goff, Marcus Mariota, Andrew Luck, Jimmy Garoppolo, Carson Wentz, Terrelle Pryor, Tim Tebow, Andy Dalton, Blake Bortles, Matt Ryan, Mac Jones, and Bo Nix.

== Historical legacy ==
=== Coaching legacy ===
House has been called the "father of modern pitching mechanics," and a "professor of throwing." House was one of the first to blend scientific based pitching study into methodologies for pitchers. He has led elite coaching to become scientific instead of guesswork. He has developed a model that is focused on quantifying the movement in each athlete's motion, then using drills and exercises to maximize accuracy and velocity and minimize strain on player's bodies.

House has been one of the first to adopt "Neurophysiology," by pairing his mechanics and motion analysis with functional fitness to address an athlete's functional strength inefficiencies, sleep and nutrition to recover faster, and data driven mental and emotional assessment to uncover how athletes deal with the stress and anxiety of competition.

=== Steroids ===
House has admitted to using anabolic steroids in the 1970s, making him one of the earliest players to admit to using performance-enhancing drugs. In an interview with the San Francisco Chronicle, he described his use of steroids as "a failed experiment", although he increased from around 190 pounds to around 220 while using them. He viewed the experience as a failure since the extra muscle did not enhance his substandard 82-MPH fastball, while the drugs contributed to knee problems, eventually necessitating a total of seven operations. He claims to have stopped using them after learning in college classes during the off-season about the potential long-term effects of steroid use.

House has stated that "six or seven" pitchers on every major league staff in the 1970s were "fiddling" with steroids or human growth hormone. He attributes players' willingness to experiment with performance-enhancing substances to the permissiveness of the drug culture of the 1960s, and he believed that steroid use declined in Major League Baseball since the 1970s, as players have become more aware of the potential long-term drawbacks.

=== Aaron's home run ===
House and Hank Aaron were both members of the Braves in 1974, the season when Aaron broke Babe Ruth's record for career home runs. Aaron hit the record-setting 715th home run in the fourth inning of a game against the Los Angeles Dodgers, on April 8, 1974, against pitcher Al Downing. The ball landed in the Braves' bullpen in left-center field, where it was caught on the fly by House. Bill Buckner, then the Dodgers' left fielder, climbed to the top of the fence and begged House for the ball. The game stopped to celebrate the achievement, and after sprinting to the infield, House presented the ball to Aaron at home plate. His only payment was a TV given by a local store.

=== In popular culture ===
House was portrayed by Bill Paxton in the Disney film Million Dollar Arm.

== Partial bibliography ==
- The Winning Pitcher: Baseball's Top Pitchers Demonstrate What it Takes to Be an Ace, NTC Publishing Group, 1988. ISBN 0-8092-4878-6.
- Jock's Itch: The Fast-Track Private World of the Professional Ballplayer, NTC Publishing Group, 1989. ISBN 0-8092-4779-8.
- Diamond Appraised: A World-Class Theorist and a Major League Coach Square off on Timeless Topics in the Game of Baseball, Simon & Schuster, 1989. ISBN 0-671-67769-1. (With Craig R. Wright.)
- Nolan Ryan's Pitcher's Bible: The Ultimate Guide to Power, Precision and Long-Term Performance, Simon & Schuster, 1991. ISBN 0-671-70581-4. (With Nolan Ryan and Jim Rosenthal.)
- Play Ball: The New Baseball Basics for Youth Coaches, Parents, and Kids, West Publishing Company, 1993. ISBN 0-314-02575-8. (With Coop DeRenne, Thomas W. Harris, and Barton Buxton.)
- Power Baseball, West Publishing Company, 1993. ISBN 0-314-01849-2. (With Coop DeRenne and Thomas W. Harris.)
- Pitching Edge, Human Kinetics Publishers, 1994. ISBN 0-87322-503-1.
- Fit to Pitch, Human Kinetics Publishers, 1996. ISBN 0-87322-882-0. (With Randy Johnson.)
- Stronger Arms and Upper Body, Human Kinetics Publishers, 2000. ISBN 0-88011-977-2.
- The Picture Perfect Pitcher, Coaches Choice Books, 2003. ISBN 1-58518-602-3. (With Paul Reddick.)
- The Art and Science of Pitching, Coaches Choice Books, 2006. ISBN 1-58518-960-X. (With Gary Heil and Steve Johnson.)

Preceded by Dick Such	Texas Rangers pitching coach 1985–1992	Succeeded by Claude Osteen
