= Royale Touche =

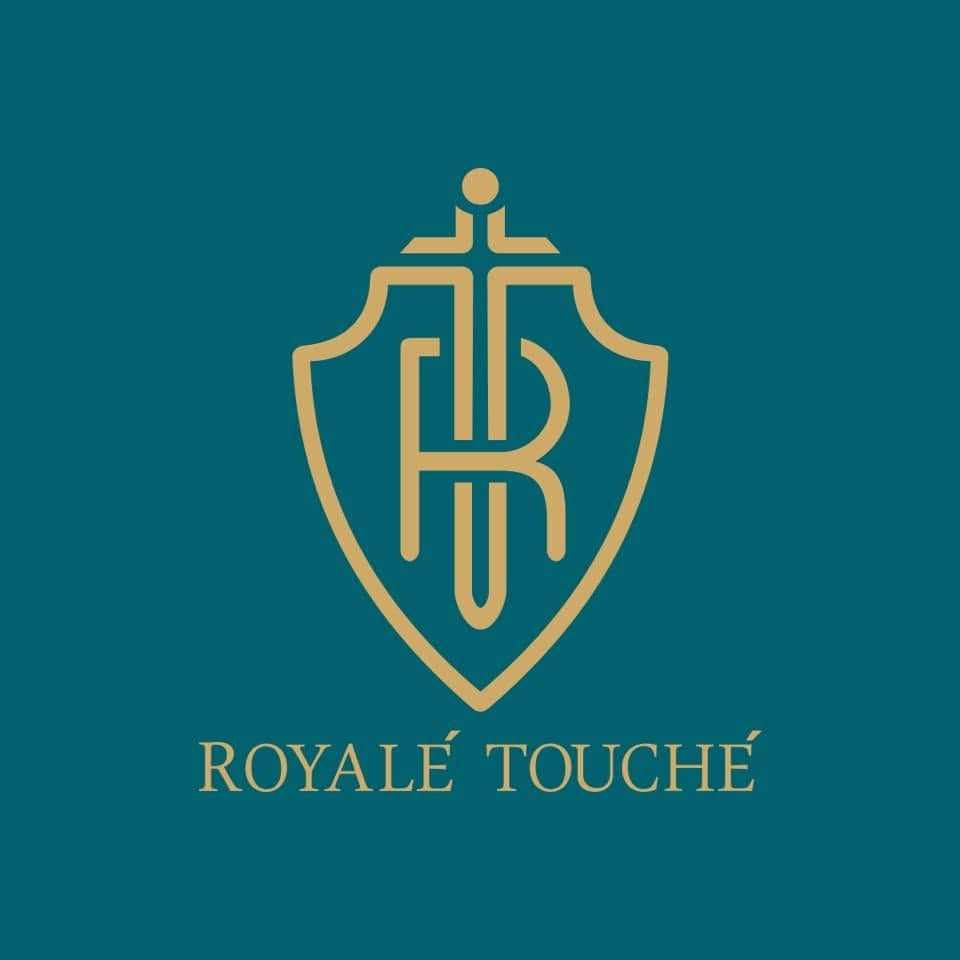
- Type: Limited liability partnership
- Industry: Building materials; Interior design materials
- Founded: 1978
- Founders: Ashwin Patel, Arvind Patel, Dinesh Patel, Jitendra Patel, Bharat Patel
- Headquarters: Ahmedabad, Gujarat, India
- Area served: India; international markets
- Key people: Jitendra Patel (Designated Partner); Arvind Patel (Designated Partner)
- Products: Decorative laminates, compact laminates, plywood, decorative veneers, acrylic sheets, engineered wooden flooring, flush doors, solid acrylic surfaces
- Revenue: ₹334 crore
- Number of employees: 215
- Parent: Olympic Decor LLP
- Website: royaletouche.com

Royale Touche is an Indian building materials brand headquartered in Ahmedabad, Gujarat. Established in 1978, the brand manufactures and distributes building and interior surface materials.

== History ==
Royale Touche was founded in 1978 by Ashwin Patel, Arvind Patel, Dinesh Patel, Bharat Patel, and Jitendra Patel. The company is associated with Olympic Decor LLP and operates in the building materials and interior products sector.

The company began by manufacturing decorative laminates for the Indian furniture and interior design market. Later it expanded its product portfolio to include plywood, decorative veneers, acrylic sheets, engineered wooden flooring, and other interior surface materials.

== Operations ==
Royale Touche is headquartered in Ahmedabad, Gujarat, India. The company serves customers across India and exports to international markets. It operates through a distribution and retail network of more than 250 locations.

The company's products are used in residential, commercial, and institutional interior projects by architects, interior designers, contractors, and carpenters.

Royale Touche also distributes wooden flooring from Classen of Germany, solid acrylic products from Sewon of South Korea, and luxury veneers from Busnelli of Italy.

== Corporate social responsibility ==
In February 2026, Royale Touche contributed approximately ₹55 lakh through CSR initiatives to organisations including Shreemad Rajchandra Seva Kendra, Vijnanabharathi Educational and Charitable Society, CEPT Research and Development Foundation, Trimurti Hospital Trust, Care Institute of Medical Sciences Foundation, Jivraj Mehta Smarak Health Foundation, UMA Arogya Foundation and Parivartan Foundation.

In 2026, Royale Touche was donated ₹20 lakh through CSR initiatives to social welfare and healthcare organisations, including NGOs and charitable trusts supporting community welfare and vulnerable groups.

== See also ==
- Laminate
- Plywood
- Interior design
- Flooring
