= Jon Hamm =

American actor (born 1971)

- Hamm at TIFF in 2026
- Born: Jonathan Daniel Hamm; March 10, 1971 (age 55); St. Louis, Missouri, U.S.
- Education: University of Missouri (BA)
- Occupation: Actor
- Years active: 1996–present
- Works: Full list
- Spouse: Anna Osceola (m. 2023)
- Partner: Jennifer Westfeldt (1997–2015)
- Children: 1
- Awards: Full list

Jonathan Daniel Hamm (born March 10, 1971) is an American actor. He is best known for his role as Don Draper in the period drama series Mad Men (2007–2015), for which he won numerous accolades, including a Primetime Emmy Award and two Golden Globe Awards.

Hamm also acted in lead roles in the films Stolen (2010), Million Dollar Arm (2014), Keeping Up with the Joneses (2016), Beirut (2018), and Confess, Fletch (2022), as well as his supporting roles in The Town (2010), Sucker Punch (2011), Bridesmaids (2011), Baby Driver (2017), Tag (2018), Bad Times at the El Royale (2018), The Report (2019), Lucy in the Sky (2019), Richard Jewell (2019), No Sudden Move (2021), and Top Gun: Maverick (2022). He voiced roles in Shrek Forever After (2010), Minions (2015), Transformers One (2024), and Hoppers (2026).

Hamm expanded his career on television taking leading roles in prestige drama series such as Sky Arts' A Young Doctor's Notebook (2012–2013), FX's Fargo (2023–24), Paramount+'s Landman (2024–25), Apple TV's Your Friends & Neighbors (2025–present), and MGM+’s American Hostage (2026). He has taken supporting roles in the dystopian anthology Black Mirror: White Christmas (2014), the superhero series Legion (2018), the fantasy series Good Omens (2019), and the drama series The Morning Show (2023). He has also taken comedic roles guest starring in 30 Rock (2009–2012), Parks and Recreation (2015), Unbreakable Kimmy Schmidt (2015–2020), and Curb Your Enthusiasm (2020–21).

== Early life and education ==
Jonathan Daniel Hamm was born on March 10, 1971, in St. Louis, Missouri, the son of Deborah (née Garner) Hamm, a secretary, and Daniel Hamm, who managed a family trucking company. Hamm is of German, English, French, and Irish descent. He was raised Catholic. His parents divorced when he was two years old, and he lived in the St. Louis suburb of Creve Coeur with his mother until her death from colon cancer when Hamm was 10 years old. He then lived with his father and grandmother in nearby Normandy until his father died ten years after his mother. Jon was 20.

His first acting role was as Winnie-the-Pooh in first grade. At 16, he was cast as Judas in the play Godspell and enjoyed the experience, though he did not take acting seriously. He attended John Burroughs School, a private school in Ladue, where he was a member of the football, baseball and swim teams. During this time, he dated Sarah Clarke, who became an actress.

While in high school, Hamm was recruited by Ivy League and Division III NCAA football programs but after graduating in 1989, Hamm matriculated to the University of Texas. While a member of Sigma Nu fraternity at that university, Hamm was arrested along with seven other students for violently attacking and severely injuring fellow student Mark Allen Sanders as part of fraternity hazing in November 1990. According to a 1991 lawsuit filed by Sanders and subsequent reports, Hamm was accused of being a ringleader in a brutal, hours-long initiation ritual. The lawsuit alleged that Hamm helped strike the pledge with a paddle, lit Sanders's jeans on fire, and forced him to hold a heavy object while engaging in physical tasks. Hamm admitted the crime and was charged with hazing as part of a deferred adjudication plea deal, which allowed him to complete probation without a formal conviction being entered on his record. Subsequently, the charges of assault were dismissed. The Sigma Nu chapter was disbanded, and Hamm left the University of Texas shortly after the incident, later transferring to the University of Missouri. He answered an advertisement from a theater company seeking players for a production of A Midsummer Night's Dream and was cast in the production. Other roles followed, such as Leon Czolgosz in Assassins.

== Career ==
After graduating in 1993 with a BA in English, Hamm returned to his high school to teach eighth-grade acting. One of his students was Ellie Kemper, who became an actress. Years later, Hamm appeared in Kemper's Netflix series Unbreakable Kimmy Schmidt.

=== 1995–2006: Early roles ===
Hamm, who did not wish to pursue a "normal career", moved to Los Angeles permanently in 1995. He moved into a house with four other aspiring actors and began working as a waiter while attending auditions. He acted in theater, including as Flavius in a production of Shakespeare's Timon of Athens with the Sacred Fools Theater Company. Looking older than his age, he found it difficult to find work as an actor, despite representation by the William Morris Agency. In 1998, after he had failed to get any acting work for three years, William Morris dropped him as a client. He continued working as a waiter and, briefly, worked as a set decorator for a softcore pornography movie. He decided that his thirtieth birthday would be his deadline to succeed in Hollywood, and has said:

You either suck that up and find another agent, or you go home and say you gave it a shot, but that's the end of that. The last thing I wanted to be out here was one of those actors who's 45 years old, with a tenuous grasp of their own reality, and not really working much. So I gave myself five years. I said, if I can't get it going by the time I'm 30, I'm in the wrong place. And as soon as I said that, it's like I started working right away.

In 2000, Hamm landed the role of romantic firefighter Burt Ridley on NBC's drama series Providence. His one-episode contract grew to 19 and allowed him to quit waiting tables. He made his feature movie debut with one line in Clint Eastwood's adventure film Space Cowboys (2000). More substantial roles followed in the independent comedy Kissing Jessica Stein (2001) and the war film We Were Soldiers (2002), during the filming of which he turned 30. His career was bolstered by his recurring role of police inspector Nate Basso on Lifetime's television series The Division from 2002 to 2004. Other minor roles followed on the television series What About Brian, CSI: Miami, Related, Numb3rs, The Unit, and The Sarah Silverman Program. Hamm's Mad Men castmate Eric Ladin said in an interview that he admired Hamm because he was persistent until he became successful as an actor.

=== 2007–2015: Breakthrough with Mad Men ===
Hamm landed his breakthrough role in 2007, when he was chosen from over 80 candidates to play Don Draper, protagonist of AMC's drama series Mad Men. In the series, set in a fictional 1960s Madison Avenue ad agency, he played a suave, married, philandering executive with an obscure past. He recalled, "I read the script for Mad Men and I loved it ... I never thought they'd cast me—I mean, I thought they'd go with one of the five guys who look like me but are movie stars." He believes that an actor with a "proven track record" would likely have been chosen if another network had produced the show. He went through numerous auditions; each time he explained to the casting directors what he could bring to the character, if given the part. Alan Taylor and Mad Men creator Matthew Weiner initially thought he was "too handsome" for the role, but ultimately decided, "it was perfect to cast sort of the perfect male in this part." Weiner also sensed that Hamm had suffered the early loss of his parents, similarly to Draper's backstory. Hamm says that he used memories of his father to portray Draper, a well-dressed, influential man of business and society hiding great inner turmoil and experiencing changes in the world beyond his control.

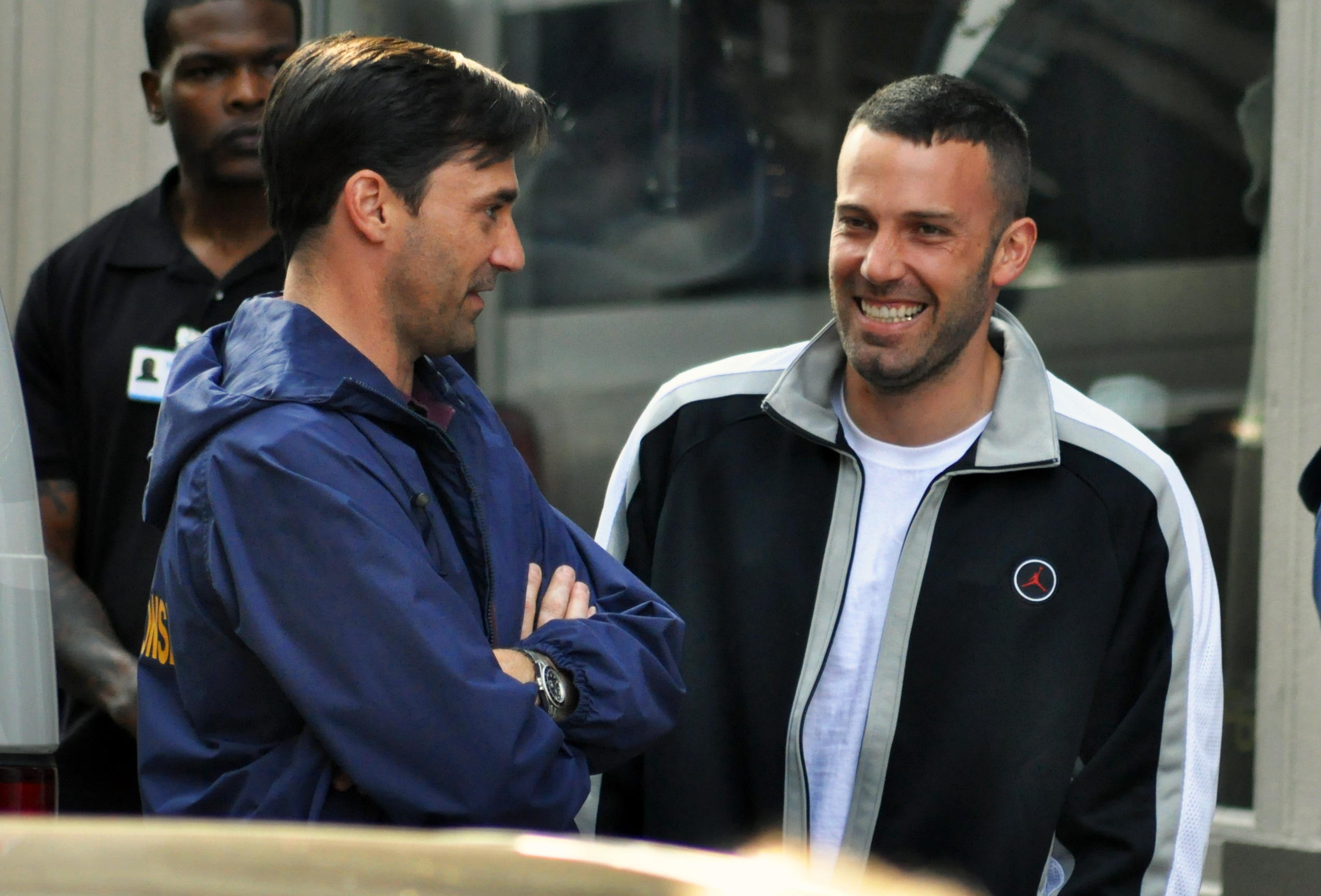
Hamm with Ben Affleck filming The Town (2010)

Mad Men debuted on July 19, 2007, with almost 1.4 million viewers. It developed a loyal audience, with Hamm receiving strong reviews. Robert Bianco of USA Today described Hamm's portrayal of Draper as "a starmaking performance," and The Boston Globe's Matthew Gilbert called Hamm a "brilliant lead." In 2008, Hamm won the Golden Globe Award for Best Actor in a Television Series – Drama and was nominated for the Screen Actors Guild Award for Outstanding Performance by a Male Actor and the Primetime Emmy Award for Outstanding Lead Actor in a Drama Series. In 2009, he was again nominated for the Golden Globe Award and Screen Actors Guild Award in the same category, and received another Primetime Emmy Award nomination for Outstanding Lead Actor in a Drama Series. In 2010, he received his third Golden Globe Award nomination. Mad Men concluded its seven-season run on May 17, 2015. Hamm received his first Primetime Emmy Award for Outstanding Lead Actor in a Drama Series on September 20, 2015, after receiving 12 nominations for acting in and producing the series.

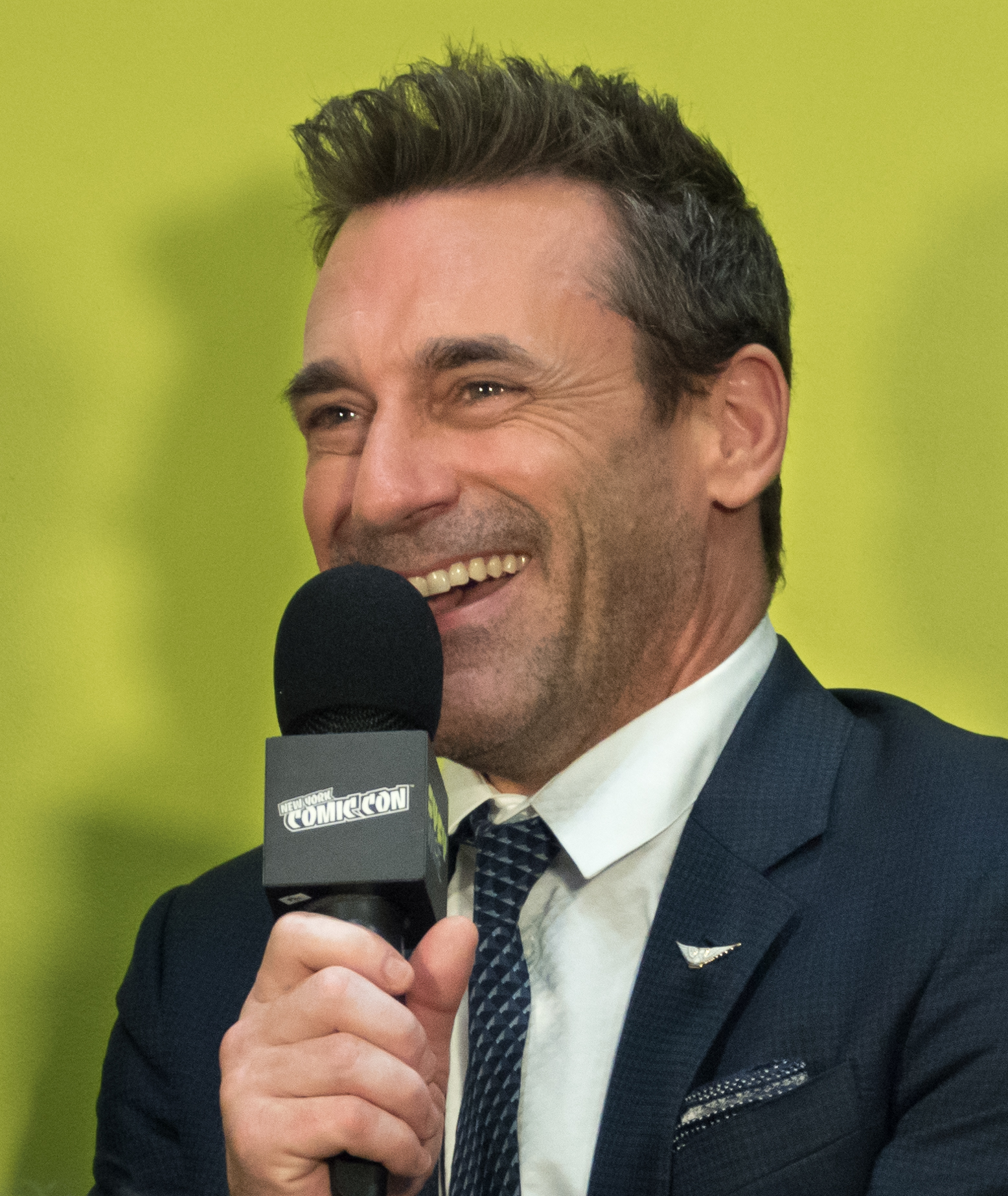
Hamm in 2019 promoting Good Omens

Hamm's next film role was in the 2008 science fiction movie The Day the Earth Stood Still, a remake of the classic 1951 film of the same name. It received mixed reviews but was financially successful, earning $230 million worldwide. Hamm hosted Saturday Night Live, season 34, episode 6, on October 25, 2008, and played various roles, including Don Draper in two sketches. He returned as host again on January 30 and October 30, 2010. Hamm hosted SNL for a fourth time on April 12, 2025. In the 15 years between his last two hosting appearances, Hamm was featured in 14 episodes as a cameo.

In 2009, he guest-starred in three episodes of the NBC television sitcom 30 Rock as Drew Baird, a doctor who is a neighbor and love interest of Liz Lemon (Tina Fey) earning three nominations for the Primetime Emmy Award for Outstanding Guest Actor in a Comedy Series. Hamm's first leading film role came with the independent mystery thriller Stolen in 2009, in which he played a police officer whose son has been missing for eight years. In 2010 he had a minor voice role in the animated feature Shrek Forever After as an ogre leader named Brogan. The film received mixed reviews but was a commercial success.

He played as an FBI agent in the crime drama The Town with Ben Affleck. After receiving "about 40 scripts that were all set in the 60s, or had me playing advertising guys," Hamm was pleased that The Town offered him a role that was "the opposite to Don Draper." It received generally favorable reviews and earned $144 million worldwide. His next acting role was as defense attorney Jake Ehrlich in the independent film Howl, based on Allen Ginsberg's eponymous 1956 poem. On December 12, 2010, he made a guest appearance as an FBI supervisor on Fox's animated series The Simpsons. He was featured in Zack Snyder's action-fantasy film Sucker Punch (2011) as the character High Roller and the doctor. He also had a supporting role in the comedy Bridesmaids as Kristen Wiig's "rude and arrogant sex buddy." He was next seen in the independent feature Friends with Kids (2011), which he produced with his then-partner Jennifer Westfeldt. The story concerns a group of friends whose lives are changed as the couples in the group begin to have children. Hamm and Westfedlt acted alongside Adam Scott, Kristen Wiig, Maya Rudolph, and Megan Fox.

He had a recurring role in the sitcom The Increasingly Poor Decisions of Todd Margaret in 2012, as the servant of sociopathic billionaire Dave Mountford (Blake Harrison). He hosted the 21st ESPYS Awards on July 17, 2013. He played sports agent J.B. Bernstein in Disney's sports drama Million Dollar Arm (2014). He appeared with Daniel Radcliffe in A Young Doctor's Notebook, playing an older version of Radcliffe's character, from December 2012 to December 2013. In December 2014, he guest-starred in a special Christmas episode of the British science fiction anthology series Black Mirror, titled "White Christmas." He had a number of roles in 2015, including the comedy show Unbreakable Kimmy Schmidt and Wet Hot American Summer: First Day of Camp. He also guest-starred in an episode of the British comedy series Toast of London playing himself opposite Matt Berry in series 3, episode 3, "Hamm On Toast". He was featured in the animated comedy Minions as the voice of Herb Overkill. Despite mixed reviews, the film was a major success, grossing over $1 billion worldwide.

=== 2016–present: Career expansion ===
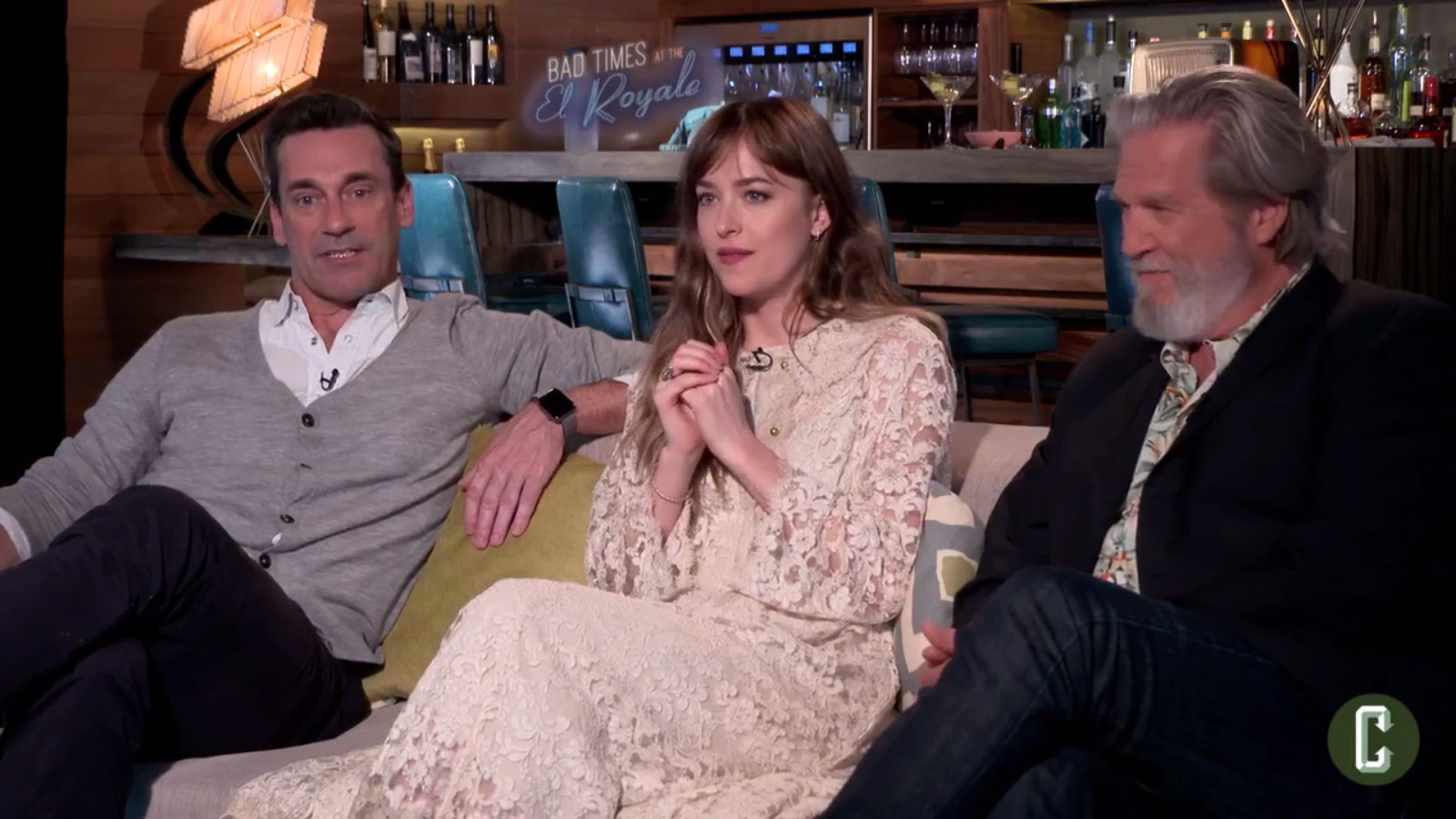
Hamm with Dakota Johnson and Jeff Bridges promoting Bad Times at the El Royale in 2018

Hamm was featured in the Greg Mottola comedy Keeping Up with the Joneses, alongside Zach Galifianakis and Gal Gadot. In 2017, he appeared in the science fiction film Marjorie Prime, which premiered at the 2017 Sundance Film Festival, and subsequently appeared in Edgar Wright's comedy crime film Baby Driver and the drama Aardvark, which premiered at the 2017 South by Southwest Festival and the 2017 Tribeca Film Festival, respectively. In 2018, Hamm appeared in the drama Nostalgia and the political thriller Beirut. Hamm appeared in the BBC and Amazon's 2019 television adaptation of Terry Pratchett and Neil Gaiman's Good Omens as the Archangel Gabriel. From 2020 to 2021, he played himself in a recurring role in the HBO comedy series Curb Your Enthusiasm, appearing opposite Larry David. During this time he voiced roles in Bless the Harts, Invincible, and Marvel's M.O.D.O.K..

In 2022, Hamm appeared in Top Gun: Maverick, the sequel to 1986's Top Gun. The same year, Hamm reunited with Greg Mottola on their second collaboration and his Mad Men co-star John Slattery for Confess, Fletch. It is the first installment in the Fletch series to not star Chevy Chase in the titular role. Hamm plays Fletch in the film and received positive reviews for his performance and comedic timing. It was released theatrically on September 16, 2022, and premiered on Showtime on October 28, 2022. The following year he joined the Apple TV+ drama series The Morning Show, appearing alongside Jennifer Aniston and Reese Witherspoon.

In 2023, Hamm played Sheriff Roy Tillman, one of the lead roles in the fifth season of the FX black comedy crime drama anthology series Fargo, reuniting him with series creator/showrunner Noah Hawley, with whom he had previously worked on Legion (2018) and Lucy in the Sky (2019). Hamm appeared in the second series, released in 2023, of Amazon's television adaptation of Terry Pratchett and Neil Gaiman's Good Omens, reprising his role as the Archangel Gabriel. In 2024, Hamm collaborated with Tina Fey acting in the movie musical adaptation of Mean Girls playing Coach Carr. He voices Marvin Flute in the animated Fox sitcom Grimsburg which he also executive produces. He also plays Monty Miller, CEO of MTex Oil in the Paramount+ series Landman.

In April 2025, he began starring in the Apple TV+ series Your Friends & Neighbors, his first lead role on television since Mad Men. The series has been renewed for a second season.

== Public image ==
Internationally considered to be a sex symbol, Hamm was named one of Salon's Sexiest Men Living in 2007 and one of People's Sexiest Men Alive in 2008. Entertainment Weekly named him one of their Entertainers of the Year in both 2008 and 2010. Hamm also won GQ's "International Man" award in September 2010.

In 2025, the scene of Jon Hamm (Andrew "Coop" Cooper) dancing to the Turn the Lights Off cover by Kato (DJ) in Your Friends & Neighbors became a meme on TikTok and other social platforms.

== Acting credits and accolades ==
Hamm has won an Emmy, two Golden Globes, and two Screen Actors Guild Awards, among others.

== Commercials and endorsements ==
In 2010, Mercedes-Benz hired Hamm (replacing actor Richard Thomas) as the new voiceover of their commercials, beginning with a commercial for the S400 Hybrid campaign. In 2013, American Airlines debuted a television commercial titled "Change is in the Air," featuring Hamm's voice-over. Hamm is an American Airlines frequent flier and his Mad Men character Don Draper often spoke of aspiring to win such accounts as American Airlines. Hamm has also appeared in several commercials in an ongoing ad campaign for H&R Block income tax services. He also appears in ongoing ads in Canada for SkipTheDishes. In January 2022 he appeared on an Apple TV+ ad titled "Everyone but Jon Hamm" showcasing the streaming service's wide array of A-list actresses and actors participating in original Apple productions. Also in 2022, Hamm was featured in a series of TV commercials for Progressive Insurance as having an off-and-on relationship with spokesperson Flo.

== Personal life ==
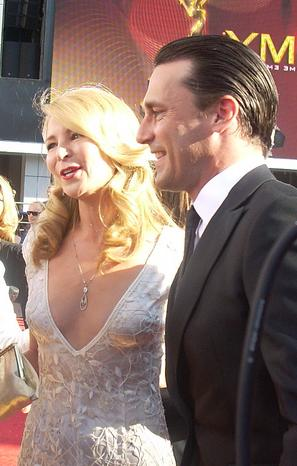
Hamm with his then-partner Jennifer Westfeldt at the 2008 Primetime Emmy Awards

Hamm stopped smoking at age twenty-four, but his role as Don Draper required him to smoke. Instead of actual cigarettes, he smoked herbal cigarettes that did not contain tobacco or nicotine.

In March 2015, Hamm's representative confirmed that he had recently completed in-patient treatment for alcoholism. Hamm also reported developing vitiligo during the filming of Season 1 of Mad Men.

Hamm has called himself a "sporadic reader." He has expressed his admiration for Marc Levinson's book The Box, finding it pertained to his upbringing and how the standardization of shipping containers changed his family's source of income. In the same interview, he expressed his admiration for Tom Wolfe's The Right Stuff, Dave Eggers's A Heartbreaking Work of Staggering Genius, John Irving's books The World According to Garp and A Prayer for Owen Meany, and Chad Harbach's book The Art of Fielding.

=== Relationships ===
Hamm was in a relationship with actress and screenwriter Jennifer Westfeldt, from 1997 to 2015. Along with Westfeldt, Hamm appeared in Gap-related campaign advertisements. In April 2009, Hamm and Westfeldt formed a production company, Points West Pictures.

In the 2015 series finale of Mad Men, filmed in 2014, actress Anna Osceola briefly appeared as the flower child receptionist at the California coastal retreat that Hamm's character stayed at. In 2020, it was confirmed that they were in a relationship and the couple became engaged in 2022. They married in June 2023, at Anderson Canyon in Big Sur, California, near the 9th anniversary of when the Mad Men scene was filmed, in its same location. In August 2026, it was announced that the couple were expecting their first child. They currently work together on Apple TV's Your Friends & Neighbors.

=== Sports involvement ===
Hamm is a devoted fan of the St. Louis Blues National Hockey League (NHL) team and has appeared in two television advertisements for the team. He is also a fan of the St. Louis Cardinals Major League Baseball (MLB) team and narrated the official highlight movie for the 2011 World Series, won by the Cardinals. He also narrates the Amazon NFL documentary series All or Nothing, as of 2015. In 2012, he played in the MLB Legend and Celebrity All Star Softball game as a member of the National League. He represented the Cardinals and hit a home run during the game. In 2018, he narrated the video The Saint Louis Browns: The Team That Baseball Forgot, presented by the Saint Louis Browns Historical Society.

=== Political views and activism ===
In the 2012 United States presidential election, Hamm supported incumbent president Barack Obama. In 2014, Hamm, Kerry Washington, and Kevin Love appeared in a PSA for stopping sexual assault on college campuses.

In October 2016, Hamm attended a Broadway fundraiser for Hillary Clinton. In May 2023, Hamm narrated an ad for Democratic candidate Lucas Kunce in his home state's 2024 United States Senate election, taking aim at incumbent Josh Hawley's alleged lack of courage notably running and hiding from the January 6, 2021 mob of Capitol rioters.

In January 2024, Hamm endorsed Adam Schiff in his bid for the 2024 United States Senate elections in California and sent a political fundraising email on his campaign's behalf.

Hamm is a long time supporter of St. Jude Children's Research Hospital.
