= Lucas Kunce =

American politician (born 1982)

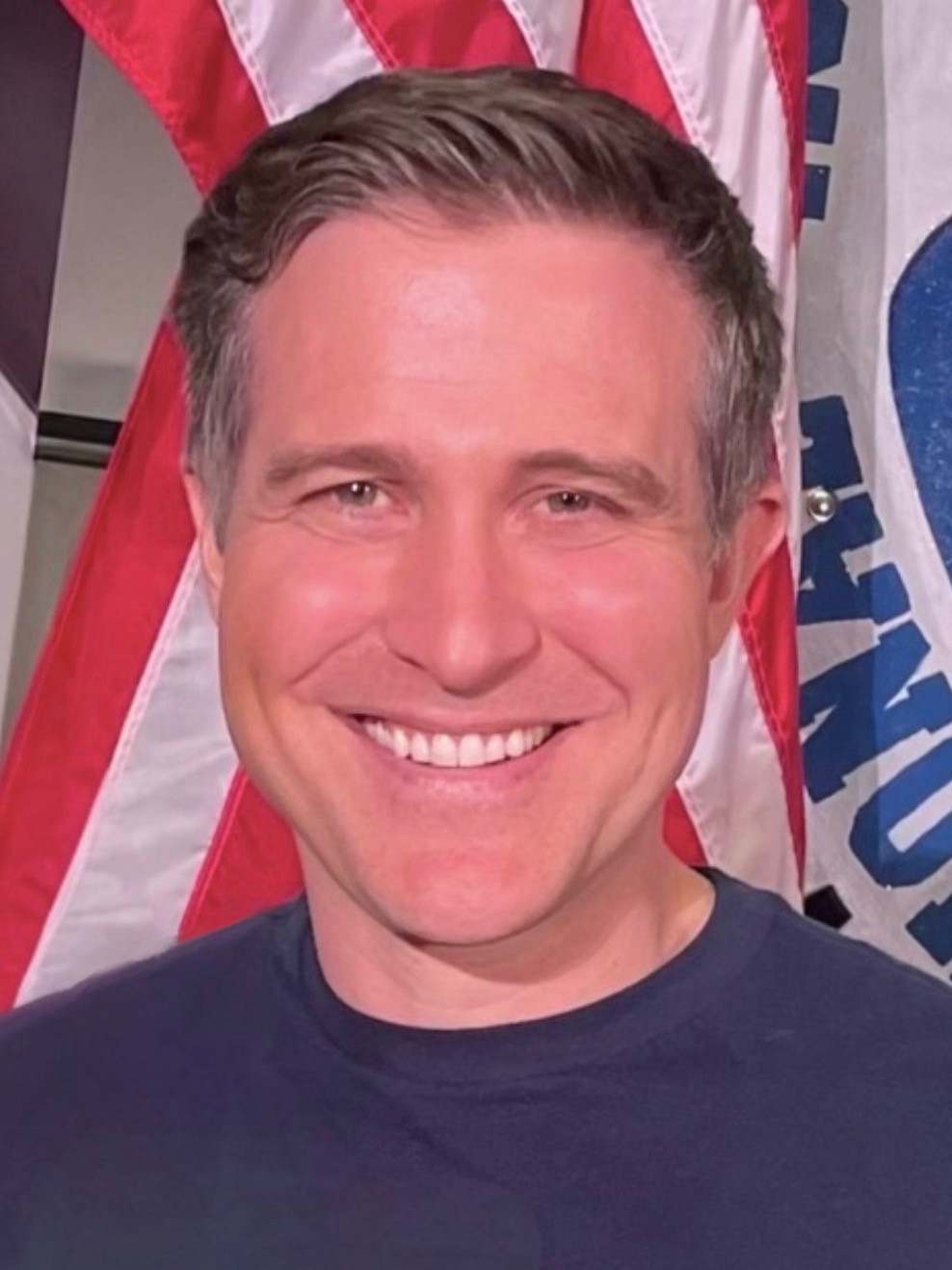
- Kunce in 2024
- Born: Lucas Tyree Kunce; October 6, 1982 (age 44); Hartsburg, Missouri, U.S.
- Education: Yale University (BA); University of Missouri (JD); Columbia University (LLM)
- Political party: Democratic
- Spouses: Jaime Hoog (divorced); Marilyn Martinez (m. 2023)
- Children: 4
- Military career
- Branch: United States Marine Corps
- Service years: 2007–2020, 2025 (active); 2020–2025 (reserve)
- Rank: Lieutenant colonel
- Unit: United States Marine Forces Special Operations Command
- Conflicts: Iraq War; War in Afghanistan
- Website: Campaign website

Lucas Tyree Kunce (/kuːnts/ KOONTS; born October 6, 1982) is an American attorney, Marine veteran, and politician. He was the Democratic nominee for the 2024 United States Senate election in Missouri, losing to Republican incumbent Josh Hawley.

Before entering politics, Kunce was in the United States Marine Corps. He served a tour in Iraq and two tours in Afghanistan, during which he deployed on special-operations task forces and worked with security services. After returning to the U.S., he joined the Joint Staff of the Pentagon, where he represented the U.S. in arms control negotiations with Russia and NATO. In 2020, he joined the American Economic Liberties Project, where he is the director of national security. As of 2025, he manages a hybrid PAC called Heartland Patriots and has stated he will return to active duty in the Marine Corps.

== Early life and education ==
Kunce was born in Hartsburg, Missouri, and grew up in Jefferson City in a working-class family. His father worked for the Missouri Department of Conservation, while his mother retired to care for his sister, who had heart problems and underwent multiple open-heart surgeries. His family faced financial struggles as a result, eventually going bankrupt.

Kunce graduated from Jefferson City High School in 2000 as valedictorian and class president. He then attended Yale University on a Pell Grant, obtaining a Bachelor of Arts degree in classical civilization. He competed for the school track and ultimate frisbee teams, and joined the cheerleading team in 2003 as the first male member of the team's current incarnation. Kunce graduated from Yale in 2004, and obtained a Juris Doctor degree from the University of Missouri School of Law. He was admitted to the Missouri Bar on September 12, 2007. In 2016, he received a Master of Laws degree from Columbia Law School.

== Early career ==
=== 2006 Missouri House campaign ===
In 2006, while attending law school at the University of Missouri, Kunce ran for the Missouri House of Representatives seat for District 113. He received 44% of the vote, losing to the Republican incumbent, Mark Bruns.

=== Military service ===
In 2007, Kunce joined the United States Marine Corps as a judge-advocate (military lawyer) in the Judge Advocate division. He served a tour in Iraq, leading a police training team in the Sunni Triangle, and two tours in Afghanistan, during which he deployed on special-operations task forces, learned Pashto, worked with Afghan national security forces, and interviewed members of the Taliban. In Iraq, Kunce was exposed to toxic burn pits at Al Taqaddum Airbase.

After returning to the U.S., Kunce served as the International Negotiations Officer on the Joint Staff of the Pentagon, where he represented the U.S. in arms control negotiations with Russia and NATO. He joined the Council on Foreign Relations in June 2017. In 2019 he wrote an opinion article for The New York Times.

After 13 years in the Marines, Kunce joined the American Economic Liberties Project as director of national security in August 2020. He continues to serve in the United States Marine Corps Reserve with the rank of lieutenant colonel.

== U.S. Senate campaigns ==
=== 2022 ===
On March 9, 2021, the day after U.S. Senator Roy Blunt announced he would not seek reelection in 2022, Kunce announced his candidacy for the open seat. He was endorsed by the League of Conservation Voters, Progressive Change Campaign Committee, and VoteVets. As of December 31, 2021, Kunce had raised $2.48 million, the most of any candidate for the seat. He said he did not accept corporate campaign donations. Throughout his campaign, he emphasized his outsider status, advertising both his lack of political experience and poorer upbringing.

In March 2022, Kunce reported that his campaign's Independence office was burgled, with "tens of thousands of dollars' worth of equipment and other resources" reported missing. In July, his campaign mailed a cease-and-desist letter to primary opponent Trudy Busch Valentine for allegedly airing advertisements "containing these deliberate lies with actual malice toward Mr. Kunce in an effort to deceive Missouri voters".

Kunce lost the August 2 Democratic primary to Valentine by a margin of 5%.

=== 2024 ===
On January 6, 2023, Kunce announced his second run for U.S. Senate in a bid to unseat one-term incumbent Josh Hawley. He defeated State Senator Karla May, December L. Harmon, and Mita Biswas in the August 6 Democratic primary. He was endorsed by Reproductive Freedom for All, VoteVets, Missouri State Council of Fire Fighters, End Citizens United, and Missouri AFL-CIO.

Kunce attended a Missouri Press Association debate alongside Hawley and other minor candidates on September 20. A second debate, hosted by Nexstar Media Group, was held on October 31. Kunce failed to unseat Hawley, losing the election by 14%.

== Political positions ==
Kunce is described as a progressive politician. He has voiced his support for "repealing or revising" Section 230. Kunce has said that he would have voted for the John Lewis Voting Rights Act and For the People Act. He supports public Social Security. He opposes the death penalty.

=== Abortion ===
Kunce supports abortion rights, including 2024 Missouri Amendment 3. In June 2022, after Roe v. Wade was overturned, he voiced his support for codifying access to abortion in federal law. Later, he suggested that the Democrat-majority Senate should abolish the filibuster to accomplish this. Kunce supports the Women's Health Protection Act, which encourages more access to abortion. He supports making abortion free under a universal health care system and wants to repeal the Hyde Amendment.

=== Agriculture ===
Kunce has pledged to introduce legislation at the federal level to ban foreign ownership of American agricultural land, and seize and resell land already owned by foreigners. In an opinion article for The Joplin Globe, he voiced opposition to a National Animal Identification System, claiming it was written to "line the pockets of Big Ag while screwing independent farmers".

=== Campaign finance ===
Kunce says he does not accept corporate campaign donations. He has voiced his support for abolishing corporate PACs and requiring Congress to disclose when a piece of legislation is written by a lobbyist or special interest group. He has voiced his support for banning members of Congress from owning stock, including blind trusts. He has also supported banning defense contractors and family members of sitting members of Congress from serving as lobbyists.

=== Drug policy ===
Kunce has condemned the war on drugs, citing the taxpayer cost, high number of arrests for nonviolent offenses, and disproportionate impact on Black Americans. He has said he would push to legalize cannabis nationwide and reassess related convictions.

=== Energy and environment ===
In an opinion article for The American Prospect, Kunce voiced his support for a rapid decarbonization plan costing $4.5 trillion, completely ending the use of fossil fuels in the energy and transportation sectors. He said the primary motivation for the wars in Afghanistan and Iraq was to secure their oil supplies and that ending U.S. reliance on fossil fuels would reduce military intervention. He also said the plan would help limit the impact of climate change. As a temporary means of becoming energy independent, he has suggested that he would support U.S. oil production for domestic use. He has said that he would have voted for the Infrastructure Investment and Jobs Act.

Kunce's candidacy was endorsed by the environmental advocacy organization League of Conservation Voters.

=== Foreign policy ===
Kunce has called his economic proposals collectively a "Marshall Plan for the Midwest", aiming to reshore manufacturing jobs and reduce funding of foreign military interventions in favor of domestic infrastructure and industry investment. He has condemned U.S. military nation-building campaigns in foreign countries such as Afghanistan, and advocated reducing military funding in favor of domestic development. He has said he did not support the 2003 invasion of Iraq and that the U.S. should militarily intervene in other countries only in cases of self-defense, citing the initial stages of the invasion of Afghanistan after the September 11 attacks as an example. He has called on the U.S. to "recruit and welcome" immigrants from all countries. He opposes U.S.-based businesses offshoring manufacturing and foreign ownership of U.S. agricultural land.

Kunce supports attracting educated immigrants to the U.S. to attract wealth and benefit the creation of new industries. He supports the 2024 bipartisan border bill in the U.S. Senate written by Republican James Lankford and Democrat Chris Murphy. He has said building up the Mexico–United States border wall is the "least effective thing" to reduce illegal immigration.

==== Afghanistan ====
After joining the Marine Corps in 2007, Kunce served two tours in Afghanistan. In an interview with The American Prospect, he said the U.S. "should have left in 2002 or 2003 instead of trying to build [Afghanistan] up for 20 years." He has said the 2021 Taliban takeover of Afghanistan was "inevitable from the very beginning" and blamed defense contractors, corrupt Afghan commanders, and U.S. politicians who "used the war to get into office" for prolonging the conflict. He has suggested that he supports opening diplomatic relations with the Taliban.

==== China ====
In an opinion article for The American Prospect, Kunce said he recognized China as a serious "economic challenge" and that it was "hacking [American] dedication to self-interest", citing a 1996 deal between the U.S.-based Loral Space & Communications and the Chinese state-owned Aerospace Science and Technology Corporation that quickened the development of Chinese missile equipment in violation of the Arms Export Control Act as an early example of the issue. As other examples, he cited and condemned the 2001 Chinese accession into the World Trade Organization and the 2012 acquisition of AMC Theatres by Chinese-based Wanda Group. He has said that the U.S. relies too much on Chinese manufacturing, and that large U.S. companies are too subservient to Chinese interests. He has condemned American universities for accepting Chinese students funded by the People's Liberation Army, saying students use their time in the U.S. to study emerging tech and then take their research back to the PLA, but has also suggested that the U.S. more intentionally recruit Chinese students and workers in the U.S. into long-term work in U.S.-based industries and help them become citizens.

Kunce has proposed artificially raising the cost of offshoring to China by requiring U.S.-based businesses to reimburse the government for any public subsidies they received before offshoring, creating a targeted tax to penalize U.S.-based businesses that offshore, and/or increasing fines for businesses that break market laws to match the amount the business gained from breaking said laws. He has also proposed forcing joint ventures for Chinese-based companies who wish to set up in the U.S., and federally backing loans for U.S.-based businesses wishing to get into industries "captured" by China. The industries would include manufacturing of printed circuit boards, semiconductors, telecommunication devices and products on the solar value chain. He has expressed support for invoking the International Emergency Economic Powers Act and Defense Production Act of 1950 to do this in some circumstances. He has said that the U.S. military advantage over China has been "slipping away" and blamed the U.S.'s "monopoly crisis" for stifling development, citing the buyout of U.S.-based military telecommunications manufacturer Lucent and the rise of Chinese state-funded telecommunications company Huawei as examples. He has condemned the consolidation and offshoring of U.S. military-industrial manufacturing as a threat to national security, saying it can lead to kickbacks or market failure. He has suggested banning Chinese investment in U.S.-based companies.

Kunce has said that the U.S. should avoid going to war over China-Taiwan relations and that the U.S. economy "would absolutely shut down" if China invaded Taiwan due to U.S. reliance on Taiwan's semiconductor industry. He said the primary motivation for U.S. intervention in Taiwan would be to protect that industry, and proposed that the U.S. invest in American semiconductor manufacturers such as Intel in order to combat that reliance, allowing it to stay out of a possible conflict.

==== Israel ====
Kunce condemned the 2023 Hamas-led attack on Israel and called for a ceasefire in October 2023. In November, during start of the Gaza war, he said he was "standing behind Israel." In July, he called Israeli Prime Minister Benjamin Netanyahu a "bad actor" and said the U.S. should use its leverage to advocate for a bilateral ceasefire.

==== Russia ====
In a statement following the 2022 Russian invasion of Ukraine, Kunce called Russian President Vladimir Putin a "tyrant" and condemned the invasion, as well as the previous Russian invasions of Georgia and Crimea. He has said the U.S. should militarily "fulfill [its] NATO obligations—that’s it", and combat the invasion by sanctioning Russian oligarchs and helping Western Europe stop purchasing Russian gas by creating and selling them alternative renewable energy technologies. He later indicated support for U.S. military aid and humanitarian aid to Ukraine.

=== Gun control ===
Kunce supports gun control. He says he supports abolishing the filibuster to support more gun control legislation and wants more universal background checks and expanded red flag laws. Though he says it was not comprehensive enough, he has said he would have voted for the Bipartisan Safer Communities Act. He has said that the minimum age to purchase a gun should be raised to 21. He opposes the National Rifle Association of America.

=== Health care ===
Kunce supports a universal health care system and has said he may be open to supporting Medicare for All. He has also voiced his support for expanding access to health services for veterans, including mental health services and medical marijuana.

Kunce has condemned "abusive prices" set by insulin producers and has proposed charging companies Eli Lilly and Company, Novo Nordisk, and Sanofi with monopolization of insulin production under the Sherman Antitrust Act. He has proposed the creation of government-funded insulin production facilities in Missouri, later to be turned over to the private sector, saying "the government should fund things, not run things." He has voiced support for efforts to lower prescription drug prices introduced through the Inflation Reduction Act and price ceilings.

=== Labor rights ===
Kunce has voiced his support for "the union way of life," and has said that trade unions lead to "better wages, benefits, and protections" for workers. He has advocated raising the federal minimum wage to $15/hour. He has said he would have voted for the Protecting the Right to Organize Act (PRO Act), and he says will push for legislation that ensures paid family, medical, and sick leave for all workers. He has said he would like to strengthen the Equal Employment Opportunity Commission. He has identified "pay discrimination against Americans with disabilities" and "workplace harassment" as key labor rights issues as well. He has implied that he would support federally mandating worker representation on corporate boards of directors.

In Kunce's 2006 Missouri House campaign, he received $650 in donations from local union chapters. In 2019, he wrote an opinion article for The New York Times voicing his opposition to Google and Microsoft workers who protested the sale of their products to the military, saying that if tech companies "work with the military, then technologies from applications of A.I. to augmented reality would save innocent lives and reduce suffering," and voicing the opinion that workers would be better off protesting the war in Afghanistan directly. In 2021, he visited a drive in favor of Amazon worker organization in Bessemer, Alabama. In 2022, he visited drives for Starbucks unions as well as the International Brotherhood of Electrical Workers in Missouri.

=== LGBTQIA+ rights ===
Kunce supports transgender rights. He supports federally outlawing conversion therapy, and has said he would have voted for the Equality Act. He will work toward ending the violence against transgender people in the United States. Kunce supports providing gender-affirming care for trans youth.

During LGBTQIA+ Pride Month, Kunce attended pride parades in St. Louis, Kansas City, and Springfield.

=== Racial justice ===
Kunce supports investment in minority-serving institutions and historically black colleges and universities, and advocated for a federally funded student loan forgiveness program. He has supported legislation intended to counter the rise in xenophobia and racism related to the COVID-19 pandemic.

=== Taxation ===
Kunce supports the child tax credit and ending taxes on tips, and has pledged to support tax cuts for people earning under $400,000 annually.

== Personal life ==
Kunce resides in Independence, Missouri, and owns a home in Washington, D.C. where he lived while working as a Marine. He is an Episcopalian and a member of the Grace Episcopal Church. He is bilingual, speaking Pashto and English. In February 2023, Kunce married Marilyn Martinez. They have a son, born in 2023 at Children's Mercy Hospital. Kunce also has two sons from his first marriage. In April 2025, Kunce and Martinez had welcomed another son.

== Shooting incident ==
During the 2024 Senate campaign, Kunce hosted an event at a private residence with former U.S. Representative Adam Kinzinger. At the event, Kunce and Kinzinger shot AR-15s at steel targets from a close distance. While Kunce was shooting, a bullet fragment or steel target fragment hit a reporter, sending him to the hospital with a minor wound to his arm.

In the event's aftermath, gun safety experts widely criticized the dangerous setup. Steve Hendrick, who operates Shield Firearms Training in Kansas City, said a range of 10 yards or so would have been too close for an AR-15, given the gun's high velocity. He cautioned that he wasn't present and had only reviewed photos of the event, but said, "Just as a general rule, it looked like they were way closer than they should have been if they were shooting steel".

Following the incident, Kunce was criticized by his opponent Josh Hawley.

== See also ==
- 2024 United States Senate election in Missouri
- 2022 United States Senate election in Missouri
- 2022 Missouri elections

Party political offices
Preceded by Claire McCaskill	Democratic nominee for U.S. Senator from Missouri (Class 1); 2024	Most recent
