= Million Dollar Arm =

2014 film by Craig Gillespie

- Theatrical release poster
- Directed by: Craig Gillespie
- Written by: Tom McCarthy
- Produced by: Michael Mandt; Neil Mandt; Joe Roth; Mark Ciardi; Gordon Gray
- Starring: Jon Hamm; Aasif Mandvi; Bill Paxton; Suraj Sharma; Lake Bell; Alan Arkin
- Cinematography: Gyula Pados
- Edited by: Tatiana S. Riegel
- Music by: A. R. Rahman
- Production companies: Walt Disney Pictures; Roth Films; Mayhem Pictures
- Distributed by: Walt Disney Studios Motion Pictures
- Release dates: May 6, 2014 (El Capitan Theatre); May 16, 2014 (United States)
- Running time: 124 minutes
- Country: United States
- Language: English; Hindi
- Budget: $25 million
- Box office: $39.2 million

Million Dollar Arm is a 2014 American biographical sports drama film directed by Craig Gillespie and produced by Walt Disney Pictures from a screenplay written by Tom McCarthy. The film is based on the true story of baseball pitchers Rinku Singh and Dinesh Patel who were discovered by sports agent J. B. Bernstein after winning a reality show competition.

The film stars Jon Hamm as J. B. Bernstein, Bill Paxton as pitching coach Tom House, Suraj Sharma as Singh, Madhur Mittal as Patel, and Alan Arkin. The film's music is composed by A. R. Rahman. Produced by Joe Roth, Mark Ciardi, and Gordon Gray, the film was released theatrically on May 16, 2014. Million Dollar Arm grossed $39.2 million.

== Plot ==
Sports agent J. B. Bernstein and his business partner Ash Vasudevan have formed their own struggling company in Los Angeles, but all J. B.'s clients have retired, and he is unable to reel in star NFL player Popo Vanuatu. Desperate for new clients, J. B. realizes the potential for untapped baseball talent among cricket players in India. He and Ash approach investor Mr. Chang with a proposal — "Million Dollar Arm", an Indian talent contest to find two winning pitchers who will be flown to the U.S. and coached to become Major League Baseball prospects. J. B. secures Chang's funding by agreeing that the winners will be ready for a major league tryout in one year.

Veteran pitching coach Tom House warns that baseball is too different from cricket bowling, but J. B. convinces him to take on the challenge of coaching the winners. In Mumbai, J. B. is guided by local businessman Vivek and hires enthusiastic Amit Rohan as his interpreter, and bonds over Skype with his tenant back home, Brenda. Joined by Ray Poitevint, a curmudgeonly major league scout, they hold tryouts in numerous cities until two winners emerge — Rinku Singh and Dinesh Patel.

Vivek reminds J. B. that this is a life-changing opportunity for the boys, who bid an emotional farewell to their families. They and Amit are flown to the U.S., and J. B. is disappointed to learn Brenda has a boyfriend. Rinku, Dinesh, and Amit are kicked out of their hotel after being overwhelmed by the elevator, forcing J. B. to invite them to stay at his home. Never having played baseball before, the boys struggle with House's training and feel neglected by J. B. as he tries to keep his company afloat.

Invited to a party thrown by Popo, J. B. takes the boys and Amit, but is forced to them home when Amit gets drunk after mistaking a margarita for punch and Rinku becomes sick from overeating; they both vomit inside J. B.'s Porsche, and by the time he gets back to the party, Popo has already signed with someone else. Brenda helps him realize he needs to invest in the boys' wellbeing, and he trades his car in for a Dodge Caravan. Spending more time with the boys as their English and baseball skills improve, J. B. and a newly single Brenda share a kiss.

Under pressure from Chang, who demands that the boys demonstrate their progress at a well-publicized tryout, J. B. lashes out at Brenda. Various media outlets, including ESPN and Sports Illustrated, join major league scouts to see the boys pitch in Tempe, Arizona, with their families and Vivek watching in India. The tryout is a disaster as Rinku and Dinesh, nervous and underprepared, fail to impress anyone. Chang congratulates J. B. on a successful publicity stunt and extends their deal, but declares that Rinku and Dinesh are done.

Refusing to abandon Rinku and Dinesh for the sake of Million Dollar Arm's success, J. B. organizes another tryout, without Chang's support. J. B. is unable to interest any scouts, but Ray arranges for him to meet the head scout for the Pittsburgh Pirates, who missed the first tryout and agrees to come. Amit, Dinesh, and Rinku prepare a romantic backyard date for Brenda and J. B., who insists the boys relax and have fun with their second chance. Amit delivers an inspiring speech to Rinku and Dinesh, who impress Chang and the scouts with accurate 90+ mph fastballs.

An epilogue reveals footage of the real Rinku and Dinesh, who were offered contracts by the Pirates, becoming the first Indian athletes signed by a major American sports league; Amit returned to India to coach baseball; and J. B. and Brenda started a family, and continued Million Dollar Arm.

== Cast ==
- Jon Hamm as J.B.
- Aasif Mandvi as Ash
- Bill Paxton as Tom House
- Suraj Sharma as Rinku
- Lake Bell as Brenda
- Alan Arkin as Ray Poitevint
- Madhur Mittal as Dinesh
- Pitobash Tripathy as Amit Rohan (Deepesh Solanki)
- Tzi Ma as Chang
- Darshan Jariwala as Vivek
- Sudev Nair as News Anchor
- Greg Alan Williams as Doug
- Allyn Rachel as Theresa
- Rey Maualuga as Popo

ESPN personalities Jayson Stark, Karl Ravech, and Steve Levy, journalist Ken Rosenthal, and retired Major League Baseball players Barry Larkin and Curt Schilling have cameo appearances in the film.

== Production ==
In 2008, television sports producers and brothers Neil and Michael Mandt began documenting the training and tryouts that Singh and Patel were undergoing at the USC campus. Using original footage they had shot, they created a nine-minute trailer as a presentation piece for a projected movie about the two players. In December 2008, the Mandts began a collaboration with producers Mark Ciardi, Gordon Gray and Joe Roth. In early 2009, the screen rights to Singh and Patel's life story were purchased by Sony Pictures Entertainment for development at Columbia Pictures, which hired Mitch Glazer to write a screenplay.

The project was eventually put in turnaround and in 2010, producers Roth and Ciardi set the film up at Walt Disney Pictures. Upon acquiring the film, Disney hired Tom McCarthy to write a script. In May 2012, Jon Hamm was hired to play J. B. Bernstein. Alan Arkin and Suraj Sharma were hired in April 2013, with Allyn Rachel joining the cast the following month. Principal photography began on May 30, 2013 with filming taking place in Mumbai, Atlanta, and Los Angeles.

=== Music ===
A. R. Rahman composed the film's score. The soundtrack album was digitally released by Walt Disney Records on May 13, 2014 whereas the CD release was released on May 19, 2014.

== Release ==
The first trailer was released on December 23, 2013 and attached theatrically with Saving Mr. Banks. Disney heavily promoted the film through its ESPN division, with Bill Simmons being credited an executive producer on the film. The film was fully screened at CinemaCon in March 2014, wherein Walt Disney Studios chairman Alan Horn claimed that it was the highest-tested film during his tenure at either Disney or Warner Bros., including the first Harry Potter film. The film held its world premiere at the El Capitan Theatre on May 6, 2014.

=== Home media ===
Million Dollar Arm was released by Walt Disney Studios Home Entertainment on Blu-ray Disc and DVD on October 7, 2014.

== Reception ==
=== Box office ===
Million Dollar Arm grossed $36.4 million in North America and $2.8 million in other territories for a total gross of $39.2 million, against a budget of $25 million.

In its opening weekend, the film grossed $10.5 million, finishing in fourth place at the box office behind fellow new release Godzilla ($95.1 million), as well as Neighbors ($25.2 million) and The Amazing Spider-Man 2 ($16.8 million).

=== Critical response ===
The film review aggregator website Rotten Tomatoes reports that prior to release Million Dollar Arm received a 65% approval rating from critics, based on 145 reviews with an average score of 6.00/10. The site's consensus reads: "Pleasant to a fault, Million Dollar Arm is a middle-of-the-plate pitch that coasts on Jon Hamm's considerable charm without adding any truly original curves to Disney's inspirational sports formula." Metacritic gave the film a score of 56 out of 100, based on 38 critics, indicating "mixed or average reviews". Audiences polled by CinemaScore gave the film an average grade of "A−" on an A+ to F scale.

Scott Foundas of Variety described the film as a "sharp, slickly produced addition to the Disney sports movie canon [that] works as both a stirring underdog tale and as a revealing look at the expanding global footprint of the American sports-entertainment machine." Foundas also praised McCarthy's screenplay and Gillespie's direction, elaborating that they "put across the movie's many cliches with a certain verve, and find room for unexpected detours and grace notes in an overall familiar trajectory." Michael Rechtshaffen of The Hollywood Reporter also praised the film, writing, "Dutifully covering all the requisite inspirational sports movie/fish-out-of-water bases yet still managing to throw a few fresh curves into the mix, Disney's Million Dollar Arm assuredly hits a home run." Chris Nashawaty of Entertainment Weekly gave the film a "B−" grade, comparing it to Jerry Maguire, and calling Hamm's performance one of the film's highlights.

Alonso Duralde of The Wrap criticized the film's predictability and excessive sentimentality.

The Academy of Motion Picture Arts and Sciences placed Million Dollar Arm on its shortlist of potential nominees for the Academy Award for Best Original Score and Best Original Song (for "Million Dollar Dream", "Spreading the Word/Makhna", and "We Could Be Kings"), but ultimately was not nominated for either award.

=== Accolades ===
Award	Category	Recipient(s)	Result	Ref(s)
Teen Choice Awards	Choice Movie: Drama		Nominated	
Teen Choice Awards	Choice Movie Actor: Drama	Jon Hamm	Nominated	

== See also ==
- List of baseball films
