= Mark Ciardi =

American film producer and former Major League Baseball pitcher (born 1961)

- Pitcher
- Born: August 19, 1961 (age 65); New Brunswick, New Jersey
- Batted: Right Threw: Right

MLB debut
- April 9, 1987, for the Milwaukee Brewers

Last MLB appearance
- April 27, 1987, for the Milwaukee Brewers

MLB statistics
- Win–loss record: 1–1
- Earned run average: 9.37
- Strikeouts: 8
- Stats at Baseball Reference

Teams
- Milwaukee Brewers (1987)

Mark Thomas Ciardi (pronounced CHAR-dee; born August 19, 1961) is an American film producer and former Major League Baseball pitcher. He is the founder and president of Select Films, an independent content production firm that also serves as a financier for media properties.

Prior to Select Films, Ciardi was the co-founder of Mayhem Pictures, which had an overall first-look deal with Walt Disney Studios for twelve years. At Mayhem, Ciardi produced several sports films for Walt Disney Pictures, including The Rookie, Miracle, Invincible, The Game Plan, Secretariat, Million Dollar Arm, McFarland, USA, and Safety.

Ciardi also produced A Million Miles Away for Amazon Studios, as well as Chappaquiddick, The Miracle Season, and the Lionsgate film American Underdog. He also produced the Emmy Award-winning ESPN 30 for 30 documentary Big Shot and the 30 for 30 documentary 42 to 1.

A native of Piscataway, New Jersey, Ciardi was an All-State high school pitcher, graduating from Piscataway Township High School as part of the class of 1979.

He continued his baseball career at the University of Maryland, where he earned his Bachelor of Science degree in Business Administration. He was drafted in 1983 by the Milwaukee Brewers organization and was called up to the major leagues in 1987. He retired the following year due to an injury.

Ciardi is a member of the Academy of Motion Picture Arts and Sciences and served on the board of trustees at the University of Maryland. He is married with two children and resides in Los Angeles.

== Filmography ==
He was a producer in all films unless otherwise noted.

=== Film ===
Year	Film	Credit
2002	The Rookie	
2002	The New Guy	
2004	Miracle	
2006	Invincible	
2007	The Game Plan	
2010	Secretariat	
2010	Tooth Fairy	
2014	Million Dollar Arm	
2015	McFarland, USA	
2016	Fallen	
2017	Chappaquiddick	
2018	The Miracle Season	
2020	The Way Back	Executive producer
2020	Safety	
2021	American Underdog	
2023	A Million Miles Away	
2023	The Senior	
TBA	Heat	
TBA	Wish List	

As an actor

Year	Film	Role
1998	Welcome to Hollywood	Operation Redline Production Crew
2000	Me, Myself & Irene	Softball Player
2002	The Rookie	Tim Stewart
2005	Fever Pitch	1980's Sox Player

=== Television ===
Year	Title	Credit	Notes
2013−18	30 for 30	Executive producer	Documentary
2020	Legacy	Executive producer	Documentary
2020	Benedict Men	Executive producer	Documentary

== Major League Baseball career ==
Ciardi played for the Milwaukee Brewers in 1987. He opened the season on the Milwaukee Brewers roster in which they started the season with 13 consecutive wins, winning the eighth game in that streak against the Orioles, but losing the 14th game of the season. The opening 13-game winning streak is a record that still stands today. Ciardi remained in the big leagues for one month that year, then retired the following year due to a shoulder injury. In 2023, the record was tied by the Tampa Bay Rays, who were the subject of the first film that Ciardi produced.
