= 2016 Missouri elections =

Missouri elections, 2016
- November 8th, 2016

The 2016 Missouri elections took place on November 8, 2016. Republicans swept all statewide offices up for election, expanding their footprint in the state. The only two remaining Democratic statewide officeholders after this cycle were U.S. Senator Claire McCaskill and State Auditor Nicole Galloway.

== Presidential ==
Republican candidate Donald Trump carried the state by a wide margin. Democrat Hillary Clinton received 37.87% of the vote to Trump's 56.38%. Clinton's performance in the state was the worst for a Democratic presidential nominee since that of George McGovern in 1972.

== United States Senate ==
Incumbent Roy Blunt faced Missouri Secretary of State Jason Kander in the general election. Blunt underperformed Donald Trump by nearly 15 points, but he won nonetheless.

Missouri general election
Party	Candidate	Votes	%	±%
Republican	Roy Blunt	1,378,458	49.18	−5.05%
Democratic	Jason Kander	1,300,200	46.39	+5.76%
Libertarian	Jonathan Dine	67,738	2.42	−0.60%
Green	Johnathan McFarland	30,743	1.10	N/A
Constitution	Fred Ryman	25,407	0.91	−1.22%
	Write-ins	95	0.03	N/A
Plurality		78,258	2.79	
Total votes		2,802,641	100.00	
Republican hold				

== United States House of Representatives ==
United States House of Representatives elections in Missouri, 2016
Party	Votes	Percentage	Seats before	Seats after	+/–
Republican	1,600,524	58.20%	6	6	Steady
Democratic	1,041,306	37.86%	2	2	Steady
Libertarian	96,492	3.51%	0	0	Steady
Green	8,136	0.30%	0	0	Steady
Constitution	3,605	0.13%	0	0	Steady
Write-ins	16	<0.01%	0	0	Steady
Totals	2,750,079	100.00%	8	8	0

== Governor ==
Missouri gubernatorial election, 2016
Party	Candidate	Votes	%	±%
Republican	Eric Greitens	1,433,397	51.14%	+8.61%
Democratic	Chris Koster	1,277,360	45.57%	−9.20%
Libertarian	Cisse Spragins	41,154	1.47%	−1.22%
Independent	Lester Benton Turilli, Jr.	30,019	1.07%	N/A
Green	Don Fitz	21,088	0.75%	N/A
Write-in		28	0.00%	0.00%
Total votes		2,803,046	100.00%	N/A
Republican gain from Democratic				

== Lieutenant governor ==
2016 Missouri lieutenant gubernatorial election
Party	Candidate	Votes	%	±%
Republican	Mike Parson	1,459,392	52.80%	+3.64%
Democratic	Russ Carnahan	1,168,947	42.29%	−2.94%
Libertarian	Steven R. Hedrick	69,253	2.50%	−0.31%
Green	Jennifer Leach	66,490	2.41%	N/A
Independent	Jake Wilburn (write-in)	87	0.00%	N/A
Total votes		2,764,169	100.0%	N/A
Republican hold				

== Secretary of State ==
Missouri Secretary of State election, 2016
Party	Candidate	Votes	%	±%
Republican	Jay Ashcroft	1,591,086	57.62%	+10.21%
Democratic	Robin Smith	1,061,788	38.45%	−10.44%
Libertarian	Chris Morrill	108,568	3.93%	+1.26%
Total votes		2,761,442	100.0%	N/A
Republican gain from Democratic				

== State Treasurer ==
2016 Missouri State Treasurer election
Party	Candidate	Votes	%	±%
Republican	Eric Schmitt	1,545,582	56.45%	+11.02%
Democratic	Judy Baker	1,078,063	39.37%	−11.07%
Libertarian	Sean O'Toole	78,543	2.87%	−1.26%
Green	Carol Hexem	35,923	1.31%	N/A
Independent	Arnie C. AC Dienoff (write-in)	11	0.00%	N/A
Total votes		2,738,122	100.0%	N/A
Republican gain from Democratic				

== Attorney general ==
2016 Missouri Attorney General election
Party	Candidate	Votes	%	±%
Republican	Josh Hawley	1,607,550	58.50%	+17.71%
Democratic	Teresa Hensley	1,140,252	41.50%	−14.31%
Total votes		2,747,802	100.00%	N/A
Republican gain from Democratic				
