= Missouri Press Association =

- Formation: May 16, 1867; 159 years ago
- Headquarters: 802 Locust St. Columbia, Missouri 65201-4888
- President: Beth Durreman
- Website: www.mopress.com

The Missouri Press Association is a 501(c)(6) nonprofit founded on May 16, 1867, by editors and publishers in the U.S. state of Missouri. It was responsible for establishing the Missouri School of Journalism, the first school of journalism in the US, at the University of Missouri.

Mark Maassen has been their executive director since 2015.

== Newspapers in Missouri ==
In an interview for KKFI radio in Kansas City, Maassen praised the Missouri Independent, which is an online-only news organization covering government, politics and policy. Their stories are often republished in local newspapers around the state. They have won multiple awards from the Missouri Press Association. He also noted that Missouri currently has 207 newspapers with at least one in each of Missouri's 114 counties. Other states have news deserts and ghost newspapers; Missouri does not.

After Gannett sold a dozen small community newspapers in Missouri to local owners, Maassen said, "I am bullish on Missouri newspapers, especially the community newspapers." In a discussion of staffing problems with people buying rural newspapers in Missouri, Maassen suggested "a scholarship program that pays students at the Missouri School of Journalism in Columbia, Mo., $10,000 per year for four years, in exchange for a commitment to work at a local newspaper for at least two years after they graduate." The first two such scholarships were announced March 3, 2022.

=== St. Louis Post-Dispatch ===
After Missouri Governor Mike Parson threatened criminal prosecution of St. Louis Post-Dispatch journalist Josh Renaud, Maassen said: "The newspaper and the reporter did nothing wrong. It's not uncommon for elected officials to blame the media" when they expose problems. In this case, Renaud found a security problem with the state's website. He privately reported the problem to state authorities while promising to withhold publishing anything about it until the problem was fixed.

== Awards ==
The Missouri Press Association gives annual awards. The Columbia Missourian won 81 awards from them in 2023 and lesser numbers in previous years. The Missouri Press Association is a member of the Chamber of Commerce of Columbia, Missouri.

== Mark Maassen ==
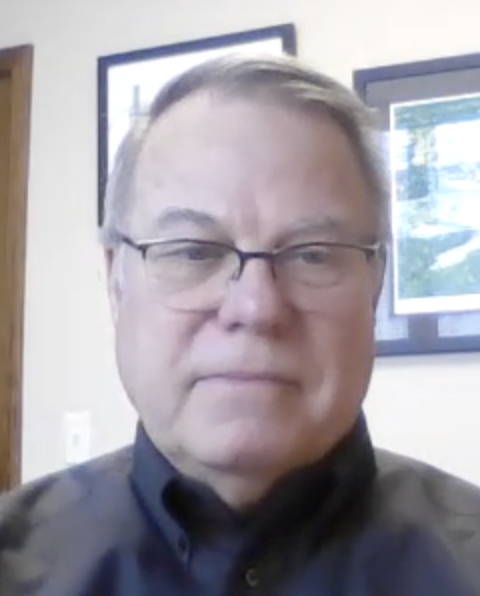
Mark Maassen in 2023

Mark Maassen, executive director of the Missouri Press Association, is a business executive specializing in selling advertising for newspapers and a 1980 Bachelor of Journalism (BJ) graduate from the Missouri School of Journalism. He has been the Executive Director of the association since 2015 after two years as Assistant Executive Director and 33 years in advertising and management with the Kansas City Star. He also served as president of the board of directors of the Missouri Press Association in 2013.

He was elected President of Newspaper Association Managers on August 4, 2023.
