= Gopiganj =

- Town
- Location in Uttar Pradesh, India
- Coordinates: 25°17′N 82°26′E
- Country: India
- State: Uttar Pradesh
- District: Bhadohi
- Founder: Gopi singh Baghel
- Named for: Hand-made carpets

Government
  - Body: Nagar palika parishad Gopiganj

Population (2012)
  - Total: 27,856

Languages
  - Official: Hindi
- Time zone: UTC+5:30 (IST)
- Vehicle registration: UP-66

Gopiganj is a town and a municipal board in Bhadohi district in the Indian state of Uttar Pradesh. At present 'Jitendra kumar ' is chairman of Gopiganj nagar palika parishad. Gopiganj is located beside the river Ganges, almost equidistant from Prayagraj and Varanasi on National Highway 19. Gopiganj is a big market of BHADOHI famous for ornament. Gopiganj is a bus station, from where you can get bus for varanasi and prayagraj. Gopiganj is a famous railway station with name ' GYANPUR ROAD '. You can get a train for Mumbai, New Delhi, Kolkata, Sikandarabad and Ahemadabad from here on time. Many famous educational institutes are here, likewise GULABDHAR MISHRA INTERMEDIATE COLLEGE GOPIGANJ, st. Thomas school Gopiganj, cambridge academy school, jila panchayat balika inter college Gopiganj etc. Nearly 06 km. away from District head quarter Gyanpur.

== Demographics ==
At the 2001 India census, Gopiganj had a population of 17,938 (males 52%, females 48%). Gopiganj had an average literacy rate of 63%, higher than the national average of 59.5%: male literacy was 69% and female literacy 55%. 16% of the population were under 6 years of age.

== Educational institutions ==
- St. Thomas School Gopiganj (Affiliated to ICSE Board New Delhi) (est. 1985),
- CAMBRIDGE ACADEMY SCHOOL, KALIDEVI, GOPIGANJ
- Kashinaresh Postgraduate College (Gyanpur),
- D.W. Punj Model School (Sitamarhi)
- Lakshay Computer Institute padav Gopiganj
- Gurukulam Shikshan Sansthan (Jakhaw)
- GULABDHAR MISHRA INTERMEDIATE COLLEGE GOPIGANJ(PADAV)
