= J. B. Bernstein =

American sports agent

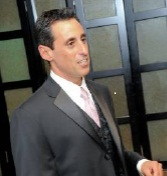
- J.B. Bernstein in 2010
- Born: February 5, 1968 (age 58); New York City, New York
- Occupations: Sports agent, entrepreneur
- Known for: Representing Barry Bonds and Barry Sanders
- Spouse: Brenda Paauwe-Navori
- Website: AccessGroupOfMiami.com, SevenFiguresManagement.com

J. B. Bernstein (born February 5, 1968) is the CEO of Access Group, an athlete management firm and chief marketing officer of Seven Figures Management, a sports marketing and athlete representation firm.

Bernstein created The Million Dollar Arm contest in India, which yielded the first two Indian men (Rinku Singh and Dinesh Patel) to ever sign pro sports contracts in the US (with the Pittsburgh Pirates).

Bernstein received his bachelor's degree in political economics in 1990 from the University of Massachusetts Amherst, obtaining his MBA at The London School of Economics. Bernstein started his career in brand management at Grey Advertising working exclusively with Procter & Gamble accounts.

Bernstein started working in the sports industry during the early years of The Upper Deck Company and as Director of Development for their memorabilia division Upper Deck Authenticated.

Bernstein's services were retained by Major League Soccer from 1995 to 1997, where he acted as their head of licensing and created the league's merchandise program. MLS secured over 50 national partners and reached $50 million in MLS-licensed sales in just its second season.

Bernstein became a partner in Pro Access Group in 1997 and created a platform of marketing campaigns to mark significant achievements in sports history. He went on to represent several, including Barry Sanders, Emmitt Smith, and Barry Bonds.

Bernstein's involvement with Singh and Patel is the basis for the film Million Dollar Arm. Bernstein is portrayed by Jon Hamm.

== Reality contest ==
Bernstein set up an Indian reality TV contest called The Million Dollar Arm which was aired on Zee Sports (Now, TEN Action). The winner received a prize of $100,000 with an opportunity to win $1 million United States dollars in a bonus round afterward. Additionally, the winner received formal training in the United States with the possibility of being selected as a pitcher for a Major League Baseball team. The two 2008 winners, Rinku Singh and Dinesh Patel, were signed to the Pittsburgh Pirates. While Patel returned to India, and hopes to play for the India men's national baseball team, Singh has remained in the United States.
