= Dinesh Patel =

Indian baseball pitcher (born 1989)

- Pitcher
- Born: 8 May 1989 (age 37); Lucknow, Uttar Pradesh, India
- Bats: Right Throws: Right

MILB statistics
- Win–loss record: 1–0
- ERA: 5.27
- Strikeouts: 11
- Stats at Baseball Reference

Teams
- Gulf Coast League Pirates (2009–2010)

Dinesh Kumar Patel (born 8 May 1989) is an Indian right-handed baseball pitcher who played in the Pittsburgh Pirates organization. Along with Rinku Singh, he was the first Indian player ever to sign a contract with a major American baseball team. Neither Patel nor Singh had ever thrown a baseball before beating over 37,000 competitors in The Million Dollar Arm, an Indian reality television show designed to find new baseball talent.

== Early life ==
Due to extreme poverty and inability to meet the expenses of raising a child, Patel's parents had left him to be raised by his maternal grandmother in Khanpur, a village of Varanasi district. At the age of 14, he started visiting Sampurnanand Stadium in Sigra where he met athletes and trained himself to play field hockey. In 2004, he was selected for a regional sports hostel in Lucknow. Patel won a gold medal in field hockey at the National School Games at Pune in 2006.

He is an alumnus of the Guru Gobind Singh Sports College, Lucknow.

== Professional baseball career ==
Patel, along with Singh, tried out in front of scouts from 20 Major League Baseball teams in November 2008, reaching 90 miles per hour throwing a baseball. Reports from Pittsburgh Pirates scouts Joe Ferrone and Sean Campbell led to general manager Neal Huntington signing both to contracts with the organization. With the deal, the pair became the first Indians to sign American major league baseball contracts. The total signing bonus for the two was $8,000. After training, the two returned to visit their families in India before entering Pirates training camp in Bradenton, Florida.

Patel, along with Singh, played for the Pirates' Gulf Coast League team. He had a successful, yet brief, 2009 season for the Pirates, picking up a victory on 13 August (exactly one month after his countryman Singh got his first, and only, win of the year) and finishing with a 1–0 record and 1.42 earned run average, allowing two runs (one earned) on six hits and no walks in 6 1/3 innings, holding opposing batters to a .192 batting average in six relief appearances. Patel's 2010 season was less successful, with an 8.59 earned run average in 7 1/3 innings, over nine games; he was released on November 24, 2010. He played errorless defense over the two seasons.

== Later years ==
Patel returned home to finish school. He also taught baseball in Delhi, and in 2011 he helped his village boys prepare for the second season of the Million Dollar Arm talent hunt for about two months, without charge. After his return, Patel also practiced the javelin throw. Patel participated at the national athletics championship in Kolkata in 2011 and the Federation Cup athletics championship in April 2012. In 2012, Patel said,

"My family's economical and emotional conditions have improved. I could renovate the home in the village and my sister's wedding was arranged with the money that I sent home. My family gathered self esteem and respect in society. It is always good to see your near and dear ones happy."

== Film ==
Patel and Singh's story is the basis for the Walt Disney Pictures sports film Million Dollar Arm, in which Patel is portrayed by Madhur Mittal.

== See also ==
- List of people from Uttar Pradesh
- List of people from Lucknow
