= Missouri's 3rd Senate district =

American legislative district

Missouri's 3rd State Senate district
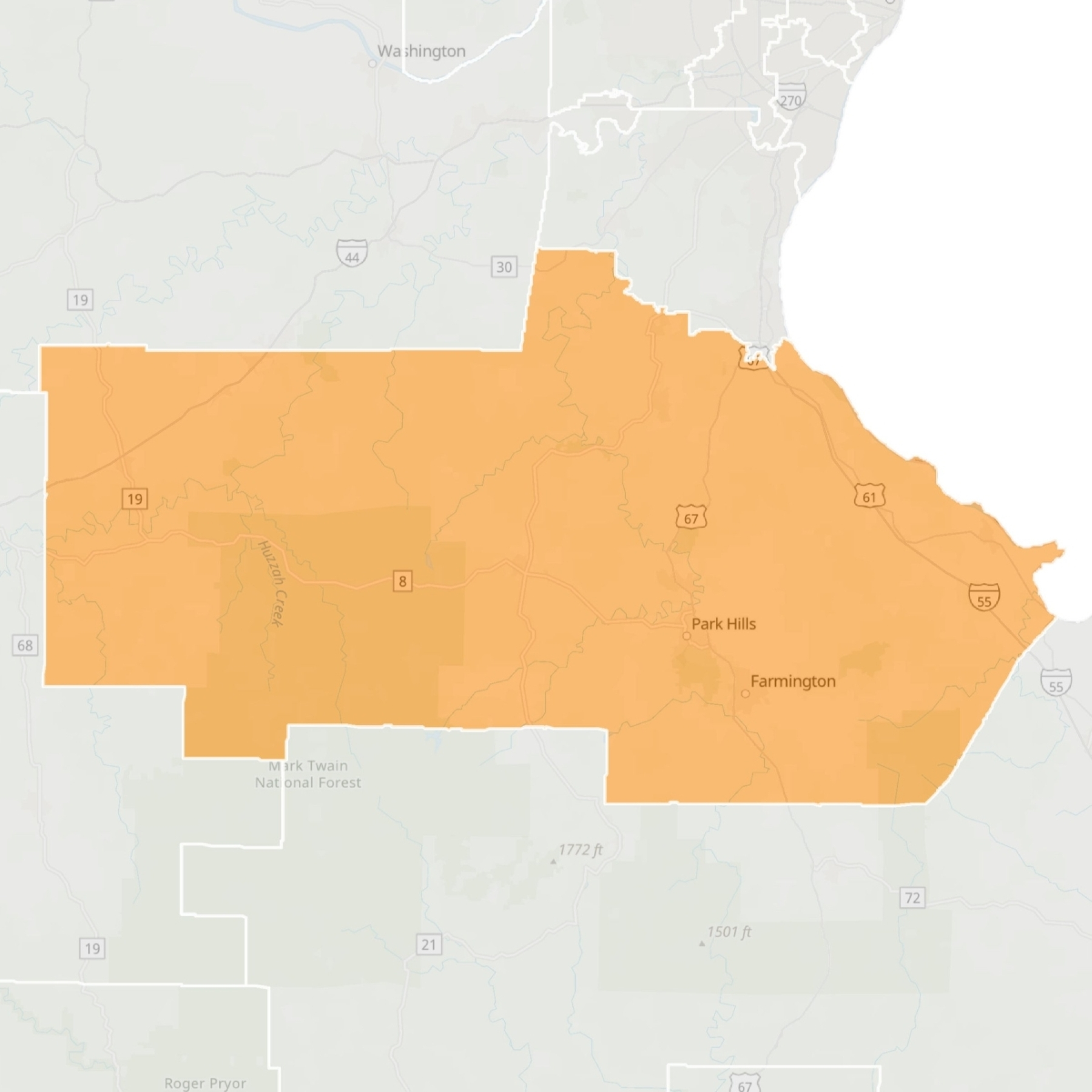
Senator
Mike Henderson; R–Desloge
- Demographics: 91% White; 2% Black; 2% Hispanic; 4% Multiracial
- Population (2023): 178,774

Missouri's 3rd Senatorial District is one of 34 districts in the Missouri Senate. The district has been represented by Republican Mike Henderson since 2025.

== Geography ==
The district includes southwestern portions of the St. Louis metropolitan area and includes Crawford, St. Francois, Ste. Genevieve, Washington, and southern Jefferson counties. Major municipalities in the district include Bloomsdale, Bonne Terre, Cuba, De Soto, Farmington, and Park Hills. The district also includes a portion of Mark Twain National Forest.

== Election results (1996–2024) ==
=== 1996 ===
Missouri's 3rd Senatorial District election (1996)
Party	Candidate	Votes	%
Democratic	John E. Scott	36,939	65.42
Republican	Leonard F. Arons	17,970	31.83
Constitution	Ron Levy	1,555	2.75
Total votes		56,464	100.00

=== 2000 ===
Missouri's 3rd Senatorial District election (2000)
Party	Candidate	Votes	%
Democratic	John E. Scott (incumbent)	36,728	64.02
Republican	Leonard F. Arons	17,354	30.25
Green	Mary A. Auer	3,287	5.73
Total votes		57,369	100.00
Democratic hold			

=== 2001 ===
Missouri's 3rd Senatorial District special election (2001)
Party	Candidate	Votes	%
Democratic	Harry Kennedy	7,707	68.04
Republican	Matt Hoffman	3,283	28.98
Green	Robert H. McFall	337	2.98
Total votes		11,327	100.00
Democratic hold			

=== 2004 ===
Missouri's 3rd Senatorial District election (2004)
Party	Candidate	Votes	%
Republican	Kevin Engler	34,767	51.04
Democratic	Dan Ward	33,348	48.96
Total votes		68,115	100.00
Republican gain from Democratic			

=== 2008 ===
Missouri's 3rd Senatorial District election (2008)
Party	Candidate	Votes	%
Republican	Kevin Engler (incumbent)	42,551	58.72
Democratic	Dennis Riche	29,917	41.28
Total votes		72,468	100.00
Republican hold			

=== 2012 ===
Missouri's 3rd Senatorial District election (2012)
Party	Candidate	Votes	%
Republican	Gary Romine	35,384	53.84
Democratic	Joseph Fallert, Jr	30,335	46.16
Total votes		65,719	100.00
Republican hold			

=== 2016 ===
Missouri's 3rd Senatorial District election (2016)
Party	Candidate	Votes	%
Republican	Gary Romine (incumbent)	54,414	81.25
Green	Edward R. Weissler	12,555	18.75
Total votes		66,969	100.00
Republican hold			

=== 2020 ===
Missouri's 3rd Senatorial District election (2020)
Party	Candidate	Votes	%
Republican	Elaine F. Gannon	65,686	100.00
Total votes		65,686	100.00
Republican hold			

=== 2024 ===
Missouri's 3rd Senatorial District election (2024)
Party	Candidate	Votes	%
Republican	Mike Henderson	60,548	75.86
Democratic	Doug Halbert	19,273	24.15
Total votes		79,821	100.00
Republican hold			

== Statewide election results ==
Year	Office	Results
2008	President	McCain 49.4 – 48.4%
2012	President	Romney 59.0 – 41.0%
2016	President	Trump 71.0 – 24.8%
2016	Senate	Blunt 53.7 – 40.8%
2016	Governor	Greitens 56.6 – 38.9%
2018	Senate	Hawley 59.6 – 36.5%
2020	President	Trump 74.1 – 24.5%
2020	Governor	Parson 70.4 – 27.0%
