= 2022 United States Senate election in Missouri =

- November 8, 2022
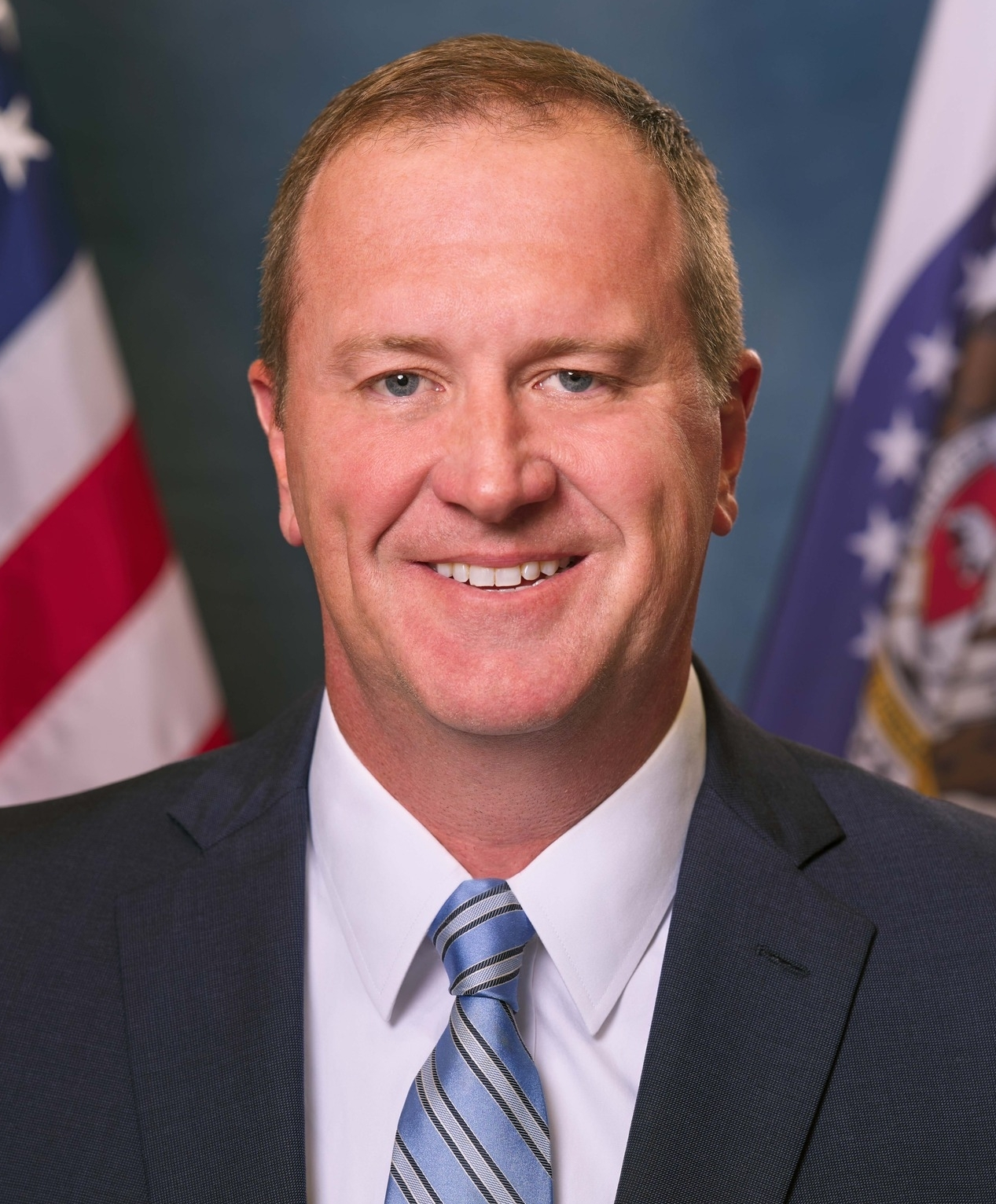

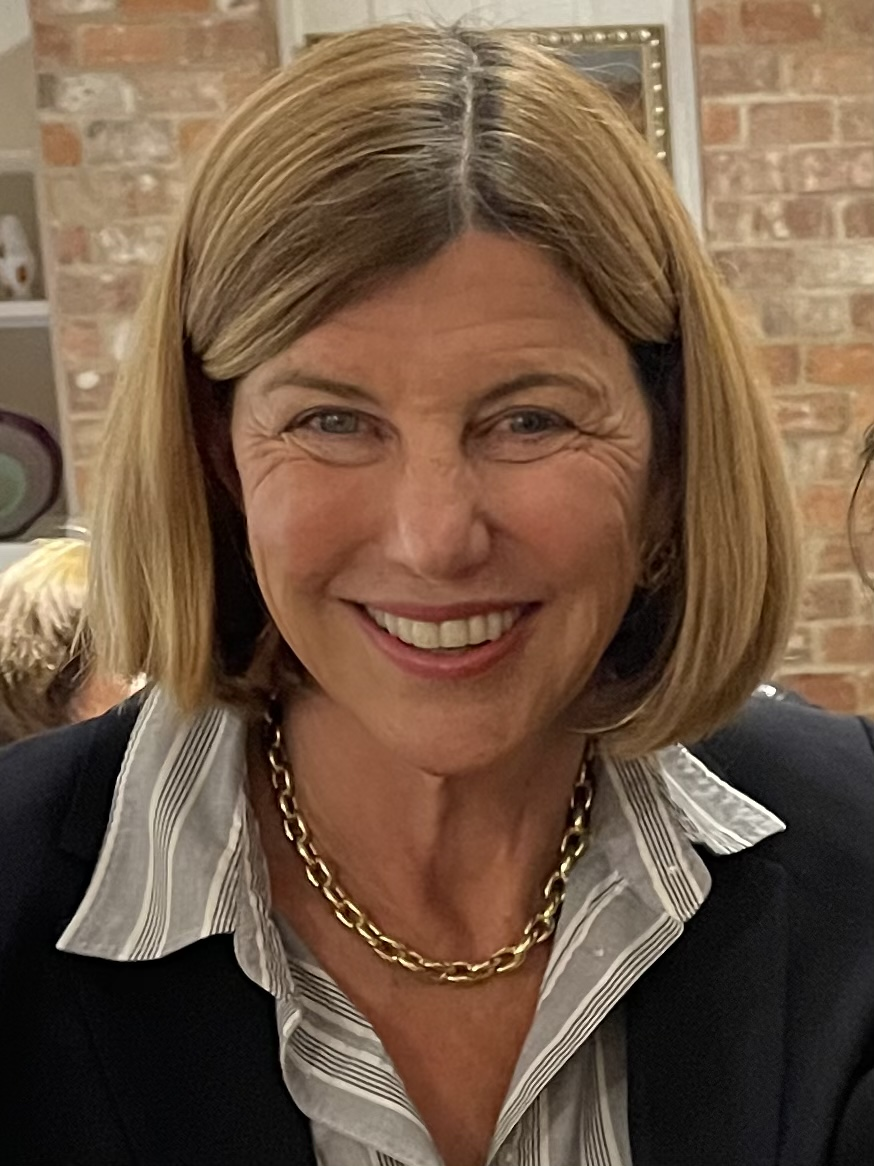
Nominee	Eric Schmitt	Trudy Busch Valentine
Party	Republican	Democratic
Popular vote	1,146,966	872,694
Percentage	55.43%	42.18%
- Schmitt: 40–50% 50–60% 60–70% 70–80% 80–90% Busch Valentine: 50–60% 60–70% 70–80% 80–90%
U.S. senator before election
Roy Blunt
Republican
Elected U.S. Senator
Eric Schmitt
Republican

The 2022 United States Senate election in Missouri was held on November 8, 2022, concurrently with elections for all other Class 3 U.S. senators and elections for the U.S. House of Representatives, to select a member of the United States Senate to represent the state of Missouri. Incumbent Senator Roy Blunt, a Republican, did not seek a third term in office. Republican Missouri Attorney General Eric Schmitt won the open seat, defeating Democrat Trudy Busch Valentine.

== Republican primary ==
In March 2021, incumbent Republican Senator Roy Blunt announced that he would not seek reelection in 2022.

Republican candidates for Blunt's Senate seat included former Gov. Eric Greitens, U.S. Rep. Vicky Hartzler, U.S. Rep. Billy Long, and Missouri Attorney General Eric Schmitt.

Schmitt's candidacy was backed by Missouri mega-donor Rex Sinquefield. In the speech announcing his candidacy, Schmitt tied himself to Donald Trump and spoke against "the radical left". He pledged to vote against Mitch McConnell for the Senate Republican party leadership position.

In February 2022, Hartzler's campaign released a 30-second ad criticizing Lia Thomas, a transgender swimmer on the University of Pennsylvania women's team. In the ad, Hartzler said, "Women's sports are for women, not men pretending to be women", adding that, as Missouri's senator, she would not "look away while woke liberals destroy women's sports."

U.S. Sen. Josh Hawley endorsed Hartzler in February 2022. On July 8, 2022, Donald Trump refused to endorse Hartzler, saying, "I don't think she has what it takes to take on the Radical Left Democrats."

Greitens was endorsed by former New York City mayor Rudy Giuliani, former U.S. Secretary of the Interior Ryan Zinke, and Fox News personality Kimberly Guilfoyle, the latter joining his campaign as a national chair.

Many Republican officials, strategists, and donors maneuvered to stymie Greitens's attempted comeback, believing that the scandal surrounding his resignation as governor, his extramarital affair, and the sexual assault accusation against him would make him a weak general election candidate and lead to the loss of the Senate seat to a Democrat. Notable Republican opponents of Greitens's candidacy included Karl Rove, Johnny DeStefano, and Senator Rick Scott, the chairman of the National Republican Senatorial Committee. After Greitens's ex-wife filed an affidavit against him in March 2022 accusing him of physical abuse, Senator Josh Hawley (who had endorsed Vicky Hartzler the previous month) called upon Greitens to drop out.

Republican megadonor Richard Uihlein funded a pro-Greitens super PAC ("Team PAC"), contributing $2.5 million to it. Other Republican megadonors, including Rex Sinquefield and August Busch, aligned against Greitens. A Republican-funded anti-Greitens super PAC ("Show Me Values PAC") was created in June 2022 and ran $6.2 million in ads through late July 2022.

Republican officials, including Rick Scott, waged a campaign to persuade Donald Trump not to endorse Greitens. On the eve of the primary election, Trump issued a statement endorsing "ERIC" in the primary, leaving it unclear which "Eric" he was endorsing.

In the primary election, Schmitt prevailed with 45.7% of the vote; Hartzler received 22.1%, Greitens 18.9%, and Long 5%.

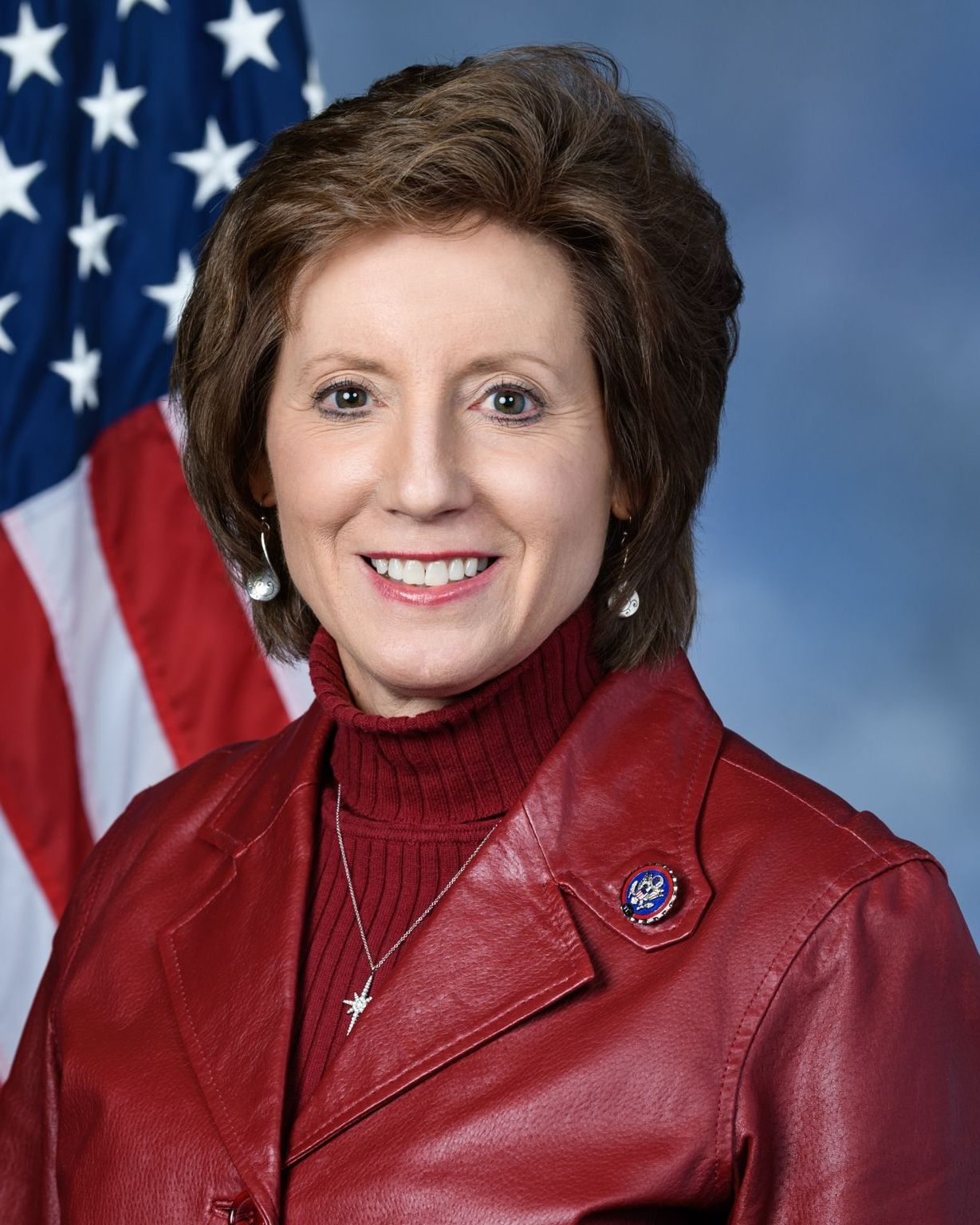
U.S. Representative Vicky Hartzler was endorsed by Missouri Senator Josh Hawley and finished second.

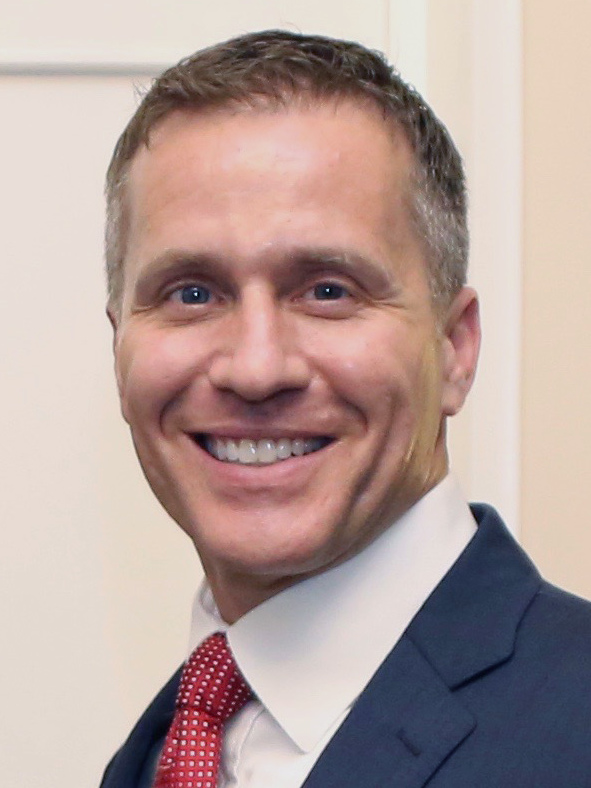
Former governor Eric Greitens attempted to restart his political career, but finished third.

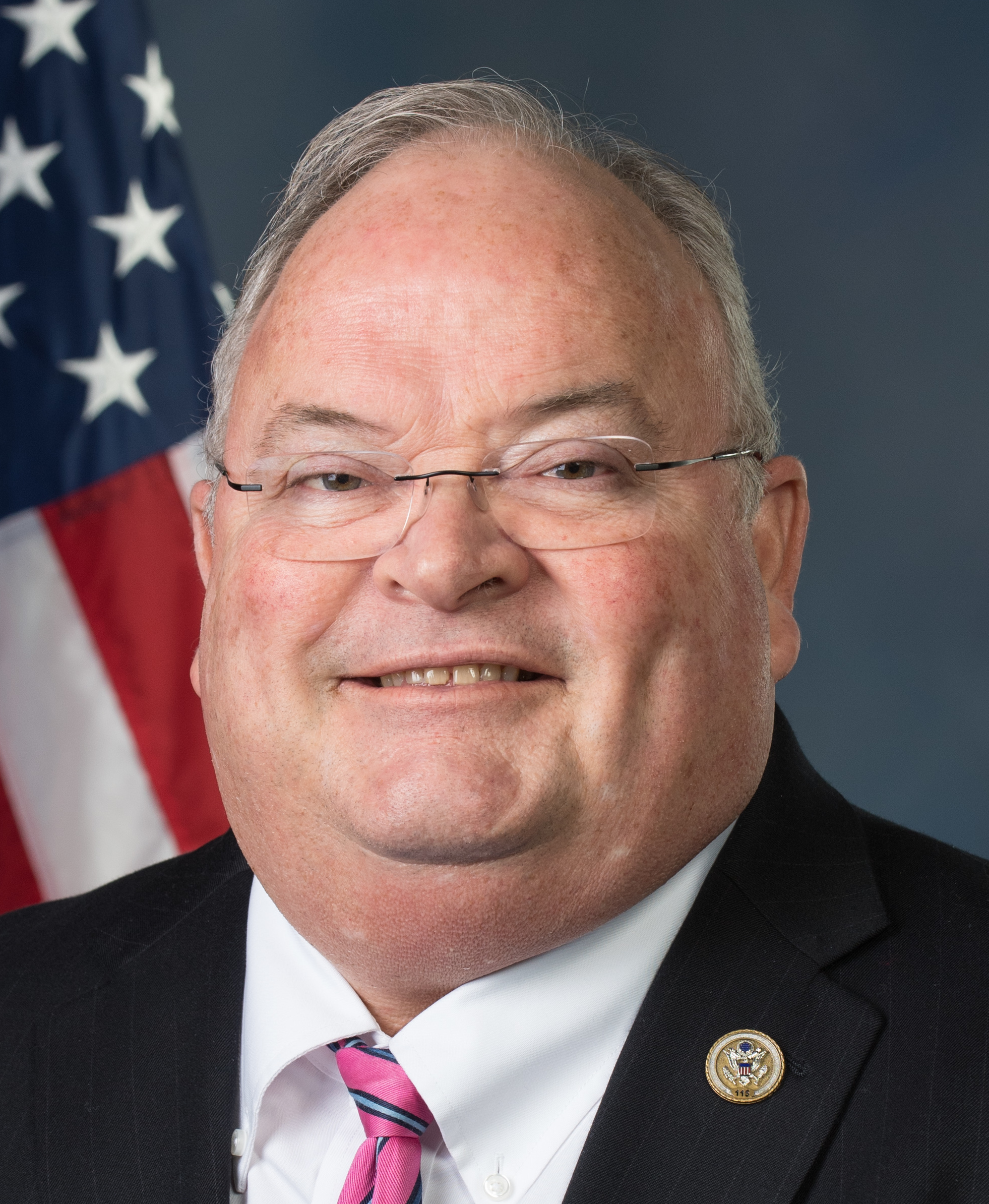
U.S. Representative Billy Long failed to gain traction, and finished a distant fourth.

=== Candidates ===
==== Nominee ====
- Eric Schmitt, Missouri attorney general (2019–2023) and former Missouri state treasurer (2017–2019)

==== Eliminated in primary ====
- Robert Allen
- Russel Pealer Breyfogle Jr., retired social worker
- Dennis Lee Chilton, 2018 Missouri House of Representatives candidate
- C. W. Gardner, doorman and former broadcaster
- Eric Greitens, former governor of Missouri (2017–2018)
- Vicky Hartzler, U.S. representative from Missouri's 4th congressional district (2011–2023)
- Rickey Joiner, barber and business owner
- Patrick A. Lewis, union construction laborer
- Billy Long, U.S. representative from Missouri's 7th congressional district (2011–2023)
- Darrell Leon McClanahan III, political activist, KKK member
- Mark McCloskey, attorney and 2020 Republican National Convention speaker known for his involvement in the St. Louis gun-toting controversy
- Eric McElroy, comedian and U.S. Navy veteran
- Bernie Mowinsk, retired U.S. Air Force sergeant and perennial candidate
- Robert Olson
- Deshon Porter, host of The Big D Zone
- Dave Schatz, president pro tempore of the Missouri Senate (2019–2023), state senator (2015–2023)
- Kevin C. Schepers
- Dave Sims, Monett public works employee and former radio host
- Hartford Tunnell, college professor
- Curtis D. Vaughn, valet parking attendant and liquor salesman

==== Missed filing deadline ====
- John Brinkmann, insurance agency owner and financial consultant
- Rik Combs, retired U.S. Air Force officer and Libertarian nominee for governor of Missouri in 2020
- Jeremy Gundel, farmer and write-in candidate for lieutenant governor of Missouri in 2020

==== Withdrawn ====
- Roy Blunt, incumbent U.S. senator (2011–2023) and chair of the Senate Republican Policy Committee (2019–2023)
- Dan McQueen, former mayor of Corpus Christi, Texas (2016–2017) (ran for the U.S. House)

==== Declined ====
- Jay Ashcroft, Missouri secretary of state (2017–present)
- Scott Fitzpatrick, Missouri state treasurer (2019–2023) (ran for state auditor)
- Timothy A. Garrison, former U.S. attorney for the Western District of Missouri (2018–2021)
- Mike Kehoe, lieutenant governor of Missouri (2018–present) (ran for governor)
- Peter Kinder, former lieutenant governor of Missouri (2005–2017)
- Blaine Luetkemeyer, U.S. representative from Missouri's 3rd congressional district (2013–present) and Missouri's 9th congressional district (2009–2013) (ran for re-election)
- Mike Parson, governor of Missouri (2018–present)
- Jason Smith, U.S. representative from Missouri's 8th congressional district (2013–present) (ran for re-election)
- Kathy Swan, former state representative (2012–2021)
- Ann Wagner, U.S. representative from Missouri's 2nd congressional district (2013–present) (ran for re-election)

=== Endorsements ===
The day before the primary, former president Donald Trump released a statement endorsing "ERIC". There were three candidates with the first name Eric running in the Republican primary: Eric Greitens, Eric McElroy, and Eric Schmitt. Trump's statement did not offer any clarification on whether this was an endorsement for one or multiple candidates, and when reached for comment by NBC News, Trump's office declined to clarify the endorsement.

Eric Greitens

Federal officials

- Joseph diGenova, U.S. attorney for the District of Columbia (1983–1988), attorney to President Donald Trump
- Michael Flynn, U.S. national security advisor (2017) (Democratic)
- Sebastian Gorka, deputy assistant to the president (2017)
- Donald Trump, 45th and 47th president of the United States (2017–2021, 2025–present) (co-endorsement with Schmitt)
- Ryan Zinke, U.S. secretary of the interior (2017–2019) and U.S. representative from Montana's at-large congressional district (2015–2017)

Individuals

- Rudy Giuliani, mayor of New York City (1994–2001)
- Kimberly Guilfoyle, television news personality
- Bernard Marcus, billionaire and co-founder of The Home Depot
- Victoria Toensing, attorney to President Donald Trump
- Richard Uihlein, billionaire and co-founder of Uline

Organizations

- New York Young Republican Club
Vicky Hartzler

Federal officials

- Michele Bachmann, U.S. representative for Minnesota's 6th congressional district (2007–2015) and candidate for president in 2012
- Kit Bond, U.S. senator from Missouri (1987–2011)
- Deb Fischer, U.S. senator from Nebraska (2013–present)
- Josh Hawley, U.S. senator from Missouri (2019–present)
- Roger Marshall, U.S. senator from Kansas (2021–present)
- Tony Perkins, president of the Family Research Council (2003–present), chair of the United States Commission on International Religious Freedom (2019–2020), and Louisiana state representative (1996–2004)

Individuals

- Eric Metaxas, Christian author and conservative radio host
- Penny Nance, president of Concerned Women for America

Organizations

- Maggie's List
- Missouri Cattlemen's Association
- Missouri Farm Bureau
- Susan B. Anthony List
Eric Schmitt

Federal officials

- Ted Cruz, U.S. senator from Texas (2013–present) and candidate for president in 2016
- Mike Lee, U.S. senator from Utah (2011–present)
- Robert C. O'Brien, U.S. national security advisor (2019–2021) and Special Envoy for Hostage Affairs (2019–2019)
- Sarah Huckabee Sanders, White House press secretary (2017–2019) and governor of Arkansas (2023-present)
- Donald Trump, 45th and 47th president of the United States (2017–2021, 2025–present) (co-endorsement with Greitens)
- Matthew Whitaker, acting U.S. attorney general (2018–2019), U.S. attorney for the Southern District of Iowa (2004–2009), nominee for Iowa state treasurer in 2002, and candidate for U.S. Senate in 2014

State officials

- Winsome Sears, lieutenant governor of Virginia (2022–present)

State legislators

- Cyndi Buchheit-Courtway, state representative for Missouri's 115th district (2021–present)
- Cindy O'Laughlin, state senator for Missouri's 18th district (2018–present)

Individuals

- Dana Loesch, radio and TV host
- Rex Sinquefield, philanthropist and president of the Show-Me Institute

Organizations

- Americans for Prosperity Action
- Gun Owners of America
- Missouri Fraternal Order of Police
- Senate Conservatives Fund
- Tea Party Express

=== Debates ===
Date	Host	Moderator	Link(s)	Participants					
Key: P Participant A Absent N Non-invitee I Invitee W Withdrawn									
Key: P Participant A Absent N Non-invitee I Invitee W Withdrawn				Eric Greitens	Vicky Hartzler	Billy Long	Mark McCloskey	Dave Schatz	Eric Schmitt
May 31, 2022	Greene County Republicans	Ginger Gooch; Darrell Moore		A	A	P	P	P	A

=== Polling ===
Graphical summary

Source of poll aggregation	Dates administered	Dates updated	Eric Greitens	Vicky Hartzler	Billy Long	Mark McCloskey	Dave Schatz	Eric Schmitt	Other (Note: Calculated by taking the difference of 100% and all other candidates combined.)	Margin
Real Clear Politics	July 21 – 24, 2022	July 26, 2022	19.0%	24.5%	7.0%	5.0%	2.5%	33.0%	9.0%	Schmitt +8.5

Poll source	Date(s) administered	Sample size (Note: Key: A – all adults RV – registered voters LV – likely voters V – unclear)	Margin of error	Eric Greitens	Vicky Hartzler	Billy Long	Mark McCloskey	Dave Schatz	Eric Schmitt	Other	Undecided
The Trafalgar Group (R)	July 31 – August 1, 2022	1,078 (LV)	± 2.9%	21%	18%	5%	5%	3%	34%	–	15%
Remington Research (R)/Missouri Scout (Note: Non-partisan poll conducted for the local non-partisan tipsheet Missouri Scout)	July 27–28, 2022	818 (LV)	± 3.4%	18%	22%	6%	5%	5%	34%	2%	8%
co/efficient (R) (Note: Poll conducted for Missouri First Action, which supports Greitens)	July 27, 2022	891 (LV)	± 3.3%	17%	16%	–	–	–	28%	–	–
SurveyUSA	July 24–27, 2022	787 (LV)	± 4.2%	20%	13%	8%	4%	3%	28%	4%	21%
Emerson College	July 21–23, 2022	1,000 (LV)	± 3.0%	16%	21%	5%	4%	2%	33%	1% (Note: Gardner and Tunnell with 1%; Allen, Breyfogle, Joiner, Lewis, McClanahan, Mowinski, Olson, Porter, and Sims with 0%)	17%
Remington Research (R)/Missouri Scout	July 23–24, 2022	802 (LV)	± 3.4%	18%	25%	8%	4%	3%	32%	–	10%
The Trafalgar Group (R)	July 22–24, 2022	1,059 (LV)	± 2.9%	20%	24%	7%	5%	2%	27%	–	16%
The Tarrance Group (R) (Note: This poll was sponsored by Show Me Values PAC, which opposes Greitens)	July 5–7, 2022	600 (LV)	± 4.0%	16%	24%	6%	4%	4%	28%	–	18%
The Trafalgar Group (R)	June 28–30, 2022	1,072 (LV)	± 2.9%	24%	24%	6%	3%	4%	23%	–	17%
Remington Research (R)/Missouri Scout	June 22–23, 2022	911 (LV)	± 3.1%	20%	19%	8%	5%	2%	25%	–	21%
Emerson College	June 2–5, 2022	1,000 (LV)	± 3.0%	26%	16%	8%	4%	0%	20%	1% (Note: McElroy, Joiner, and Vaughn with 0%)	27%
The Trafalgar Group (R)	May 16–18, 2022	1,065 (LV)	± 2.9%	26%	23%	9%	3%	3%	19%	–	17%
SurveyUSA	May 11–15, 2022	642 (LV)	± 5.0%	26%	11%	7%	2%	2%	17%	7% (Note: Allen, Joiner, Lewis, McClanahan, McElroy, Schepers, and Sims with 1%; Breyfogle, Chilton, Gardner, Mowinski, Olson, Porter, Tunnell, and Vaughn with 0%)	28%
Remington Research (R) (Note: Poll conducted for an undisclosed private client)	May 11–12, 2022	945 (LV)	± 3.0%	21%	23%	–	–	–	29%	10%	17%
co/efficient (R) (Note: Poll conducted for Eric Greitens's campaign)	May 2–4, 2022	806 (LV)	± 3.5%	26%	19%	7%	5%	2%	14%	–	27%
NMB Research (R) (Note: Poll conducted for Protect Missouri Values PAC, which supports Schmitt)	April 6–7, 2022	500 (LV)	± 4.4%	23%	20%	7%	3%	2%	25%	20%	–
OnMessage Inc. (R) (Note: Poll conducted for Vicky Hartzler's campaign)	April 4–6, 2022	600 (LV)	± 4.0%	22%	23%	11%	5%	2%	16%	–	21%
The Trafalgar Group (R)	March 24–29, 2022	1,079 (LV)	± 3.0%	24%	25%	8%	2%	3%	22%	–	16%
Remington Research (R)/Missouri Scout	March 22–23, 2022	941 (LV)	± 3.1%	21%	19%	9%	5%	3%	24%	–	19%
The Trafalgar Group (R)	February 22–24, 2022	1,026 (LV)	± 3.0%	31%	17%	6%	5%	2%	23%	3%	15%
Remington Research (R)/Missouri Scout	February 16–17, 2022	917 (LV)	± 3.1%	25%	18%	8%	5%	2%	22%	–	20%
Remington Research (R)/Missouri Scout	January 26–27, 2022	902 (LV)	± 3.1%	28%	19%	7%	5%	1%	23%	–	17%
OnMessage Inc. (R)	January 2022	– (LV)	–	30%	16%	9%	6%	1%	16%	–	23%
CMA Strategies (R) (Note: Poll conducted for the Missouri Chamber Political Institute)	January 2022	400 (LV)	± 5.0%	27%	12%	6%	4%	1%	15%	–	36%
Remington Research (R)/Missouri Scout	December 1–2, 2021	744 (LV)	± 3.4%	27%	16%	7%	4%	3%	24%	–	19%
NMB Research (R)	December 2021	– (LV)	–	34%	–	–	–	–	17%	49%	–
Remington Research (R)/Missouri Scout	October 20–21, 2021	806 (LV)	± 3.2%	27%	19%	8%	4%	–	25%	–	17%
Fabrizio Lee (R)	October 3–5, 2021	400 (LV)	± 4.9%	36%	10%	6%	4%	–	17%	1% (Note: Deets with 1%; Brinkmann and Porter with 0%)	25%
Remington Research (R)/Missouri Scout	September 8–9, 2021	847 (LV)	± 3.2%	27%	17%	8%	5%	–	28%	–	15%
Remington Research (R)/Missouri Scout	August 4–5, 2021	911 (LV)	± 3.0%	27%	13%	12%	9%	–	24%	–	15%
Remington Research (R)/Missouri Scout	June 9–10, 2021	1,011 (LV)	± 3.0%	34%	14%	–	7%	–	25%	–	20%
Remington Research (R)/Missouri Scout	March 24–25, 2021	1,041 (LV)	± 3.0%	36%	–	14%	–	–	30%	–	20%
Remington Research (R)/Missouri Scout	March 24–25, 2021	1,041 (LV)	± 3.0%	40%	–	–	–	–	39%	–	21%

Hypothetical polling

Poll source	Date(s) administered	Sample size	Margin of error	Roy Blunt	John Brunner	Eric Greitens	Vicky Hartzler	Billy Long	Eric Schmitt	Jason Smith	Ann Wagner	Undecided
Remington Research (R)/Missouri Scout	March 24–25, 2021	1,041 (LV)	± 3.0%	–	2%	31%	8%	6%	18%	9%	12%	14%
Remington Research (R)/Missouri Scout	March 24–25, 2021	1,041 (LV)	± 3.0%	–	10%	38%	–	–	30%	–	–	22%
Remington Research (R)/Missouri Scout	March 24–25, 2021	1,041 (LV)	± 3.0%	–	–	36%	–	–	29%	16%	–	19%
Remington Research (R)/Missouri Scout	March 24–25, 2021	1,041 (LV)	± 3.0%	–	–	38%	–	–	26%	–	18%	18%
Fabrizio, Lee & Associates (R)	March 23–25, 2021	400 (LV)	± 4.9%	–	–	48%	–	–	11%	7%	9%	26%
Remington Research (R)/Missouri Scout	December 2–3, 2020	840 (LV)	± 3.4%	43%	–	32%	–	–	–	–	–	25%

=== Results ===
Results by county: Schmitt: 30–40%; 40–50%; 50–60%; Hartzler: 30–40%; 40–50%; Greitens: 40–50%

Republican primary results
Party	Candidate	Votes	%
Republican	Eric Schmitt	299,282	45.6
Republican	Vicky Hartzler	144,903	22.1
Republican	Eric Greitens	124,155	18.9
Republican	Billy Long	32,603	5.0
Republican	Mark McCloskey	19,540	3.0
Republican	Dave Schatz	7,509	1.1
Republican	Patrick A. Lewis	6,085	0.9
Republican	Curtis D. Vaughn	3,451	0.5
Republican	Eric McElroy	2,805	0.4
Republican	Robert Allen	2,111	0.3
Republican	C. W. Gardner	2,044	0.3
Republican	Dave Sims	1,949	0.3
Republican	Bernie Mowinski	1,602	0.2
Republican	Deshon Porter	1,574	0.2
Republican	Darrell Leon McClanahan III	1,139	0.2
Republican	Rickey Joiner	1,084	0.2
Republican	Robert Olson	1,081	0.2
Republican	Dennis Lee Chilton	755	0.1
Republican	Russel Pealer Breyfogle Jr.	685	0.1
Republican	Kevin C. Schepers	681	0.1
Republican	Hartford Tunnell	637	0.1
Total votes		655,675	100.0

== Democratic primary ==
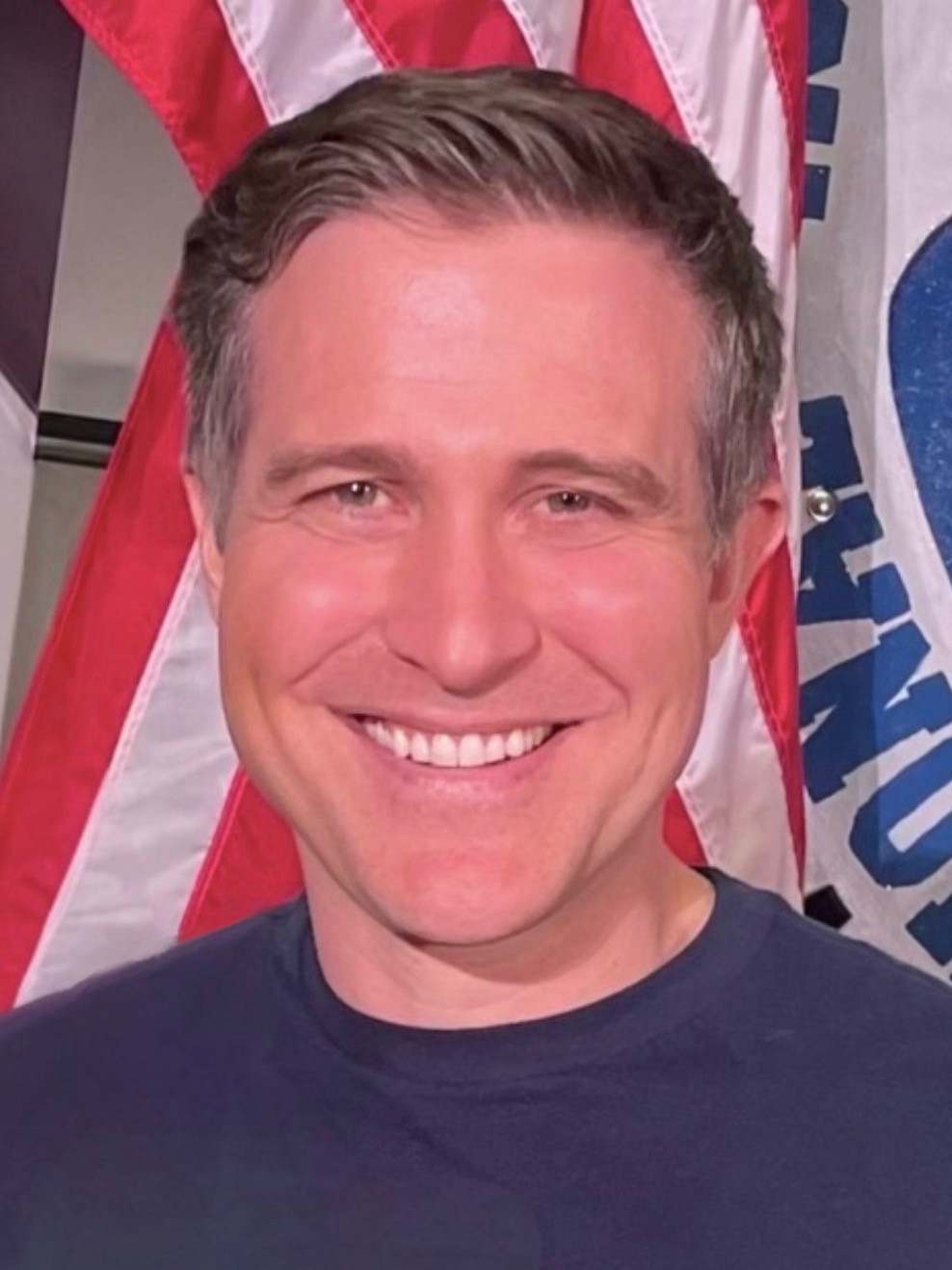
AELP national security director Lucas Kunce led in fundraising, but finished second.

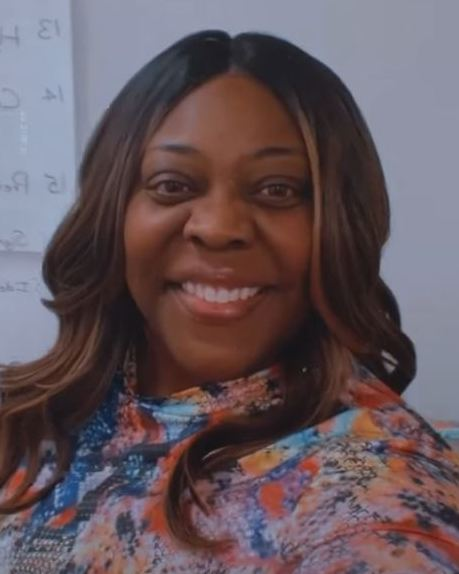
College professor Gena Ross, a previous nominee for U.S. House, finished fifth.

As the Democratic primary season progressed, three main contenders emerged: Lucas Kunce, director of national security at the American Economic Liberties Project; Spencer Toder, a businessman; and Trudy Busch Valentine, heiress of the Anheuser-Busch brewing company. Kunce and Toder both campaigned as anti-establishment populists, whereas Valentine campaigned in a staid manner with few public appearances.

=== Candidates ===
==== Nominee ====
- Trudy Busch Valentine, retired nurse, businesswoman, activist, and daughter of beer magnate August Busch Jr.

==== Eliminated in primary ====
- Ron Harris, truck driver, U.S. Air Force veteran, and perennial candidate
- Jewel Kelly, real estate agent and U.S. Air Force veteran
- Pat Kelly, environmental engineer and patent attorney
- Lucas Kunce, national security director of the American Economic Liberties Project and retired U.S. Marine Corps officer
- Lewis Rolen, medical operational assistant
- Gena Ross, college professor and nominee for Missouri's 6th congressional district in 2020
- Josh Shipp, physical therapy technician and candidate for Missouri's 1st congressional district in 2018
- Clay Taylor
- Spencer Toder, entrepreneur
- Carla Coffee Wright, businesswoman, actress, and perennial candidate

==== Withdrew ====
- Tim Shepard, tech entrepreneur (endorsed Valentine)
- Scott Sifton, former state senator (2013–2021) (endorsed Valentine)

==== Declined ====
- Nicole Galloway, incumbent state auditor of Missouri and nominee for governor of Missouri in 2020
- Jason Kander, former Secretary of state of Missouri (2013–17) and nominee for U.S. Senate in 2016
- Quinton Lucas, mayor of Kansas City (2019–present) (ran for re-election in 2023)
- Claire McCaskill, former U.S. senator
- Jay Nixon, former governor of Missouri (2009–2017) and nominee for U.S. Senate in 1988 and 1998
- Brian Williams, state senator (2019–present) (ran for re-election)
- Clint Zweifel, former Missouri state treasurer (2009–2017)

=== Endorsements ===
Lucas Kunce

U.S. senators

- Bernie Sanders, U.S. senator from Vermont (2007–present) and U.S. representative for Vermont's at-large congressional district (1991–2007)

U.S. representatives

- Bill Clay, U.S. representative from Missouri's 1st congressional district (1969–2001)

State officials

- John Fetterman, lieutenant governor of Pennsylvania (2019–2023), mayor of Braddock (2006–2019), and Democratic nominee for U.S. Senate in Pennsylvania

State legislators

- Rasheen Aldridge Jr., state representative for Missouri's 78th district (2019–2023)
- Michael Johnson, state representative for Missouri's 23rd district (2021–present)
- Wes Shoemyer, state senator for Missouri's 18th district (2007–2011) and state representative for Missouri's 9th district (2001–2007)

Local officials

- Rita Heard Days, member of the St. Louis County Council (2019–present) and state senator (2003–2011)
- Ella Jones, mayor of Ferguson (2020–present)
- Tommie Pierson Sr., mayor of Bellefontaine Neighbors (2019–present) and state representative for Missouri's 66th district (2011–2017)
- Katheryn Shields, member of the Kansas City, Missouri City Council (2015–present) and county executive of Jackson County (1995–2007)

Individuals

- Jon Hamm, actor
- Stephanie Taylor, political activist, author, and co-founder of the Progressive Change Campaign Committee

Organizations

- Indivisible St. Louis
- League of Conservation Voters
- MoveOn
- Progressive Change Campaign Committee
- VoteVets

Newspapers and publications

- St. Louis Post-Dispatch
Trudy Busch Valentine

U.S. senators

- Jean Carnahan, U.S. senator from Missouri (2001–2002) and First Lady of Missouri (1993–2000)

U.S. representatives

- Emanuel Cleaver, U.S. representative from Missouri's 5th congressional district (2005–present) and mayor of Kansas City (1991–1999)
- Dick Gephardt, U.S. representative from Missouri's 3rd congressional district (1977–2005), House minority leader (1995–2003) and House majority leader (1989–1995)

State officials

- Bob Holden, governor of Missouri (2001–2005)

State legislators

- Marlon Anderson, state representative for Missouri's 76th district (2021–present)
- Lauren Arthur, state senator for Missouri's 17th district (2018–present) and state representative for Missouri's 18th district (2015–2018)
- Ashley Aune, state representative for Missouri's 14th district (2021–present)
- Donna Baringer, state representative for Missouri's 82nd district (2017–present)
- Doug Beck, state senator for Missouri's 1st district (2021–present) and state representative for Missouri's 92nd district (2017–2021)
- Steve Butz, state representative for Missouri's 81st district (2019–present)
- Keri Ingle, state representative for Missouri's 35th district (2019–present)
- Ian Mackey, state representative for Missouri's 99th district (2023–present) and 87th district (2019–2023)
- Tracy McCreery, state senator for Missouri's 24th district and state representative for Missouri's 88th district (2015–2023) and 83rd district (2012–2013)
- Wes Rogers, state representative for Missouri's 18th district (2019–present)
- Jill Schupp, state senator for Missouri's 24th district (2015–2023) and nominee for Missouri's 2nd congressional district in 2020
- Scott Sifton, state senator for Missouri's 1st district (2013–2021) and state representative for Missouri's 96th district (2011–2013)

Local officials

- Charlie Dooley, St. Louis County executive (2003–2015)
- Tishaura Jones, mayor of St. Louis (2021–present)
- Lyda Krewson, mayor of St. Louis (2017–2021)
- Francis Slay, mayor of St. Louis (2001–2017)

=== Polling ===
Graphical summary

Poll source	Date(s) administered	Sample size	Margin of error	Lucas Kunce	Spencer Toder	Trudy Busch Valentine	Carla "Coffee" Wright	Other	Undecided
SurveyUSA	July 24–27, 2022	547 (LV)	± 5.6%	14%	3%	40%	6%	9% (Note: Jewel Kelly, Ross, and all other candidates combined with 3%)	28%
Emerson College	July 21–23, 2022	1,000 (LV)	± 3.0%	35%	3%	39%	1%	1% (Note: Harris, Jewel Kelly, Pat Kelly, Rolen, Ross, Shipp, and Taylor with 0%)	22%
Triton Polling & Research (D) (Note: This poll was conducted for Toder's campaign.)	May 2022	~544 (LV)	± 4.2%	19%	24%	26%	–	–	31%
SurveyUSA	May 11–15, 2022	500 (LV)	± 5.0%	10%	3%	8%	3%	12% (Note: Harris, Jewel Kelly, Pat Kelly, Ross, and Taylor with 2%; Rolen and Shipp with 1%)	63%
Public Policy Polling (D) (Note: This poll was conducted for Kunce's campaign.)	April 13–14, 2022	546 (LV)	± 4.2%	25%	–	18%	–	–	56%

=== Results ===
Results by county: Busch Valentine: <40%; 40–50%; 50–60%; 60–70%; Kunce/Toder tie: <40%; Kunce: <40%; 40–50%; 50–60%

Democratic primary results
Party	Candidate	Votes	%
Democratic	Trudy Busch Valentine	158,957	43.2
Democratic	Lucas Kunce	141,203	38.3
Democratic	Spencer Toder	17,465	4.7
Democratic	Carla Coffee Wright	14,438	3.9
Democratic	Gena Ross	8,749	2.4
Democratic	Jewel Kelly	6,464	1.8
Democratic	Lewis Rolen	5,247	1.4
Democratic	Pat Kelly	5,002	1.4
Democratic	Ronald (Ron) William Harris	4,074	1.1
Democratic	Josh Shipp	3,334	0.9
Democratic	Clarence (Clay) Taylor	3,322	0.9
Total votes		368,255	100.0

== Libertarian primary ==
=== Candidates ===
==== Nominee ====
- Jonathan Dine, nominee for U.S. Senate in 2012 and 2016

=== Results ===
Libertarian primary results
Party	Candidate	Votes	%
Libertarian	Jonathan Dine	2,973	100.0
Total votes		2,973	100.0

== Constitution primary ==
=== Candidates ===
==== Nominee ====
- Paul Venable, information technology consultant and nominee for secretary of state in 2020

=== Results ===
Constitution primary results
Party	Candidate	Votes	%
Constitution	Paul Venable	792	100.0
Total votes		792	100.0

== Independents ==
=== Candidates ===
John Wood, a former Bush administration official and a January 6 Committee investigator, announced that he would run for the seat as an independent on June 29, but he withdrew from the race after former Missouri Governor Eric Greitens lost the Republican primary to Schmitt.

==== Withdrew ====
- Thomas Schneider, former mayor of Florissant (2011–2019) (endorsed Schatz and Valentine)
- John Wood, former senior counsel for the United States House Select Committee on the January 6 Attack, former U.S. attorney for the Western District of Missouri (2007–2009), and former general counsel for the US Chamber of Commerce

==== Missed ballot deadline ====
- Rick Seabaugh, sales manager
- Nicholas Strauss, network engineer

== General election ==
=== Predictions ===
Source	Ranking	As of
538	Solid R	November 7, 2022
The Cook Political Report	Solid R	November 7, 2022
DDHQ	Solid R	November 7, 2022
The Economist	Safe R	November 7, 2022
Fox News	Solid R	November 1, 2022
Inside Elections	Solid R	November 3, 2022
Politico	Likely R	August 12, 2022
RCP	Likely R	November 5, 2022
Sabato's Crystal Ball	Safe R	November 7, 2022

=== Debates ===
2022 United States Senate general election in Missouri debates
No.	Date	Host	Moderator	Republican	Democratic	Libertarian	Constitution
P Participant A Absent N Non-invitee I Invitee W Withdrawn							
P Participant A Absent N Non-invitee I Invitee W Withdrawn				Eric Schmitt	Trudy Busch Valentine	Jonathan Dine	Paul Venable
1	September 16, 2022	Missouri Press Association	David Lieb	A (Note: Schmitt was invited to the debate, but declined to attend)	P	P	P

=== Post-primary endorsements ===
Eric Schmitt (R)

Federal officials

- John Ashcroft, U.S. attorney general (2001–2005), U.S. senator from Missouri (1995–2001) and former governor of Missouri (1985–1993)
- Kit Bond, U.S. senator from Missouri (1987–2011) and former governor of Missouri (1981–1985;1973–1977)
- Roy Blunt, U.S. senator from Missouri (2011–2023)
- Vicky Hartzler, U.S. representative for Missouri's 4th congressional district (2011–2023)
- Josh Hawley, U.S. senator from Missouri (2019–present)
- Jim Talent, U.S. senator from Missouri (2002–2007) and U.S. representative for Missouri's 2nd congressional district (1993–2001)

State officials

- Jay Ashcroft, secretary of state of Missouri (2017–2025)
- Scott Fitzpatrick, treasurer of Missouri (2018–2023)
- Mike Kehoe, lieutenant governor of Missouri (2018–2025), and governor of Missouri (2025–present)
- Mike Parson, governor of Missouri (2018–2025)

Newspapers

- The Missouri Times

Organizations

- FreedomWorks For America
- Missouri Farm Bureau
- National Federation of Independent Business – Missouri
- National Rifle Association - Political Victory Fund
- National Right to Life Committee
Trudy Busch Valentine (D)

Organizations

- Human Rights Campaign
- National Education Association
- National Women's Political Caucus
- Sierra Club

Newspapers

- The Kansas City Star
John Wood (I) (withdrawn)

Federal officials

- John Danforth, United States ambassador to the United Nations (2004–2005) and U.S. senator from Missouri (1976–1995) (Republican)

=== Polling ===
Aggregate polls

Source of poll aggregation	Dates administered	Dates updated	Eric Schmitt (R)	Trudy Busch Valentine (D)	Undecided (Note: Calculated by taking the difference of 100% and all other candidates combined.)	Margin
RealClearPolitics	October 24 – November 1, 2022	November 1, 2022	52.0%	41.3%	6.7%	Schmitt +10.7
FiveThirtyEight	May 15 – November 4, 2022	November 4, 2022	53.1%	41.9%	5.0%	Schmitt +11.2
270towin	October 29 – November 7, 2022	November 7, 2022	52.0%	40.8%	7.2%	Schmitt +11.2
Average			52.4%	41.3%	6.3%	Schmitt +11.0

Graphical summary

Poll source	Date(s) administered	Sample size	Margin of error	Eric Schmitt (R)	Trudy Busch Valentine (D)	John Wood (I)	Other	Undecided
Civiqs	November 4–7, 2022	746 (LV)	± 4.7%	55%	40%	–	4% (Note: "Someone else" with 4%)	2%
The Trafalgar Group (R)	October 30 – November 1, 2022	1,079 (LV)	± 2.9%	53%	42%	–	2% (Note: Dine (L) with 2%)	2%
SurveyUSA	October 27 – November 1, 2022	791 (LV)	± 4.1%	50%	41%	–	3% (Note: "Another candidate" with 3%)	6%
Emerson College	October 26–28, 2022	1,000 (LV)	± 3.0%	54%	40%	–	5% (Note: Dine (L) with 3%; Venable (C) with 1%; "Someone else" with 1%)	–
Emerson College	October 26–28, 2022	1,000 (LV)	± 3.0%	51%	39%	–	4% (Note: Dine (L) with 2%; Venable (C) with 1%; "Someone else" with 1%)	6%
Remington Research (R)	October 24–25, 2022	1,011 (LV)	± 3.0%	51%	42%	–	3% (Note: Dine with 2% and Venable with 1%)	4%
Emerson College	September 23–27, 2022	1,160 (VLV)	± 2.8%	49%	38%	–	3%	10%
SurveyUSA	September 14–18, 2022	670 (LV)	± 4.4%	47%	36%	–	4%	14%
Remington Research (R)	August 24–25, 2022	1,011 (LV)	± 3.0%	51%	40%	–	2% (Note: Dine and Venable with 1%)	7%
	August 23, 2022	Wood withdraws from the race						
YouGov/SLU	August 8–16, 2022	900 (LV)	± 3.8%	49%	38%	–	5%	8%
YouGov/SLU	August 8–16, 2022	900 (LV)	± 3.8%	44%	31%	10%	3%	13%
SurveyUSA	July 24–27, 2022	1,591 (LV)	± 3.0%	36%	30%	9%	6%	18%
SurveyUSA	May 11–15, 2022	1,412 (LV)	± 3.2%	47%	34%	–	–	19%
Remington Research (R)	April 27–28, 2022	986 (LV)	± 3.0%	50%	32%	–	–	18%

Hypothetical polling

Eric Greitens vs. Lucas Kunce

Poll source	Date(s) administered	Sample size	Margin of error	Eric Greitens (R)	Lucas Kunce (D)	John Wood (I)	Other	Undecided
SurveyUSA	July 24–27, 2022	1,591 (LV)	± 3.0%	31%	26%	13%	10%	21%
SurveyUSA	May 11–15, 2022	1,412 (LV)	± 3.2%	42%	36%	–	–	22%
The Trafalgar Group (R)	March 9–13, 2022	1,075 (LV)	± 3.0%	46%	45%	–	–	9%
co/efficient (R)	December 16–17, 2021	1,210 (LV)	± 4.2%	34%	26%	–	–	40%
Fabrizio, Lee & Associates (R)	October 3–4, 2021	600 (LV)	± 4.0%	47%	40%	–	–	13%

Eric Greitens vs. Trudy Busch Valentine

Poll source	Date(s) administered	Sample size	Margin of error	Eric Greitens (R)	Trudy Busch Valentine (D)	John Wood (I)	Other	Undecided
SurveyUSA	July 24–27, 2022	1,591 (LV)	± 3.0%	31%	31%	10%	8%	20%
SurveyUSA	May 11–15, 2022	1,412 (LV)	± 3.2%	43%	37%	–	–	20%
Remington Research (R)/Missouri Scout	April 27–28, 2022	986 (LV)	± 3.0%	46%	37%	–	–	17%

Vicky Hartzler vs. Lucas Kunce

Poll source	Date(s) administered	Sample size	Margin of error	Vicky Hartzler (R)	Lucas Kunce (D)	John Wood (I)	Other	Undecided
SurveyUSA	July 24–27, 2022	1,591 (LV)	± 3.0%	34%	25%	12%	9%	20%
SurveyUSA	May 11–15, 2022	1,412 (LV)	± 3.2%	45%	31%	–	–	24%
The Trafalgar Group (R)	March 9–13, 2022	1,075 (LV)	± 3.0%	56%	39%	–	–	5%
co/efficient (R)	December 16–17, 2021	1,210 (LV)	± 4.2%	23%	16%	–	–	61%

Vicky Hartzler vs. Trudy Busch Valentine

Poll source	Date(s) administered	Sample size	Margin of error	Vicky Hartzler (R)	Trudy Busch Valentine (D)	John Wood (I)	Other	Undecided
SurveyUSA	July 24–27, 2022	1,591 (LV)	± 3.0%	32%	31%	9%	7%	21%
SurveyUSA	May 11–15, 2022	1,412 (LV)	± 3.2%	44%	33%	–	–	23%
Remington Research (R)/Missouri Scout	April 27–28, 2022	986 (LV)	± 3.0%	49%	33%	–	–	18%

Billy Long vs. Lucas Kunce

Poll source	Date(s) administered	Sample size	Margin of error	Billy Long (R)	Lucas Kunce (D)	Undecided
co/efficient (R)	December 16–17, 2021	1,210 (LV)	± 4.2%	16%	17%	67%

Eric Schmitt vs. Lucas Kunce

Poll source	Date(s) administered	Sample size	Margin of error	Eric Schmitt (R)	Lucas Kunce (D)	John Wood (I)	Other	Undecided
SurveyUSA	July 24–27, 2022	1,591 (LV)	± 3.0%	37%	27%	10%	6%	20%
SurveyUSA	May 11–15, 2022	1,412 (LV)	± 3.2%	46%	34%	–	–	19%
The Trafalgar Group (R)	March 9–13, 2022	1,075 (LV)	± 3.0%	55%	40%	–	–	5%
co/efficient (R)	December 16–17, 2021	1,210 (LV)	± 4.2%	28%	23%	–	–	49%

Eric Greitens vs. Lucas Kunce vs. generic independent

Poll source	Date(s) administered	Sample size	Margin of error	Eric Greitens (R)	Lucas Kunce (D)	Generic Independent	Undecided
Bendixen & Amandi International (SAM) (Note: Poll conducted for the Serve America Movement)	February 2–6, 2022	800 (LV)	± 3.5%	27%	25%	26%	22%

Eric Greitens vs. Jay Nixon

Poll source	Date(s) administered	Sample size	Margin of error	Eric Greitens (R)	Jay Nixon (D)	Undecided
Remington Research (R)/Missouri Scout	July 14–15, 2021	922 (LV)	± 3.0%	48%	44%	8%
Remington Research (R)/Missouri Scout	April 7–8, 2021	936 (LV)	± 3.0%	48%	44%	8%

Eric Greitens vs. Scott Sifton

Poll source	Date(s) administered	Sample size	Margin of error	Eric Greitens (R)	Scott Sifton (D)	Undecided
The Trafalgar Group (R)	March 9–13, 2022	1,075 (LV)	± 3.0%	45%	45%	10%
co/efficient (R)	December 16–17, 2021	1,210 (LV)	± 4.2%	39%	26%	35%
Fabrizio, Lee & Associates (R)	October 3–4, 2021	600 (LV)	± 4.0%	46%	40%	14%
Remington Research (R)/Missouri Scout	April 7–8, 2021	936 (LV)	± 3.0%	49%	42%	9%
Remington Research (R)/Missouri Scout	February 17–18, 2021	954 (LV)	± 3.0%	49%	41%	10%

Eric Greitens vs. generic Democrat

Poll source	Date(s) administered	Sample size	Margin of error	Eric Greitens (R)	Generic Democrat	Undecided
WPA Intelligence (R) (Note: Poll conducted for Team PAC, which supports Greitens)	November 16–18, 2021	600 (LV)	± 4.0%	49%	36%	15%
Fabrizio, Lee & Associates (R)	October 3–4, 2021	600 (LV)	± 4.0%	47%	41%	12%

Generic Republican vs. generic Democrat

Poll source	Date(s) administered	Sample size	Margin of error	Generic Republican	Generic Democrat	Undecided
co/efficient (R)	December 16–17, 2021	1,210 (LV)	± 4.2%	52%	35%	13%

Vicky Hartzler vs. Scott Sifton

Poll source	Date(s) administered	Sample size	Margin of error	Vicky Hartzler (R)	Scott Sifton (D)	Undecided
The Trafalgar Group (R)	March 9–13, 2022	1,075 (LV)	± 3.0%	57%	37%	6%
co/efficient (R)	December 16–17, 2021	1,210 (LV)	± 4.2%	22%	17%	61%

Billy Long vs. Scott Sifton

Poll source	Date(s) administered	Sample size	Margin of error	Billy Long (R)	Scott Sifton (D)	Undecided
co/efficient (R)	December 16–17, 2021	1,210 (LV)	± 4.2%	13%	12%	75%

Eric Schmitt vs. Jay Nixon

Poll source	Date(s) administered	Sample size	Margin of error	Eric Schmitt (R)	Jay Nixon (D)	Undecided
Remington Research (R)/Missouri Scout	April 7–8, 2021	936 (LV)	± 3.0%	50%	42%	8%

Eric Schmitt vs. Scott Sifton

Poll source	Date(s) administered	Sample size	Margin of error	Eric Schmitt (R)	Scott Sifton (D)	Undecided
The Trafalgar Group (R)	March 9–13, 2022	1,075 (LV)	± 3.0%	54%	40%	6%
co/efficient (R)	December 16–17, 2021	1,210 (LV)	± 4.2%	23%	18%	60%
Remington Research (R)/Missouri Scout	April 7–8, 2021	936 (LV)	± 3.0%	51%	39%	10%

Roy Blunt vs. Jason Kander

Poll source	Date(s) administered	Sample size	Margin of error	Roy Blunt (R)	Jason Kander (D)	Undecided
Data for Progress (D) (Note: Poll conducted for MoveOn)	January 10–12, 2021	571 (LV)	± 4.1%	45%	44%	12%

Roy Blunt vs. Scott Sifton

Poll source	Date(s) administered	Sample size	Margin of error	Roy Blunt (R)	Scott Sifton (D)	Undecided
Remington Research (R)/Missouri Scout	February 17–18, 2021	954 (LV)	± 3.0%	50%	40%	10%
Remington Research (R)/Missouri Scout	January 6–7, 2021	980 (LV)	± 3.0%	52%	34%	14%

=== Results ===
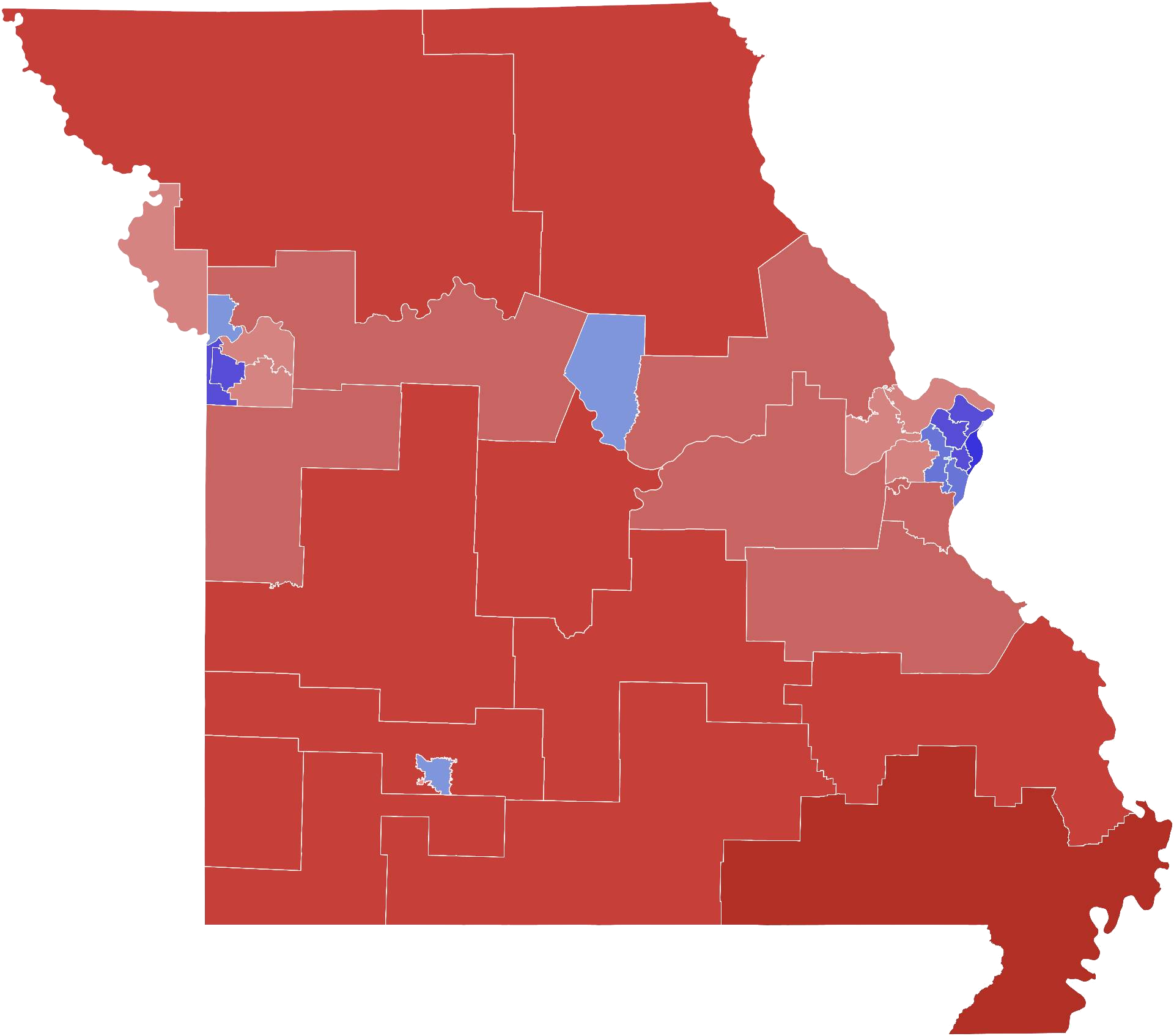
State senate district results

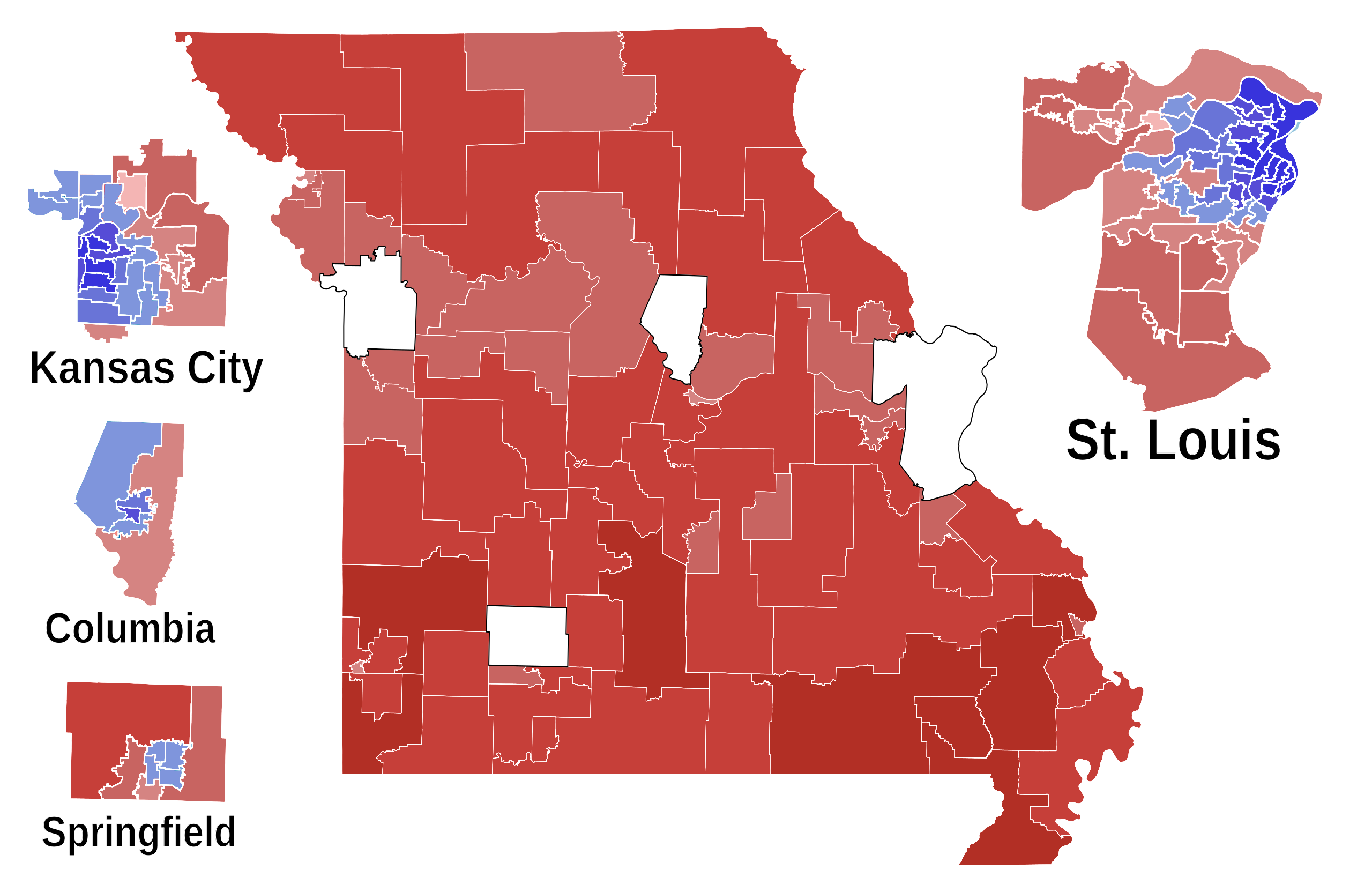
State house district results

Schmitt prevailed over Valentine on Election Day.

2022 United States Senate election in Missouri
Party	Candidate	Votes	%	±%
Republican	Eric Schmitt	1,146,966	55.43%	+6.25%
Democratic	Trudy Busch Valentine	872,694	42.18%	−4.21%
Libertarian	Jonathan Dine	34,821	1.68%	−0.74%
Constitution	Paul Venable	14,608	0.71%	−0.20%
Write-in		41	0.00%	−0.03%
Total votes		2,069,130	100.00%	N/A
Republican hold				

==== By county ====
County	Eric Schmitt Republican		Trudy Busch Valentine Democratic		Various candidates Other parties		Margin		Total
County	#	%	#	%	#	%	#	%	Total
Adair	4,423	62.55%	2,460	34.79%	188	2.66%	1,963	27.76%	7,071
Andrew	4,885	72.62%	1,657	24.63%	185	2.75%	3,228	47.99%	6,727
Atchison	1,468	76.86%	392	20.52%	50	2.62%	1,076	56.34%	1,910
Audrain	5,209	69.74%	2,069	27.70%	191	2.56%	3,140	42.04%	7,469
Barry	8,537	77.80%	2,046	18.65%	390	3.55%	6,491	59.15%	10,973
Barton	3,654	84.47%	586	13.55%	86	1.99%	3,068	70.92%	4,326
Bates	4,227	73.31%	1,362	23.62%	177	3.07%	2,865	49.69%	5,766
Benton	5,717	73.98%	1,773	22.94%	238	3.08%	3,944	51.04%	7,728
Bollinger	3,589	86.11%	507	12.16%	72	1.73%	3,082	73.94%	4,168
Boone	25,940	41.10%	35,608	56.42%	1,562	2.48%	-9,668	-15.32%	63,110
Buchanan	14,828	60.35%	8,884	36.16%	858	3.49%	5,944	24.19%	24,570
Butler	9,345	81.13%	1,872	16.25%	302	2.62%	7,473	64.88%	11,519
Caldwell	2,588	75.41%	745	21.71%	99	2.88%	1,843	53.70%	3,432
Callaway	9,917	66.10%	4,622	30.81%	464	3.09%	5,295	35.29%	15,003
Camden	13,380	73.16%	4,384	23.97%	525	2.87%	8,996	49.19%	18,289
Cape Girardeau	20,511	73.55%	6,650	23.85%	727	2.61%	13,861	49.70%	27,888
Carroll	2,610	77.70%	685	20.39%	64	1.91%	1,925	57.31%	3,359
Carter	1,578	82.57%	298	15.59%	35	1.83%	1,280	66.98%	1,911
Cass	24,848	62.43%	13,927	34.99%	1,024	2.57%	10,921	27.44%	39,799
Cedar	3,962	76.95%	929	18.04%	258	5.01%	3,033	58.90%	5,149
Chariton	2,083	74.05%	667	23.71%	63	2.24%	1,416	50.34%	2,813
Christian	24,206	72.69%	8,070	24.23%	1,024	3.08%	16,136	48.46%	33,300
Clark	1,738	73.99%	535	22.78%	76	3.24%	1,203	51.21%	2,349
Clay	43,210	49.44%	41,987	48.04%	2,209	2.53%	1,223	1.40%	87,406
Clinton	5,147	68.00%	2,219	29.32%	203	2.68%	2,928	38.68%	7,569
Cole	18,289	64.09%	9,487	33.24%	762	2.67%	8,802	30.84%	28,538
Cooper	4,198	68.51%	1,737	28.35%	193	3.15%	2,461	40.16%	6,128
Crawford	5,822	76.58%	1,610	21.18%	171	2.25%	4,212	55.40%	7,603
Dade	2,395	79.91%	501	16.72%	101	3.37%	1,894	63.20%	2,997
Dallas	4,449	77.35%	1,097	19.07%	206	3.58%	3,352	58.28%	5,752
Daviess	2,029	74.90%	608	22.44%	72	2.66%	1,421	52.45%	2,709
DeKalb	2,575	75.87%	700	20.62%	119	3.51%	1,875	55.24%	3,394
Dent	4,030	80.37%	822	16.39%	162	3.23%	3,208	63.98%	5,014
Douglas	4,101	81.50%	780	15.50%	151	3.00%	3,321	66.00%	5,032
Dunklin	4,906	78.87%	1,167	18.76%	147	2.36%	3,739	60.11%	6,220
Franklin	25,089	67.65%	11,139	30.03%	860	2.32%	13,950	37.61%	37,088
Gasconade	4,306	75.39%	1,299	22.74%	107	1.87%	3,007	52.64%	5,712
Gentry	1,748	75.18%	528	22.71%	49	2.11%	1,220	52.47%	2,325
Greene	55,499	56.63%	39,211	40.01%	3,301	3.37%	16,288	16.62%	98,011
Grundy	2,514	77.93%	641	19.87%	71	2.20%	1,873	58.06%	3,226
Harrison	2,237	81.76%	445	16.26%	54	1.97%	1,792	65.50%	2,736
Henry	5,232	69.50%	2,084	27.68%	212	2.82%	3,148	41.82%	7,528
Hickory	2,747	74.89%	796	21.70%	125	3.41%	1,951	53.19%	3,668
Holt	1,383	82.76%	262	15.68%	26	1.56%	1,121	67.09%	1,671
Howard	2,529	65.32%	1,212	31.30%	131	3.38%	1,317	34.01%	3,872
Howell	10,336	77.73%	2,452	18.44%	510	3.84%	7,884	59.29%	13,298
Iron	2,246	73.11%	747	24.32%	79	2.57%	1,499	48.80%	3,072
Jackson	80,824	37.31%	131,038	60.50%	4,739	2.19%	-50,214	-23.18%	216,601
Jasper	25,183	72.58%	8,500	24.50%	1,016	2.93%	16,683	48.08%	34,699
Jefferson	48,881	61.53%	28,670	36.09%	1,887	2.38%	20,211	25.44%	79,438
Johnson	10,019	63.93%	5,134	32.76%	519	3.31%	4,885	31.17%	15,672
Knox	996	72.91%	317	23.21%	53	3.88%	679	49.71%	1,366
Laclede	9,018	79.45%	1,948	17.16%	385	3.39%	7,070	62.29%	11,351
Lafayette	8,233	68.44%	3,525	29.30%	272	2.26%	4,708	39.14%	12,030
Lawrence	9,834	78.29%	2,316	18.44%	411	3.27%	7,518	59.85%	12,561
Lewis	2,339	74.21%	716	22.72%	97	3.08%	1,623	51.49%	3,152
Lincoln	14,099	70.95%	5,202	26.18%	572	2.88%	8,897	44.77%	19,873
Linn	2,915	70.56%	1,129	27.33%	87	2.11%	1,786	43.23%	4,131
Livingston	3,523	74.28%	1,131	23.85%	89	1.88%	2,392	50.43%	4,743
Macon	4,264	76.31%	1,174	21.01%	150	2.68%	3,090	55.30%	5,588
Madison	2,907	78.15%	721	19.38%	92	2.47%	2,186	58.76%	3,720
Maries	2,737	79.24%	652	18.88%	65	1.88%	2,085	60.36%	3,454
Marion	6,254	71.94%	2,197	25.27%	242	2.78%	4,057	46.67%	8,693
McDonald	5,001	82.10%	887	14.56%	203	3.33%	4,114	67.54%	6,091
Mercer	1,028	81.33%	213	16.85%	23	1.82%	815	64.48%	1,264
Miller	6,889	78.83%	1,574	18.01%	276	3.16%	5,315	60.82%	8,739
Mississippi	2,237	77.24%	592	20.44%	67	2.31%	1,645	56.80%	2,896
Moniteau	3,903	76.11%	1,088	21.22%	137	2.67%	2,815	54.89%	5,128
Monroe	2,344	74.22%	739	23.40%	75	2.37%	1,605	50.82%	3,158
Montgomery	2,990	73.19%	1,015	24.85%	80	1.96%	1,975	48.35%	4,085
Morgan	5,150	74.09%	1,584	22.79%	217	3.12%	3,566	51.30%	6,951
New Madrid	3,347	75.86%	964	21.85%	101	2.29%	2,383	54.01%	4,412
Newton	15,565	78.07%	3,878	19.45%	494	2.48%	11,687	58.62%	19,937
Nodaway	4,757	67.37%	2,156	30.53%	148	2.10%	2,601	36.84%	7,061
Oregon	2,391	77.86%	571	18.59%	109	3.55%	1,820	59.26%	3,071
Osage	4,587	82.90%	856	15.47%	90	1.63%	3,731	67.43%	5,533
Ozark	2,960	80.02%	610	16.49%	129	3.49%	2,350	63.53%	3,699
Pemiscot	2,457	76.38%	707	21.98%	53	1.65%	1,750	54.40%	3,217
Perry	5,113	80.65%	1,101	17.37%	126	1.99%	4,012	63.28%	6,340
Pettis	9,032	68.67%	3,677	27.96%	443	3.37%	5,355	40.72%	13,152
Phelps	9,268	68.06%	4,001	29.38%	349	2.56%	5,267	38.68%	13,618
Pike	3,738	72.34%	1,299	25.14%	130	2.52%	2,439	47.20%	5,167
Platte	20,304	49.38%	19,918	48.44%	898	2.18%	386	0.94%	41,120
Polk	7,948	75.24%	2,184	20.68%	431	4.08%	5,764	54.57%	10,563
Pulaski	6,703	71.97%	2,224	23.88%	386	4.14%	4,479	48.09%	9,313
Putnam	1,379	80.46%	287	16.74%	48	2.80%	1,092	63.71%	1,714
Ralls	2,917	73.25%	935	23.48%	130	3.26%	1,982	49.77%	3,982
Randolph	5,242	70.61%	1,954	26.32%	228	3.07%	3,288	44.29%	7,424
Ray	5,286	66.58%	2,403	30.27%	250	3.15%	2,883	36.21%	7,939
Reynolds	1,817	75.83%	512	21.37%	67	2.80%	1,305	54.47%	2,396
Ripley	3,005	80.46%	609	16.31%	121	3.24%	2,396	64.15%	3,735
Saline	4,030	64.19%	2,079	33.12%	169	2.69%	1,951	31.08%	6,278
Schuyler	1,182	77.25%	304	19.87%	44	2.88%	878	57.39%	1,530
Scotland	1,010	74.26%	305	22.43%	45	3.31%	705	51.84%	1,360
Scott	9,210	79.23%	2,161	18.59%	254	2.18%	7,049	60.64%	11,625
Shannon	2,243	77.08%	586	20.14%	81	2.78%	1,657	56.94%	2,910
Shelby	1,753	76.28%	479	20.84%	66	2.87%	1,274	55.44%	2,298
St. Charles	83,559	55.34%	64,552	42.76%	2,868	1.90%	19,007	12.59%	150,979
St. Clair	2,711	73.43%	835	22.62%	146	3.95%	1,876	50.81%	3,692
St. Francois	12,552	68.82%	5,197	28.50%	489	2.68%	7,355	40.33%	18,238
St. Louis City	12,835	15.26%	69,839	83.05%	1,422	1.69%	-57,004	-67.78%	84,096
St. Louis County	137,197	37.12%	226,772	61.35%	5,659	1.53%	-89,575	-24.23%	369,628
Ste. Genevieve	4,329	65.20%	2,181	32.85%	130	1.96%	2,148	32.35%	6,640
Stoddard	7,320	84.75%	1,145	13.26%	172	1.99%	6,175	71.49%	8,637
Stone	10,784	78.09%	2,662	19.28%	363	2.63%	8,122	58.82%	13,809
Sullivan	1,360	77.98%	344	19.72%	40	2.29%	1,016	58.26%	1,744
Taney	13,734	77.18%	3,542	19.90%	519	2.92%	10,192	57.27%	17,795
Texas	6,621	80.19%	1,337	16.19%	299	3.62%	5,284	63.99%	8,257
Vernon	4,620	75.05%	1,325	21.52%	211	3.43%	3,295	53.53%	6,156
Warren	9,103	69.11%	3,768	28.61%	301	2.29%	5,335	40.50%	13,172
Washington	5,267	75.96%	1,498	21.60%	169	2.44%	3,769	54.36%	6,934
Wayne	3,374	83.02%	605	14.89%	85	2.09%	2,769	68.13%	4,064
Webster	10,667	75.09%	3,008	21.17%	531	3.74%	7,659	53.91%	14,206
Worth	651	75.43%	184	21.32%	28	3.24%	467	54.11%	863
Wright	5,210	83.44%	819	13.12%	215	3.44%	4,391	70.32%	6,244
Totals	1,146,966	55.43%	872,694	42.18%	49,470	2.39%	274,272	13.26%	2,069,130

Counties that flipped from Democratic to Republican

- Clay (largest city: Kansas City (Note: Most of the city lies within Jackson County, with portions spilling into Clay, Cass, and Platte counties.))
- Platte (largest city: Kansas City)

==== By congressional district ====
Schmitt won six of eight congressional districts.

District	Schmitt	Busch Valentine	Representative
1st	20%	79%	Cori Bush
2nd	51%	48%	Ann Wagner
3rd	59%	38%	Blaine Luetkemeyer
4th	66%	31%	Vicky Hartzler (117th Congress)
4th	66%	31%	Mark Alford (118th Congress)
5th	35%	62%	Emanuel Cleaver
6th	65%	32%	Sam Graves
7th	68%	29%	Billy Long (117th Congress)
7th	68%	29%	Eric Burlison (118th Congress)
8th	73%	24%	Jason Smith

== See also ==
- 2022 United States Senate elections
- 2022 Missouri elections

== Notes ==
Partisan clients
