= Senator Engler =

Senator Engler may refer to:

- John Engler (born 1948), Michigan State Senate
- Kevin P. Engler (born 1959), Missouri State Senate
