= Elaine Gannon =

American politician

Member of the Missouri Senate from the 3rd district
- In office January 6, 2021 – January 8, 2025
- Preceded by: Gary Romine
- Succeeded by: Mike Henderson

Member of the Missouri House of Representatives from the 115th district
- In office January 9, 2013 – January 6, 2021
- Preceded by: Joseph Fallert Jr. (redistricting)
- Succeeded by: Cyndi Buchheit-Courtway

Personal details
- Born: February 2, 1953 (age 73) Bonne Terre, Missouri
- Party: Republican
- Spouse: Dennis
- Children: 2
- Profession: Teacher

Elaine Gannon (born February 2, 1953) is an American politician. She was a member of the Missouri Senate, representing District 3. She left office on January 8, 2025. She is also a former member of the Missouri House of Representatives, having served from 2013 to 2021. She is a member of the Republican Party.

== Missouri State Senate ==
Elected in 2020, she preceded fellow Republican Gary Romine, after serving eight years in the Missouri House of Representatives.

=== Committee assignments ===
- Education
- General Laws
- Progress and Development
- Seniors, Families, Veterans and Military Affairs, Vice-Chairwoman
- Joint Committee on Education
- Joint Committee on Child Abuse and Neglect
- Joint Committee on Legislative Research
- Missouri Assistive Technology Advisory Council

== Views and response ==
Gannon sponsored a measure for Senate consideration in December 2022, which was aimed at extending Medicaid health insurance coverage for low-income mothers, from the current sixty days to twelve months following the birth of a baby. Bipartisan efforts to increase postnatal coverage for low-income families have been ongoing, with two bills failing earlier in 2022.

In another bipartisan position, Gannon spoke against the actions of a group of Republican senators. The men, calling themselves the "Conservative Caucus", were blocking debate and delaying procedures to adopt a new congressional map. The redistricting was a bipartisan proposal which had already passed the house, but the Conservative Caucus faction obstructed action on it for several days. Speaking as part of a group of bipartisan women senators who were critical of the hardliner's intransigence and dominance of the debate, Gannon noted: "I think it's time that we the women of the Senate say what we want to say".

During a March, 2022, Senate Education committee hearing, Gannon attracted negative attention when she asked a 14-year-old witness, who identified as transgender and non-binary: "Are you going to go through the procedure?". The enquiry caused "an eruption of shouts", according to the St. Louis Post-Dispatch and "audible groans", according to Vice News. She was also criticized for her approach throughout the hearing, where she used expressions such as "he-she" in referring to transgender persons. The Senator later apologized for the inappropriate question. The teenage witness and the parent of the 14-year-old were critical of both Gannon and the hearing, which had been called to hear views on the proposed "Save Women's Sports Act". The bill would restrict children's access to sporting activity, disallowing participation in competitions by individuals whose assigned-sex at birth differs from the sex designated for the sporting activity.

== Personal life ==
She was born in Bonne Terre, and lives in De Soto, Missouri, with her husband, Dennis.

== Electoral history ==
=== State representative ===
Missouri House of Representatives Election, November 6, 2012, District 115
Party	Candidate	Votes	%	±%
Republican	Elaine Freeman Gannon	6,909	50.86%	
Democratic	Rich McCane	6,676	49.14%	

Missouri House of Representatives Election, November 4, 2014, District 115
Party	Candidate	Votes	%	±%
Republican	Elaine Freeman Gannon	5,055	63.89%	+13.03
Democratic	Dan Darian	2,473	31.26%	−17.88
Constitution	Jerry Dollar Jr.	384	4.85%	+4.85

Missouri House of Representatives Election, November 8, 2016, District 115
Party	Candidate	Votes	%	±%
Republican	Elaine Freeman Gannon	10,110	68.64%	+4.75
Democratic	Barbara Stocker	3,972	26.97%	−4.29
Libertarian	Charles D. Bigelow	646	4.39%	+4.39

Missouri House of Representatives Election, November 6, 2018, District 115
Party	Candidate	Votes	%	±%
Republican	Elaine Freeman Gannon	10,598	100.00%	+31.36

=== State Senate ===
Missouri's 3rd State Senate District, Republican Primary, August 4, 2020
Party	Candidate	Votes	%	±%
Republican	Elaine Gannon	10,646	42.09%	N/A
Republican	Joshua Barrett	9,211	36.42%	N/A
Republican	Kent Scism	5,437	21.49%	N/A

Missouri's 3rd State Senate District, General Election, November 3, 2020
Party	Candidate	Votes	%	±%
Republican	Elaine Gannon	65,686	100%	
Republican hold				
