= Linda Black (politician) =

American politician

Member of the Missouri House of Representatives from the 117th district
- In office 2009–2017
- Preceded by: Brad Robinson
- Succeeded by: Mike Henderson

Personal details
- Born: 1970 (age 55–56) Bonne Terre, Missouri
- Party: Republican (since 2014)
- Other political affiliations: Democratic (until 2014)
- Education: Mineral Area College; Central Methodist University; Southwest Baptist University
- Occupation: Teacher

Linda Black (nee Fischer) is a former member of the Missouri House of Representatives, serving from 2009 to 2017. Before being elected to the legislature, Black was a public school teacher. She has also served as treasurer of Bonne Terre and Chief Deputy Treasurer of St. Francois County.

Black was elected to the Missouri House as a member of the Democratic Party. After Republicans made gains in the Missouri House in the 2014 elections, Black announced her intention to switch parties, citing her anti-abortion views.
