= Scott Sifton =

American politician and lawyer

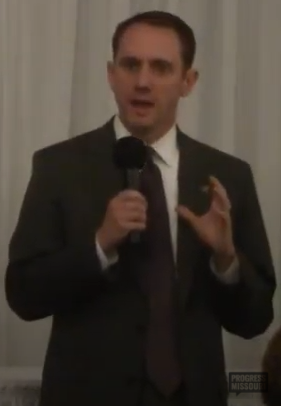
- Sifton in 2012

Member of the Missouri Senate from the 1st district
- In office January 9, 2013 – January 6, 2021
- Preceded by: Jim Lembke
- Succeeded by: Doug Beck

Member of the Missouri House of Representatives from the 96th district
- In office January 5, 2011 – January 9, 2013
- Preceded by: Patricia M. Yaeger
- Succeeded by: Mike Leara

Personal details
- Born: Richard Prescott Sifton Jr. May 7, 1974 (age 52)
- Party: Democratic
- Education: Truman State University (BA); University of Michigan (JD)

Richard Prescott Sifton Jr. (born May 7, 1974) is an American politician and lawyer who was a member of the Missouri Senate for the 1st district from 2013 to 2021. Sifton took office in 2013 after defeating incumbent Republican Senator Jim Lembke in a close election. Sifton was a candidate in the 2022 U.S. Senate election in Missouri but later withdrew.

== Early life and education ==
Sifton grew up in Kansas City, Missouri and graduated from Truman State University in 1996, where he served as Student Senate President and was a founding member of the Truman chapter of Beta Theta Pi. Sifton received his Juris Doctor from the University of Michigan Law School in 1999. His first political experience came working for President Bill Clinton's re-election campaign in 1996 and he worked on a state bus tour for Missouri Governor Mel Carnahan. During law school he clerked for then-Missouri Attorney General Jay Nixon.

== Career ==
Before being elected to office, Sifton worked in the Missouri Attorney General's office as a special prosecutor, focusing on public corruption, senior fraud, nursing home patient neglect, methamphetamine manufacturing and defending against criminal appeals.

Sifton also served on the Affton School Board from 2001 to 2010. He first ran for the Missouri House of Representatives in 2002, losing to Republican incumbent Kathlyn Fares of the 91st district by 9,463 votes (57.55%) to 6,981 (42.45%). He ran again in 2010 to succeeding term-limited Democrat Patricia M. Yaeger of the 96th district. In the general election, he defeated Republican nominee Anthony Leech, a retired communications manager and Cool Valley local officeholder by 5,655 votes (58.20%) to 4,062 (41.80%).

Sifton served in the State House from 2011 to 2013. He did not run for re-election in 2012, instead running for the State Senate. He faced fellow State Representative Sue Schoemehl in the Democratic primary. Schoemehl, more socially conservative, was endorsed by Missouri Right to Life for supporting government restrictions to abortion access. Sifton opposes increasing restrictions and was endorsed by the Missouri chapter of NARAL Pro-Choice America. Sifton contrasted his refusal to accept any gifts, meals or entertainment from lobbyists with Schoemehl's willingness to accept them. He defeated Schoemehl by 6,720 votes (54.93%) to 5,513 (45.07%). He faced Republican incumbent Jim Lembke in the general election, defeating him by 45,689 votes (50.91%) to 44,055 (49.09%).

In the Senate, Sifton played an integral role in filibustering a bill that mandated a 72-hour waiting period for women seeking abortions. He has also fought against attempts to implement anti-union "right-to-work" laws in Missouri.

In November 2014, Sifton declared his intent to run for Attorney General of Missouri in the 2016 election. However, he withdrew from the race the following July and chose to run for re-election, instead. On November 8, 2016, Sifton was re-elected with 53% of the vote over former Webster Groves city councilman Randy Jotte who had 43,227 votes to Sifton's 48,926 votes.

On February 8, 2021, he announced a run in the 2022 U.S. Senate election in Missouri., but later withdrew from the race.

== Personal life ==
Sifton resides in Affton, Missouri with his two children. They attend Webster Groves Presbyterian Church, where Sifton served previously as Chairman of the Deacons.

Missouri House of Representatives
Preceded by Patricia M. Yaeger	Member of the Missouri House of Representatives from the 96th district 2011–2013	Succeeded by Mike Leara
Missouri Senate
Preceded by Jim Lembke	Member of the Missouri Senate from the 1st district 2013–2021	Succeeded by Doug Beck
