= Patricia M. Yaeger =

American politician

Member of the Missouri House of Representatives from the 96th district
- In office 2003–2011
- Succeeded by: Scott Sifton

Personal details
- Party: Democratic

Patricia M. Yaeger is an American politician. She was a member of the Missouri House of Representatives for the 96th district from 2003 until 2011.
