= Mike Henderson (politician) =

American politician from Missouri

Member of the Missouri Senate from the 3rd district
- Incumbent
- Assumed office January 8, 2025
- Preceded by: Elaine Gannon

Speaker pro tempore of the Missouri House of Representatives
- In office January 4, 2023 – January 8, 2025
- Preceded by: John Wiemann
- Succeeded by: Chad Perkins

Member of the Missouri House of Representatives from the 117th district
- In office January 2017 – January 8, 2025
- Preceded by: Linda Black
- Succeeded by: Becky Laubinger

Personal details
- Born: 1958 or 1959 (age 66–67) Cape Girardeau, Missouri, U.S.
- Party: Republican
- Children: 2
- Education: Murray State University (BA); Missouri State University (MA, EdS)

Mike Henderson (born 1958/1959) is an American politician. He is a member of the Missouri Senate from the 3rd district, serving since 2025. He was a member of the Missouri House of Representatives from the 117th District, serving from 2017 to 2025. He is a member of the Republican party.

== Political issues ==
=== Petitions ===
Henderson sponsored a bill that would make the initiative petition process for voters to amend the state constitution more difficult by raising the required threshold of votes. The bill raised national attention as being the first such proposal, as well as potentially violating the Fourteenth Amendment to the United States Constitution.

== Electoral history ==
Missouri House of Representatives Primary Election, August 2, 2016, District 117
Party	Candidate	Votes	%	±%
Republican	Mike Henderson	1,617	59.43%	
Republican	Mike Miller	1,104	40.57%	
Total votes		2,721	100.00%	

Missouri House of Representatives Election, November 8, 2016, District 117
Party	Candidate	Votes	%	±%
Republican	Mike Henderson	7,302	56.74%	
Democratic	Travis Barnes	5,567	43.26%	
Total votes		12,869	100.00%	

Missouri House of Representatives Election, November 6, 2018, District 117
Party	Candidate	Votes	%	±%
Republican	Mike Henderson	8,169	72.06%	+15.32
Democratic	Kayla Chick	3,168	27.94%	−15.32
Total votes		11,337	100.00%	

Missouri House of Representatives Election, November 3, 2020, District 117
Party	Candidate	Votes	%	±%
Republican	Mike Henderson	10,485	73.31%	+1.25
Democratic	Tony Dorsett	3,817	26.69%	−1.25
Total votes		14,302	100.00%	

Missouri House of Representatives Election, November 8, 2022, District 117
Party	Candidate	Votes	%	±%
Republican	Mike Henderson	8,722	100.00%	+26.69
Total votes		8,722	100.00%	

Missouri House of Representatives
Preceded by John Wiemann	Speaker pro tempore of the Missouri House of Representatives; 2023–2025	Succeeded by Chad Perkins
