= Irene Treppler =

American politician

Member of the Missouri Senate from the 1st district
- In office January 9, 1985 – January 8, 1997
- Preceded by: James W. Murphy
- Succeeded by: Anita Yeckel

Member of the Missouri House of Representatives from the 100th district
- In office January 5, 1983 – January 9, 1985
- Preceded by: Thomas J. Eckhardt
- Succeeded by: Clarence J. Wohlwend

Member of the Missouri House of Representatives from the 106th district
- In office January 3, 1973 – January 5, 1983
- Preceded by: W. E. "Bill" Blackwell
- Succeeded by: Howard M. Garrett

Personal details
- Born: October 13, 1926 St. Louis County, Missouri
- Died: October 21, 2012 (aged 86) St. Louis, Missouri
- Party: Republican

Irene Treppler (October 13, 1926 – October 21, 2012) was an American politician who served in the Missouri House of Representatives from 1973 to 1985 and in the Missouri Senate from the 1st district from 1985 to 1997.

She died of complications from dementia on October 21, 2012, in St. Louis, Missouri at age 86.
