= Missouri's 1st Senate district =

American legislative district

Missouri's 1st State Senate district
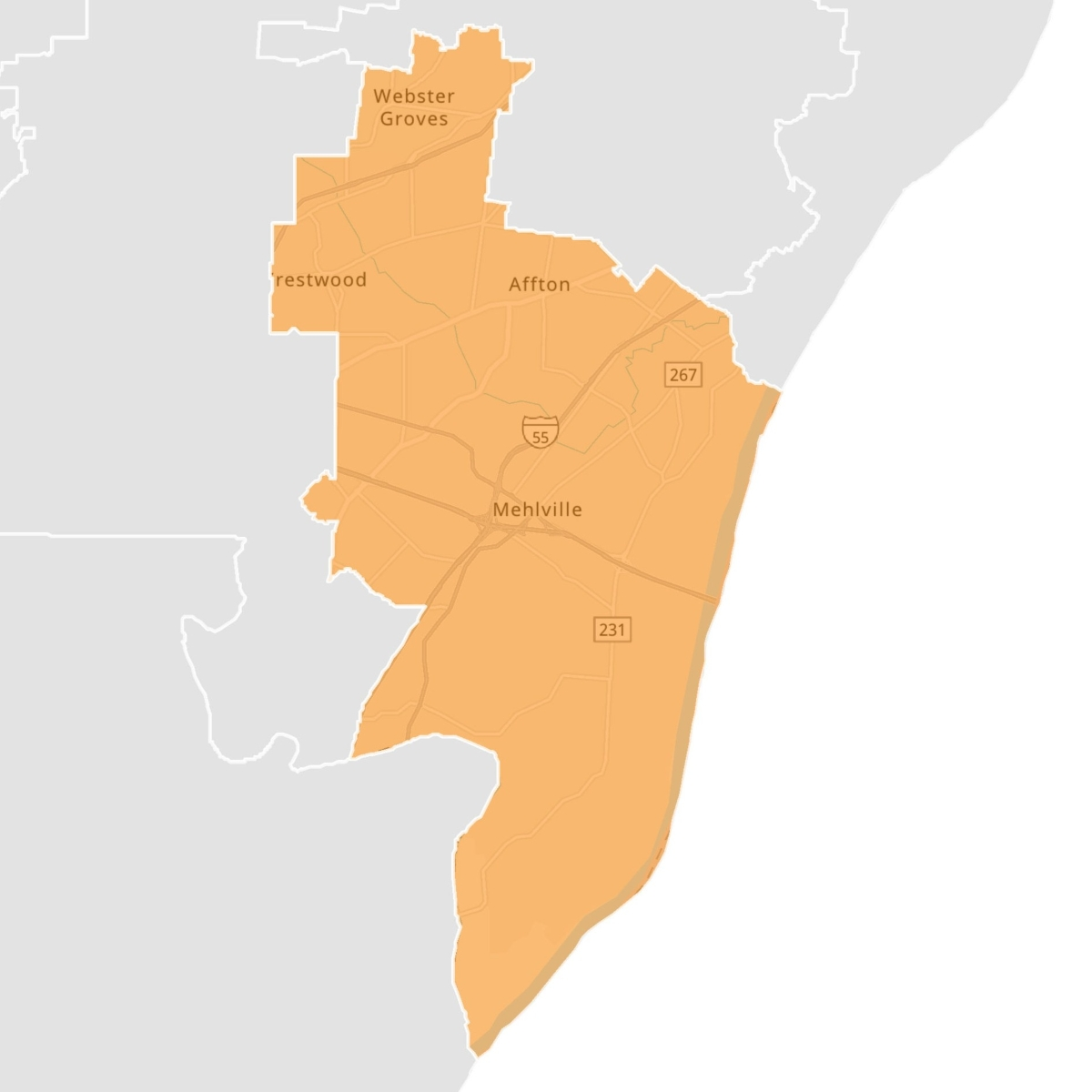
Senator
Doug Beck; D–Affton
- Demographics: 86% White; 3% Black; 3% Hispanic; 2% Asian; 5% Multiracial
- Population (2023): 180,760

Missouri's 1st Senatorial District is one of 34 districts in the Missouri Senate. Since 2021, the district has been represented by Democrat Doug Beck, who has served as Minority Floor Leader since 2024.

== Geography ==
The district is based in the St. Louis metropolitan area and lies within the southernmost portion of St. Louis County. Major municipalities in the district include Affton, Lemay, Mehlville, Oakville, and Webster Groves. The district is also home to Webster University.

== Election results (1996–2024) ==
=== 1996 ===
Missouri's 1st Senatorial District election (1996)
Party	Candidate	Votes	%
Republican	Anita T. Yeckel	42,364	56.01
Democratic	Gloria Weber	33,277	43.99
Total votes		75,641	100.00

=== 2000 ===
Missouri's 1st Senatorial District election (2000)
Party	Candidate	Votes	%
Republican	Anita T. Yeckel (incumbent)	49,828	62.43
Democratic	Greg Bailey	28,588	35.82
Libertarian	Walter S. Werner	1,404	1.76
Total votes		79,820	100.00
Republican hold			

=== 2004 ===
Missouri's 1st Senatorial District election (2004)
Party	Candidate	Votes	%
Democratic	Harry Kennedy	43,195	49.57
Republican	Bob Beckel	42,705	49.00
Libertarian	David Sladky	1,247	1.43
Total votes		87,147	100.00
Democratic gain from Republican			

=== 2008 ===
Missouri's 1st Senatorial District election (2008)
Party	Candidate	Votes	%
Republican	Jim Lembke	44,216	50.04
Democratic	Joan Barry	44,146	49.96
Total votes		88,362	100.00
Republican gain from Democratic			

=== 2012 ===
Missouri's 1st Senatorial District election (2012)
Party	Candidate	Votes	%
Democratic	Scott Sifton	45,689	50.91
Republican	Jim Lembke (incumbent)	44,055	49.09
Total votes		89,744	100.00
Democratic gain from Republican			

=== 2016 ===
Missouri's 1st Senatorial District election (2016)
Party	Candidate	Votes	%
Democratic	Scott Sifton (incumbent)	48,926	53.09
Republican	Randy Jotte	43,227	46.91
Total votes		92,153	100.00
Democratic hold			

=== 2020 ===
Missouri's 1st Senatorial District election (2020)
Party	Candidate	Votes	%
Democratic	Doug Beck	54,095	55.43
Republican	David Lenihan	43,495	44.57
Total votes		97,590	100.00
Democratic hold			

=== 2024 ===
Missouri's 1st Senatorial District election (2024)
Party	Candidate	Votes	%
Democratic	Doug Beck (incumbent)	53,263	56.15
Republican	Robert J. Crump	41,598	43.85
Total votes		94,861	100.00
Democratic hold			

== Statewide election results ==
Year	Office	Results
2008	President	Obama 51.6 – 46.5%
2012	President	Romney 51.7 – 48.3%
2016	President	Trump 48.3 – 46.3%
2016	Senate	Kander 54.3 – 42.1%
2016	Governor	Koster 52.5 – 44.7%
2018	Senate	McCaskill 55.7 – 41.9%
2020	President	Biden 52.9 – 45.4%
2020	Governor	Parson 51.6 – 46.5%
