= Jim Lembke =

American politician

Member of the Missouri Senate from the 1st district
- In office January 2009 – January 9, 2013
- Preceded by: Harry Kennedy
- Succeeded by: Scott Sifton

Member of the Missouri House of Representatives from the 85th district
- In office January 2003 – 2009

Personal details
- Born: July 24, 1961 (age 64) Chicago, Illinois, U.S.
- Party: Republican
- Spouse: Donna Lembke

James W. Lembke (born July 24, 1961) is an American Republican politician from Missouri. He served as a member of the Missouri House of Representatives from 2003 through 2009, representing the 85th district, and as a member of the Missouri Senate from 2009 to 2013, representing the 1st district.

In 2011, Lembke led a filibuster over the state accepting extended unemployment benefits from the federal government, effectively cutting off those benefits until an agreement cut state benefits to 20 weeks from 26 weeks. The move was criticized by both Democrats and Republicans, as the state was not required to pay anything for the extended benefits.

He was the only Republican representing a significant portion of St. Louis City in the state legislature. He was defeated by Democrat Scott Sifton in 2012.

== Personal life ==
Lembke was the business manager/development director at Providence Christian Academy. From 1987 to 1997 he was owner/partner of Savile Row. From 1982 to 1987 he was the owner of Christopher's Shoes. After his political career, he worked with United for Missouri, a tax policy organization. Lembke is an elder of Holy Trinity Anglican Church and former board chairman of Providence Christian Academy. He is a member of the South County Chamber; Lemay and Tesson Republican Organizations and was on the board of Sunshine Mission from 1990 to 1993. A 1979 graduate of Mehlville Senior High School, Sen. Lembke attended Meramec Community College and Covenant Theological Seminary. Lembke lives in St. Louis County, Missouri with his wife, Donna. They have two children, Anna and Mitchell.
