= Genise Montecillo =

American politician

Member of the Missouri House of Representatives from the 92nd district
- In office January 9, 2013 – January 4, 2017
- Preceded by: Sue Allen
- Succeeded by: Doug Beck

Member of the Missouri House of Representatives from the 66th district
- In office January 5, 2011 – January 9, 2013
- Preceded by: Michael Vogt
- Succeeded by: Tommie Pierson Sr.

Personal details
- Born: January 6, 1963 (age 63) Kirkwood, Missouri
- Party: Democratic

Genise Montecillo (born January 6, 1963) is an American politician who served in the Missouri House of Representatives from 2011 to 2017.
