= Anita Yeckel =

American politician (1942–2015)

Member of the Missouri Senate from the 1st district
- In office January 8, 1997 – January 5, 2005
- Preceded by: Irene Treppler
- Succeeded by: Harry Kennedy

Personal details
- Born: November 12, 1942 Salt Lake City, Utah
- Died: August 26, 2015 (aged 72) St. Louis, Missouri
- Party: Republican

Anita Yeckel (November 12, 1942 – August 26, 2015) was a Republican politician who served in the Missouri Senate for the 1st district, rising in seniority to the level of Assistant Majority Floor Leader. Born in Utah, she was first elected to the Missouri Senate in 1996 and served in office between 1997 through 2005. She graduated from the University of Missouri–St. Louis with a bachelor's of science degree in political science.

Yeckel sought the GOP nomination for State Treasurer of Missouri in 2004, but lost she lost to Sarah Steelman who won the general election. She had been campaign treasurer for her predecessor state Senator Irene Treppler, the first Republican woman elected to the Missouri Senate. In 1964, she married Bob Yeckel who sought to replace her in the Senate, but he lost to Democrat Harry Kennedy by about 700 votes.

She died of heart disease on August 26, 2015, in St. Louis, Missouri at age 72.
