= Progressive Change Campaign Committee =

US political organization

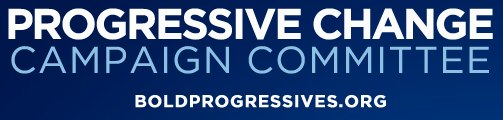
- Formation: 2009
- Members: 1,000,000+ (2012)
- Cofounders: Adam Green; Stephanie Taylor
- Website: boldprogressives.org

The Progressive Change Campaign Committee (PCCC) is an American political action committee (PAC) associated with the progressive movement. Founded in 2009, the PCCC invests in advocacy campaigns and progressive candidates running for office in the United States, at both the national and local level. The PCCC also operates a sister organization, called the Progressive Change Institute, which it describes as a "people-powered think tank".

== History ==
The PCCC was co-founded in 2009 by Adam Green and Stephanie Taylor. Aaron Swartz, Michael Snook and Forrest Brown were some of the organization's original employees. Spokespersons for the group have included Laura Friedenbach, Marissa Barrow, Giovanni Hashimoto and Neil Sroka. The PCCC claims to have nearly one million members and former MSNBC host Ed Schultz described it in 2012 as the "top progressive group in the country."

The PCCC is a major subject of The MoveOn Effect, a book published by the Oxford University Press authored by David Karpf.

=== 2016 presidential election ===
During the lead-up to the 2016 elections, the PCCC did not join other progressive groups in urging Warren to challenge Hillary Clinton for the Democratic nomination for president. Citing Warren's decision not to run, the PCCC instead urged candidates to adopt Warren's focus on economic populism, with a spokesperson saying it is "facilitating a race to the top on big Elizabeth Warren-style ideas". It stayed officially neutral in the Democratic primary but an aide to Clinton did meet with the head of the PCCC and the PCCC applauded her campaign's policy proposals.

=== 2020 presidential election ===
In 2020, PCCC co-founder Adam Green was a noted supporter of Elizabeth Warren's 2020 presidential campaign. During the 2020 Democratic primary campaign, the group formally lent its support to Warren's campaign. Following Warren's defeat, the organization announced a "Warren Power" project, designed to "build on the foundation laid" by Warren's campaign.

== Association with Elizabeth Warren ==
The organization is closely allied with Massachusetts Senator Elizabeth Warren. In 2011, the PCCC launched and led the draft campaign urging Warren to run for Senate and raised over $100,000 for her potential candidacy and recruited around 70,000 volunteers. The group organized several Draft Elizabeth Warren house parties across Massachusetts. Supporters met to discuss the best way to support her candidacy and campaign were she to announce that she was going to run.

In September 2011, after the demonstration of grassroots support, Warren announced she would run in 2012 against incumbent Republican Senator Scott Brown. With almost 50,000 individual contributions, the PCCC raised over $1.17 million and made over 500,000 get out the vote calls on her behalf. The campaign to draft Warren was declared "Most Valuable Campaign of 2011" by The Nation. In her 2014 memoir, A Fighting Chance, Warren writes that the "Progressive Change Campaign Committee signed on early with the petition encouraging me to run, and they stayed with me every day right through the election." Warren won the 2012 election and became the first female senator from Massachusetts.

Since her election, the PCCC has continued to work closely with Senator Warren through both her official and political offices. This has included joint endorsements of candidates and coordination on fundraising for supported candidates. The organization even coined the term, "Elizabeth Warren wing of the Democratic Party".

During the lead-up to the 2016 elections, many progressive groups began campaigns urging Warren to challenge Hillary Clinton for the Democratic nomination for president, but the PCCC was notably absent. Citing Warren's statements that she would not run, the PCCC instead urged Clinton and the other candidates to adopt Warren's focus on economic populism, with a spokesperson for the group saying they were "facilitating a race to the top on big Elizabeth Warren-style ideas". It has stayed officially neutral in the Democratic primary but an aide to Clinton did meet with the head of the PCCC and the PCCC has applauded her campaign's policy proposals.

== Electoral campaigns ==
In addition to Elizabeth Warren, the organization also lists Senators Mazie Hirono (D-HI), Al Franken (D-MN), Brian Schatz (D-HI), Jeff Merkley (D-OR), Tammy Baldwin (D-WI) and Sherrod Brown (D-OH) as candidates it has supported.

In the House of Representatives, they list Mike Honda (CA-17), Mark Takano (CA-41), Ruben Gallego (AR-07), Bonnie Watson Coleman (NJ-12), Alan Grayson (FL-09), Keith Ellison (MN-05), Rick Nolan (MN-08), Donna Edwards (MD-04), Raul Grijalva (AZ-03), Mark Pocan (WI-02), and Hakeem Jeffries (NY-08) among their candidates.

=== Bill Halter ===
In 2010, Arkansas Lieutenant Governor Bill Halter challenged the moderate Democratic incumbent United States Senator Blanche Lincoln in the primary. The PCCC helped Halter run a grassroots campaign that included a statewide field program. The group debuted their Call Out The Vote program and its members made tens of thousands of volunteer calls, as well as raising more than $250,000. Halter lost the race to Lincoln, who lost to John Boozman, her Republican challenger in the general election.

=== Wisconsin recall elections ===
The PCCC was involved in the Wisconsin recall election. In February 2011, over 180,000 PCCC supported the Wisconsin recall movement by raising over $2 million with Democracy for America to run television ads supporting the recall of Republican State Senators who had supported Republican Governor Scott Walker's Budget Repair Bill to limit collective bargaining rights for most Wisconsin state employees, excluding law enforcement agents. The ads won Pollies from the AAPC in 2012. They also used their Call Out The Vote program to make 382,623 calls in Wisconsin.

The second part of the campaign began in early 2012, with the formal recall procedures against Scott Walker underway. The PCCC supported Milwaukee Mayor Tom Barrett as the Democratic challenger to Walker. In June 2012, Walker won the recall by a larger margin than he had originally defeated Barrett in 2010.

== P Street Project and Progressive Change Institute ==
In July 2010, the progressive organization founded their own Congressional lobbying arm, P Street Project, to advance progressive policies from within Capitol Hill. The P Street Project victories include working with Representative Carolyn Maloney to organize a letter to President Obama asking him to nominate Elizabeth Warren for the Consumer Financial Protection Bureau. Representative Jared Polis said that the P Street Project could generate a tremendous amount of energy from the public and progressive members of Congress as well as provide resources and political cover for liberal lawmakers.

Other P Street successes include working with Representative Marcy Kaptur to deliver over 140,000 petitions to the U.S. Department of Justice demanding a criminal investigation into Goldman Sachs for its involvement in the 2008 financial crisis. The PCCC, through P Street, worked with Congressional Progressive Caucus Co-Chair Raul Grijalva to defend Social Security and Medicare during the debt ceiling crisis in 2011.

The PCCC also operates the Progressive Change Institute, which it describes as a "people-powered think tank".

== Advocacy campaigns ==
=== "Donate a Dollar a Day to Make Norm Go Away" ===
Following the 2008 Minnesota Senate election between Al Franken and Norm Coleman, the PCCC and DFA organized a campaign in which their members contributed one dollar each day that Coleman refused to concede defeat. Ultimately, Franken was the confirmed victor after a statewide recount. The organizations raised nearly $150,000 for progressive candidates.

=== Public option ===
In 2009, the PCCC began a campaign for a public option in the Affordable Care Act. Though initial support in Congress for a public option seemed weak, the organization gathered over 65,000 signatures from Obama’s 2008 supporters in favor of a public option. The PCCC raised over $100,000 in 72 hours for a full-page ad in The New York Times calling for a public option that included 400 Obama staffers as signatories, as well as 25,000 volunteers from Obama's 2008 campaign and 40,000 of his donors.

The Nation commended the group's efforts in reviving debate for the public option and their ability to organize within Congress to demonstrate the support that existed for it in Congress. The support included 120 Representatives and 24 Democratic Senators who signed letters asking Harry Reid to include a public option in the reconciliation bill.

The PCCC made it clear to that there was strong public support for a public option, and they were going to hold Democrats in Congress accountable if they turned a blind eye to the demands of their constituents and the American people. The group followed through when they ran an ad holding Senator Max Baucus (D-MT) accountable; Baucus later announced he would not be running for re-election. Baucus left the Senate on February 6, 2014, before his term expired and was succeeded by John E. Walsh.

In June 2012, when the Supreme Court handed down its ruling on the Affordable Care Act, the PCCC team and members were prepared outside the court. They demonstrated in large numbers and their posters calling for "Medicare for All" were prominent.

=== Net neutrality and SOPA ===
PCCC members continue to support major campaigns for net neutrality, advocating against censorship and supporting an open and accessible Internet. In 2010, the group launched GoogleDontBeEvil.com and helped deliver over 300,000 signatures to Google’s corporate headquarters, calling on them to honor their company motto, "Don’t be evil" as well as end their secret deal with Verizon to kill Net Neutrality. Over 100,000 of the organization's members signed a petition telling U.S. Federal Communications Commission Chairman Julius Genachowski to deliver on real Net Neutrality protections – instead of letting corporations write the rule. And, 95 Congressional candidates in the 2010 elections promised to protect Net Neutrality due to the PCCC's work. All lost in the 2010 mid-term elections.

The PCCC organized a massive campaign against the Stop Online Piracy Act bill the Senate was prepared to vote on. Working with Reddit, the group collected over 230,000 signatures petitioning Congress to protect internet innovation and vote against the bill.

=== Safety net ===
In January 2011, the PCCC delivered over 50,000 thank you notes written by its members to Senator Harry Reid after he took a stand against alleged proposals to cut Social Security benefits. PCCC challenged what they claimed were cuts to Social Security and Medicare. 200,000 PCCC members pledged not to volunteer or donate to Obama's re-election campaign if he cut benefits.

=== "Banxodus" ===
In November 2011, the PCCC started Banxodus, a website designed to help people move their money out of large banking institutions and into smaller, local credit unions and banks. The site uses crowdsourcing to provide more detailed information about both credit unions and community banks. Banxodus has more than 7,500 institutions in its database, which was created with the help of a few thousand volunteer researchers, and has grown as users add more information.

=== Movement to "Dump" ALEC ===
In April 2012, the PCCC initiated a campaign calling on major corporations to drop their support for the American Legislative Exchange Council (ALEC), which was blamed following the shooting of Trayvon Martin for reportedly having pushed the passage of "Stand Your Ground" laws in Florida as well as similar laws in 24 other states across the country.

The PCCC called on its members for their help to get major corporations to stop funding ALEC, and within days the PCCC had over 23,000 signatures, the Bill and Melinda Gates Foundation issued a statement indicating they would stop supporting ALEC, and McDonald's became the sixth corporation to drop their support of ALEC. Within weeks, Procter and Gamble also stopped their funding of ALEC, the PCCC organized to have its members call their state legislators demanding that they quit their membership to ALEC, and PCCC members called AT&T, State Farm, and Johnson & Johnson headquarters telling them to drop their support.

By July 2012, other corporations to stop funding ALEC include Amazon, Best Buy, Coca-Cola, CVS, Dell Computers, Hewlett-Packard, Kraft foods, MillerCoors, and Wal-Mart. 55 legislators have also cut their ties as well. ALEC later reported it was disbanding its task-forces that were charged with passing voter ID laws and Stand Your Ground laws.

=== Michigan House of Representatives ===
Michigan House Republicans prevented state representative Lisa Brown (D-Royal Oak) from speaking on the floor in a debate about abortion legislation after Brown said: "I'm flattered that you're all so interested in my vagina, but no means no." Brown was gaveled off the floor. Republican Jase Bolger, then serving as Speaker of the Michigan House stated that by referencing "vagina", and then saying "no means no", Brown was making a reference to rape which was inappropriate for legislative setting.

The PCCC promptly organized a campaign demanding Bolger and Stamas apologize to Brown and Barbara Byrum, who was also not allowed to speak that day. They garnered 115,000 signatures which Byrum delivered to Bolger. No apology was ever made.

== See also ==
- Political action committee
- Politics of the United States
- ActBlue
- Democracy for America
- MoveOn.org
- Our Revolution
