= John E. Scott =

American politician (born 1939)

John Scott

Member of the Missouri Senate from the 3rd district
- In office 1976–2001
- Succeeded by: Harry Kennedy

Personal details
- Born: July 24, 1939 (age 86) Charleston, Missouri
- Party: Democratic

John Escott (born July 24, 1939, in Charleston, Missouri) is a Democrat former state senator from Missouri where he served from 1976 until 2001.
