= Harry Kennedy (politician) =

American politician

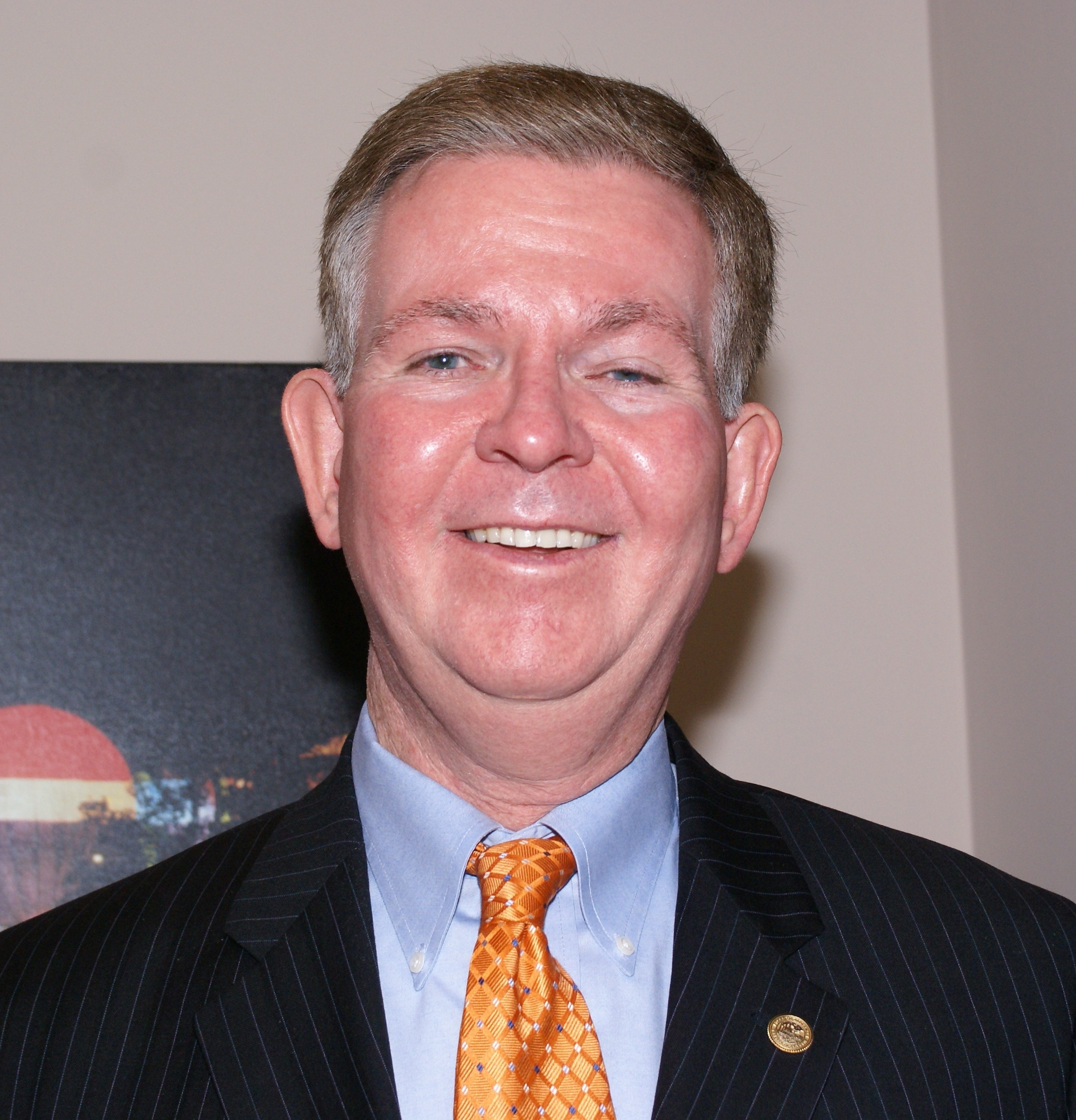

Member of the Missouri Senate from the 3rd district
- In office 2003–2005
- Preceded by: John E. Scott
- Succeeded by: Kevin Engler

Member of the Missouri Senate from the 1st district
- In office 2005–2008
- Preceded by: Anita Yeckel
- Succeeded by: Jim Lembke

Personal details
- Born: February 21, 1952 (age 74) St. Louis, Missouri
- Party: Democratic

Harry Kennedy (born February 21, 1952) is an American Democratic politician, who has been a member of the Missouri Senate and Missouri House of Representatives. He is currently a staffer for the St. Louis Board of Aldermen President Lewis Reed and a Democratic Committeeman for St. Louis' 14th Ward.

He graduated from the University of Missouri-St. Louis in 1984 with a Bachelor of Arts degree in speech communication. He is a member of the Catholic parish of St. Mary Margdalene in St. Louis.

Kennedy was a member of the Missouri House of Representatives from 1997 through 2001. He won election to the Missouri Senate from the third district in a special election in 2001. He was re-elected from the 1st district in 2004, changing districts due to re-districting. Kennedy would have been forced out of the Senate in 2009 due to term limits, but resigned in October 2008 to take his current position with Lewis Reed's office. During his Senate tenure, he was a member of the following Committees:

- Aging, Families, and Mental Health
- Economic Development, Tourism, and Local Government
- Financial and Governmental Organizations and Elections
- Pensions, Veteran's Affairs and General Laws

== See also ==
- List of current Missouri State Senators

== Sources ==
- Official Manual, State of Missouri, 2005-2006. Jefferson City, MO:Secretary of State.
