= Doug Beck =

American politician

Minority Leader of the Missouri Senate
- Incumbent
- Assumed office June 30, 2024
- Preceded by: John Rizzo

Member of the Missouri Senate from the 1st district
- Incumbent
- Assumed office January 6, 2021
- Preceded by: Scott Sifton

Member of the Missouri House of Representatives from the 92nd district
- In office January 6, 2017 – January 6, 2021
- Preceded by: Genise Montecillo
- Succeeded by: Michael Burton

Personal details
- Born: 1964 or 1965 (age 60–61) St. Louis, Missouri, U.S.
- Party: Democratic
- Children: 2
- Education: St. Louis Community College (attended)

Douglas Beck (born 1964/1965) is an American politician. He is a member of the Missouri Senate from the 1st district, serving since 2021. He previously represented the 92nd district in the Missouri House of Representatives from 2017 to 2021. He is a member of the Democratic Party. In the 2020 election cycle, he won the seat for Missouri Senate's 1st district, ascending from the Missouri House of Representatives and succeeding Scott Sifton.

== Missouri House of Representatives ==
During his time in the Missouri House of Representatives, in which he served from 2017 to 2021, he was the Ranking Member of the Economic Development and Workforce Development Committees and also served on the Veterans and Children and Families Committees.

== Missouri State Senate ==
Beck was elected in the 2020 Missouri State Senate elections, succeeding fellow Democrat Scott Sifton.

In 2025, Beck was one of the 4 Democrat senators to vote for state control of the St. Louis Metropolitan Police Department.

=== Committee assignments ===
- Agriculture, Food Production and Outdoor Resources
- Commerce, Consumer Protection, Energy and the Environment
- Economic Development
- Professional Registration
- Small Business and Industry
- Joint Committee on Public Employee Retirement
- Career and Technical Advisory Council
- Missouri Health Facilities Review Commission
- Missouri Palliative Care and Quality of Life Interdisciplinary Council

== Personal life ==
He was born and raised in St. Louis County, and graduated from Lindbergh High School in 1983. He attended St. Louis Community College. He has 2 children and 3 grandchildren.

== Electoral history ==
Missouri House of Representatives Election, November 8, 2016, District 92
Party	Candidate	Votes	%	±%
Democratic	Doug Beck	9,727	52.34%	
Republican	Daniel Bogle	8,857	47.66%	

Missouri House of Representatives Election, November 6, 2018, District 92
Party	Candidate	Votes	%	±%
Democratic	Doug Beck	10,081	59.63%	+7.29
Republican	Bill Heisse	6,826	40.37%	−7.29

Missouri Senate Election, November 3, 2020, District 1
Party	Candidate	Votes	%	±%
Democratic	Doug Beck	54,095	55.43%	
Republican	David Lenihan	43,495	44.57%	

Missouri Senate Election, November 5, 2024, District 1
Party	Candidate	Votes	%	±%
Democratic	Doug Beck	53,263	56.15%	
Republican	Robert Crump	41,598	43.85%	

Missouri Senate
Preceded by John Rizzo	Minority Leader of the Missouri Senate; 2024–present	Incumbent
