= Gary Romine =

American politician

Member of the Missouri Senate from the 3rd district
- In office 2013 – January 30, 2020
- Preceded by: Kevin P. Engler
- Succeeded by: Elaine Gannon

Personal details
- Born: 1955 or 1956 (age 70–71)
- Party: Republican
- Spouse(s): Kathy; five children
- Education: Three Rivers Community College; University of Central Missouri
- Occupation: Politician; Entrepreneur; Teacher

Gary Romine is an American entrepreneur, former Republican member of the Missouri Senate, and teacher. He represented the 3rd senatorial district, which includes Iron County, Reynolds County, St. Francois County, Ste. Genevieve County, Washington County and part of Jefferson County, from 2013 to 2020.

== Early life and career ==
Gary Romine graduated from Poplar Bluff High School, then went to Three Rivers Community College where he received an associate degree in applied sciences. He also received a Bachelor of Science in marketing and education from the University of Central Missouri. Later he taught in the Branson and Farmington school districts. After teaching, he went on to start his own business, Show-Me-Rent-To-Own. The company has grown from one store when he opened it to 9 stores today and is currently being sued for racial discrimination in the workplace, including a company policy of not renting to renters from majority black areas. He continues to serve as president and CEO of that company. He has served as chairman of the board of MRV Banks since it opened in 2007.

== Family ==
Gary Romine and his wife Kathy have five children.

== Political career ==
Gary Romine served as the chief of staff to state senators Bill Alter and Kevin P. Engler. He was legislative liaison for the Missouri Rental Dealers Association, president and public relations chairman of the Association of Progressive Rental Organizations, and a member of the Government Relations Committee of the Missouri Bankers Association. In 2004, Romine ran for an open seat in the Missouri House of Representatives. He lost in the Republican primary to Steven Tilley, who would later become Speaker of the Missouri House of Representatives. He is also a former president of the board of trustees of the Mineral Area College, an elected body.

In 2009, Romine declared his intention to run for the Missouri Senate. He eventually defeated Terry Varner in the Republican primary and state representative Joseph Fallert, Jr. in the general election for the 3rd district.

On April 2, 2013, Romine introduced an amendment to bill Missouri SB 712 that removed a section containing penalties for employers who fired victims of domestic violence requesting unpaid leave.

=== Committee assignments ===
- Education (Vice-Chairman)
- General Laws
- Jobs, Economic Development & Local Government
- Seniors, Families and Pensions
- Joint Committee on Education
- Joint Committee on Tax Increment Financing

== Electoral history ==
2016 General Election for Missouri's 3rd Senate District
Party	Candidate	Votes	%	±%
Republican	Gary Romine	54,414	81.25%	+27.41
Green	Edward R. Weissler	12,555	18.75%	+18.75

2012 General Election for Missouri’s 3rd Senate District
Party	Candidate	Votes	%	±%
Republican	Gary Romine	35,384	53.84%	
Democratic	Joseph Fallert, Jr.	30,335	46.16%	

2012 Primary Election for Missouri’s 3rd Senate District
Party	Candidate	Votes	%	±%
Republican	Gary Romine	8,258	66.92%	
Republican	Terry Varner	4,083	33.08%	

2004 Primary Election for Missouri’s 106th District House of Representatives
Party	Candidate	Votes	%	±%
Republican	Steven Tilley	2,600	57.7	
Republican	Gary Romine	1,904	42.3	
