= Stephanie Taylor (activist) =

American political activist, author

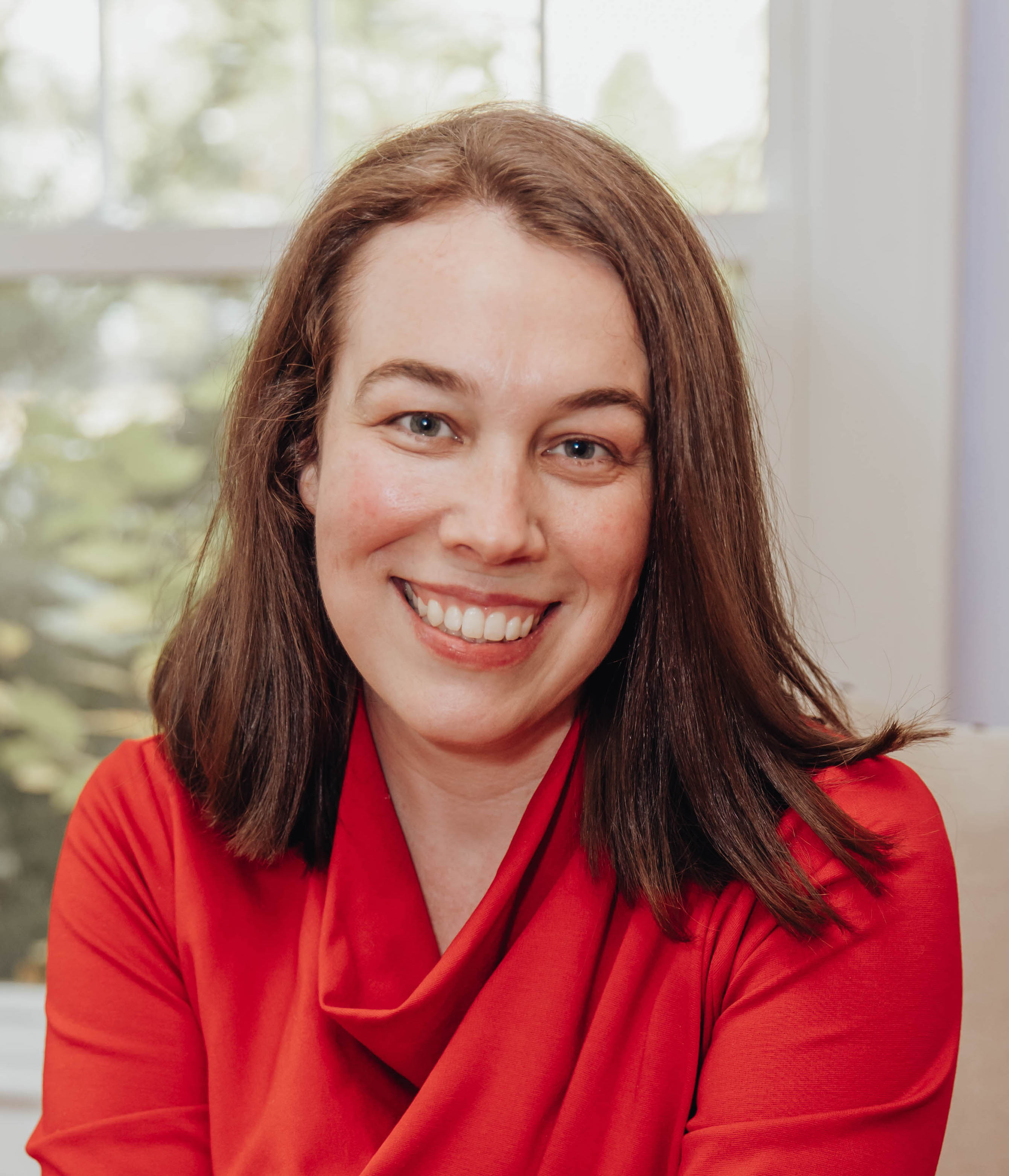
- Dr. Stephanie Taylor in 2020
- Born: Charlottesville, Virginia
- Education: University of Virginia; Columbia University; Georgetown University
- Occupations: Co-founder of the Progressive Change Campaign Committee, political activist, author
- Organization(s): Progressive Change Campaign Committee (co-founder), Progressive Change Institute (co-founder)
- Website: stephanietaylor.me

Stephanie Taylor is a political activist and author who is the co-founder of the Progressive Change Campaign Committee.

== Early life and education ==
Taylor grew up in Charlottesville, Virginia. Her mother was a medical secretary at the University of Virginia Medical Center, and was active in efforts to organize a union there in the 1990s. After college, Taylor worked as a union organizer in Appalachia. Taylor holds a BA from the University of Virginia, an MFA from Columbia University, and a PhD in American history from Georgetown University, where she wrote a dissertation about citizenship and the U.S. labor movement.

== Progressive Change Campaign Committee ==
Taylor co-founded the Progressive Change Campaign Committee in 2009. She vets and approves all organizational endorsements, which have included Elizabeth Warren, Pramila Jayapal, Katie Porter, Deb Haaland, Rashida Tlaib, Ilhan Omar, Jamie Raskin, Mondaire Jones, and Jamaal Bowman.

Taylor is the architect and director of PIES, a campaign-in-a-box platform for political candidates to autonomously build and host their own websites, manage their own email lists and fundraising programs, and design their own print-ready direct mail. She has created a training program for candidates, and written a number of guides for candidates and elected officials. Taylor describes the candidate support program as "a movement of progressive activists taking power at every level — local, state and federal."

She has also worked on campaigns for Social Security expansion, debt-free college, and government manufacturing of prescription drugs.

Taylor is a frequent contributor and commentator in the media, and has written for the New York Times, The Guardian, The Nation, American Prospect, Salon, and others.

=== Work with the Biden 2020 administration transition team ===
In November 2020, Taylor led a nationwide progressive effort to identify qualified public service personnel who could serve in a Biden administration. The effort culminated in the 400-person “Directory of Public Sector and Nonprofit Leadership".

== Books ==
In 2019, Taylor authored her first children's book, titled I Can Change Everything.
