= Kevin P. Engler =

American politician

Member of the Missouri House of Representatives from the 116th district
- In office 2013–2019
- Succeeded by: Dale Wright

Member of the Missouri Senate from the 3rd district
- In office 2005–2013
- Preceded by: Harry Kennedy
- Succeeded by: Gary Romine

Personal details
- Born: June 23, 1959 (age 67) Festus, Missouri, U.S.
- Party: Republican
- Spouse: Chris Engler

Kevin P. Engler (born June 23, 1959) is an American politician. As a Republican, he was elected St. Francois County Clerk in November 2018. He represented District 116 in the Missouri House of Representatives from January 2013 to January 2019. He previously represented District 3 in the Missouri Senate from 2005 to 2013, becoming Majority leader in January 2009. He was also a member of the Missouri House of Representatives from 2003 through 2005.

== Background ==
Engler was born in Festus, Missouri, and graduated from Festus High School in 1977. He went on to Southwest Missouri State University, where he earned degrees in finance/general business and marketing. He served as mayor of Farmington for six years, was elected to the Missouri House of Representatives in 2002, and then to the Missouri State Senate in 2004 and again to the Missouri House of Representatives in 2012.

In 2009, Engler attracted attention by proposing, then withdrawing a bill to make littering a capital offense. In a short speech on the Senate floor, he referred to constituents who litter as "white trash" and "dumb rednecks." When criticized for these remarks, Engler said, "the only ones I've called names are the ones doing it. If they are offended, good."

== Personal life ==
He is married to Chris Engler, with whom he has four children. He currently resides in Farmington, Missouri and is a former registered representative of Edward Jones Investments.
