= Broligarchy =

A society controlled by tech bros

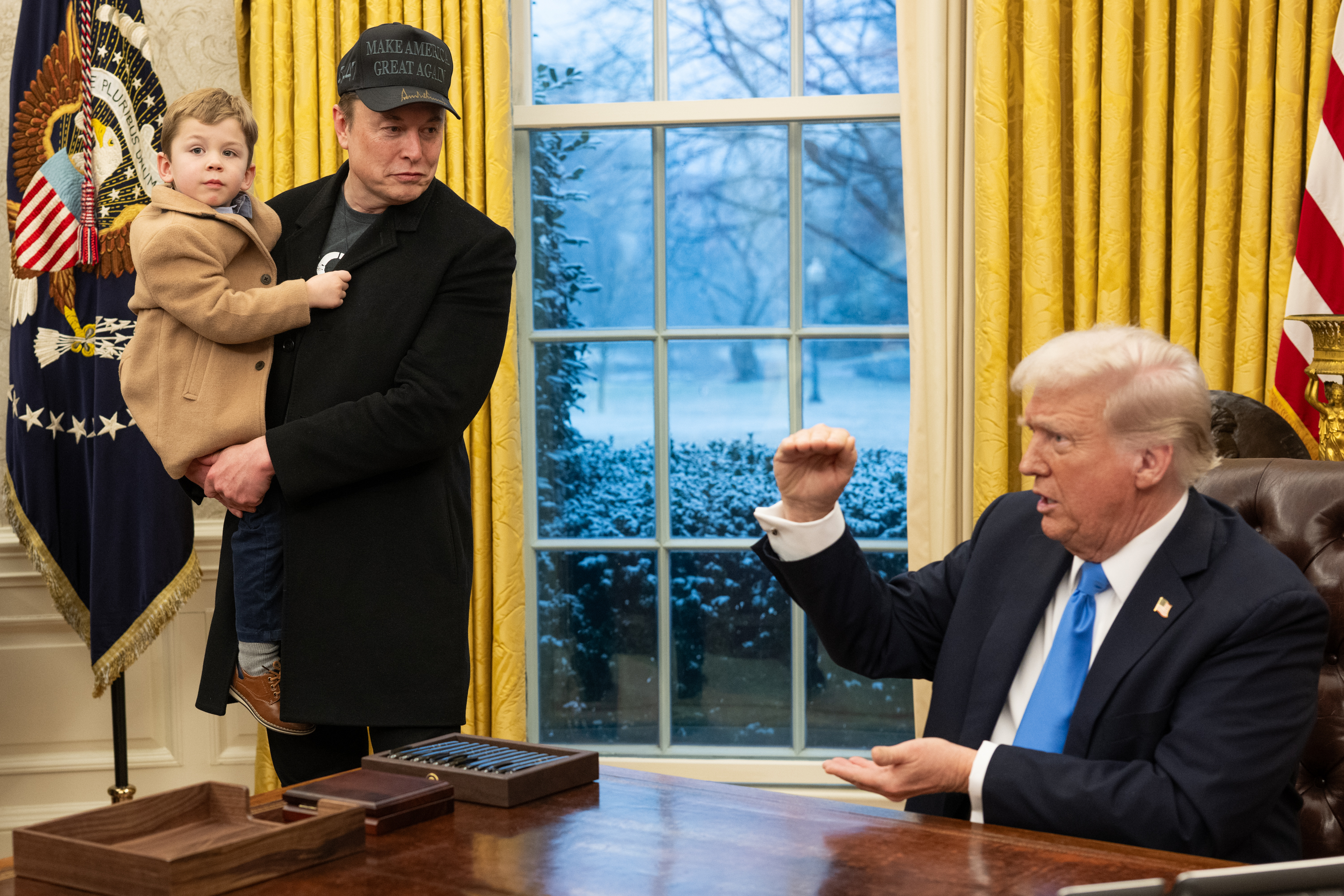
Elon Musk and one of his children in the Oval Office with President Donald Trump in February 2025

"Broligarchy" is a slang term for a type of governance where billionaire "tech bros" control society. A broligarchy is a subgenre of an oligarchy. The men hold leadership roles in big tech while simultaneously reigning control over how the country is governed. The broligarchy is also known as tech oligarchy, and is closely related to technofeudalism.

Broligarchy is a neologism and portmanteau combining oligarchy and bro culture.

== Origin of the term ==
According to Prospect magazine, "Broligarchy appears in surfer language in the early 2000s “when a small group of bros run a break”—referring to locals controlling a surf spot." The modern use of the terms broligarch and broligarchy can be traced to a Twitter post in 2009. Broligarchy appeared on Urban Dictionary in 2011. The terms gained wide adoption on social media during the 2024 US presidential election and the second Trump presidency.

The term broligarch was first used in the mainstream media in late July 2024 in a news article in The Observer by the British journalist Carole Cadwalladr.

In early August 2024, the term broligarch appeared in the title of articles in the Atlantic magazine by Brooke Harrington and in the English edition of Al Majalla by Bryn Haworth. The subsequent months saw a flurry of media usage following the 2024 US presidential election in November of the same year and the second inauguration of Donald Trump in January 2025.

Since August 2025, the words broligarch and broligarchy have been officially included in the Cambridge Dictionary.

== Historical developments ==
In the 2021 book The Tyranny of Big Tech, Republican Party politician and senior United States Senate member of Missouri Josh Hawley argued that major technology companies like Google, Facebook, Amazon, and Apple have become tech oligarchs with overwhelming economic and political power. He describes these companies as modern-day robber barons who are draining prosperity and power from the middle class and creating a new oligarchy. Critics claimed that Hawley's book contained factual errors and accused him of using the book as a launching pad for his own political career.
