= Manhood: The Masculine Virtues America Needs =

2023 book by Josh Hawley

- Author: Josh Hawley
- Genre: Christian literature, political science
- Publisher: Regnery
- Publication date: May 16, 2023
- Pages: 256
- ISBN: 9781684513574

Manhood: The Masculine Virtues America Needs is a book by American senator Josh Hawley. It was published by American conservative publisher Regnery Publishing on May 16, 2023. Manhood extensively draws on the Bible to argue a version of masculinity as a form of self-improvement. It was panned by critics but praised by conservative commentators prior to its release. Versions of the book, including the audiobook, charted in various sections on Amazon's best sellers list.

== Background ==
Josh Hawley is an American politician and lawyer. Hawley released Manhood while the senior United States senator from Missouri. Hawley previously was the 42nd attorney general of Missouri from 2017 to 2019. Hawley attended Yale Law School, graduating in 2006 with a Juris Doctor degree. The Kansas City Star reported that Hawley's classmates saw him as "politically ambitious and a deeply religious conservative." Hawley has written for the magazine Christianity Today. Hawley has previously been described as a Christian nationalist for views he gives in remarks and speeches. Manhood is the third book authored by Hawley and second published by Regnery Publishing, after The Tyranny of Big Tech, both of which were published during Hawley's time as a senator. The Tyranny of Big Tech was originally supposed to be published by Simon & Schuster before they dropped the book following Hawley's support of the storming of the United States Capitol.

== Synopsis ==
Josh Hawley opens Manhood: The Masculine Virtues America Needs by describing how he became aware of the problems he identifies as facing men and the reasons he suspects to be the root cause of those issues. Hawley says he first identified the alleged problem while he was an associate professor at University of Missouri Law School and had conversations with male students. In Manhood, Hawley suggests the increased cost of living, unemployment and housing to be the root causes of male unhappiness. Hawley also identifies gender-based discrepancies in male education performance and suggests inaction, or "not trying" (Note: Hawley 2023, chapt. 1) as both the reason for male under-performance, and the cause of unhappiness. Hawley argues "screens, leisure, and porn" are the issues that end up causing discontent. He also argues that the American left have driven the collapse of masculinity and suggests that marriage is required for men to "grow up". (Note: Hawley 2023, chapt. 5, 6, 10) Hawley frequently blames "fatherlessness" (Note: Hawley 2023, pp. 7, 9, 90–92, 209) for many problems in modern American society including drug use, poverty, and crime. He also blames the American welfare state for what he terms a "dependency" (Note: Hawley 2023, p. 131) problem preventing men from choosing to find work, something he argues as intrinsic to his version of manhood.

In Manhood, Hawley extensively draws on the Bible to develop an idea of manhood. He states that the Bible is the foundation for Western civilization and claims that American politicians are not able to discuss or acknowledge the Bible. He then discusses masculinity through the lens of the Bible, including figures such as Adam, Abraham, David, and Jesus. He frequently draws similarities between the Bible and Ancient Egyptian religion and Roman culture. Throughout Manhood, Hawley variously either praises Ancient Greek culture or blames it, particularly Epicureanism, as the origin for modern liberalism. He views his version of manhood as directly contrary to atheism and nihilism.

Hawley dispels the notion of masculinity promoted by the 1999 film Fight Club and social media personality Andrew Tate. He vehemently opposes pornography and likens it to cheap sex. He blames porn consumption, or "usage", as the cause for many problems facing men, and suggests it is an extreme form of consumerism. Hawley says for men to be happy, they must practice self restraint. In addition to porn, Hawley also blames video games for modern male loneliness. In Manhood, Hawley attacks the American Psychological Association and argues that their guidelines discourage traditional male characteristics. (Note: Hawley 2023, pp. 50, 109–110) Hawley contends that traditionally masculine characteristics are eliminated in boys in what he views as the over diagnosis or overmedication of boys with ADHD. (Note: Hawley 2023, pp. 109–110)

Hawley describes how he developed his ideals of manhood during his childhood while helping his grandfather, a farmer in Missouri, and combines work with self worth. Hawley says "To become a man, you must work. You must contribute. You must give more than you take." (Note: Hawley 2023, p. 135) Hawley dedicates a portion of a chapter to telling a coming of age story passed down from the family of his wife, Erin Hawley. (Note: Hawley 2023, chapt. 7) In it, he describes how a grandmother and her son turned in an outlaw "Captain William Coe". Hawley uses the story as an allegory to show how the son, in demonstrating bravery and courage, grew into Hawley's version of a man. He also discusses his children and his son's health issues, growing up around his grandparents, playing youth sports, social and Bible study clubs, marriage and his wife, their miscarriage, his time as a clerk for the Supreme Court, and his time as a rowing coach, and how those experiences contributed to his view of masculinity.

== Development ==
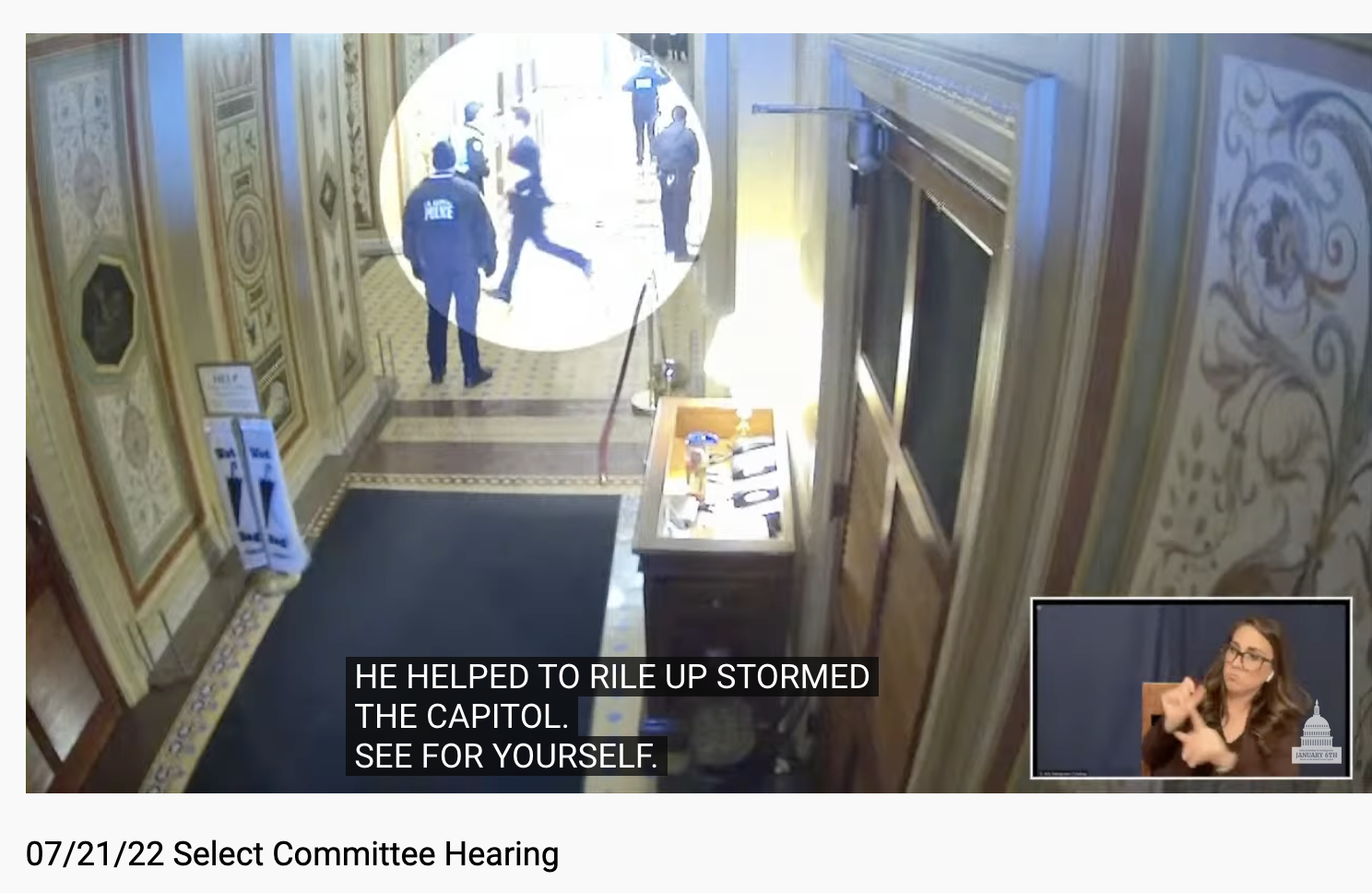
Video of Hawley running from the Capitol on January 6th was widely discussed before the release of Manhood.

Hawley had previously discussed how his political philosophy had been shaped by studying Theodore Roosevelt, particularly in regard to religion and masculinity. Hawley authored a book in 2007 on Roosevelt. It was announced in early 2022 that Senator Hawley was writing a book on the topic of manhood. The book was supposed to expand on a speech at the National Conservatism Conference delivered by Hawley where he claimed the political left was waging a war on masculinity. Hawley did not disclose the size of advance he was paid to write Manhood.

Before publication, Regnery Publishing did not widely circulate advance copies of the book, instead limiting to whom they provided early versions. Conservative commentators who received an early copy praised the work. Stephen Lyons, in a pre-publication review for The Independent, said Hawley had "seminal courage" in writing Manhood. Lyons praised Hawley and "alpha male Senator Ted Cruz" for their role contesting the "rigged election of President Biden." Other pre-publication reviews expressed disappointment that Hawley did not address his role in the 2021 insurrection; Hawley had previously conducted fundraising based on a widely circulate image of him raising his fist in support during the insurrection.

Promotion of his book coincided with raised scrutiny of Hawley and his role in the insurrection. He faced particular scrutiny as a result of the ongoing House Select Committee on the January 6 Attack; commentators compared Hawley's previous stances on manhood with video of him fleeing the Capitol. Hawley responded to criticism to CNN saying "[t]his is just an attempt to troll." Ursula Perano of The Daily Beast said that critics were trying to tank sales of Manhood prior to its release.

== Reception ==
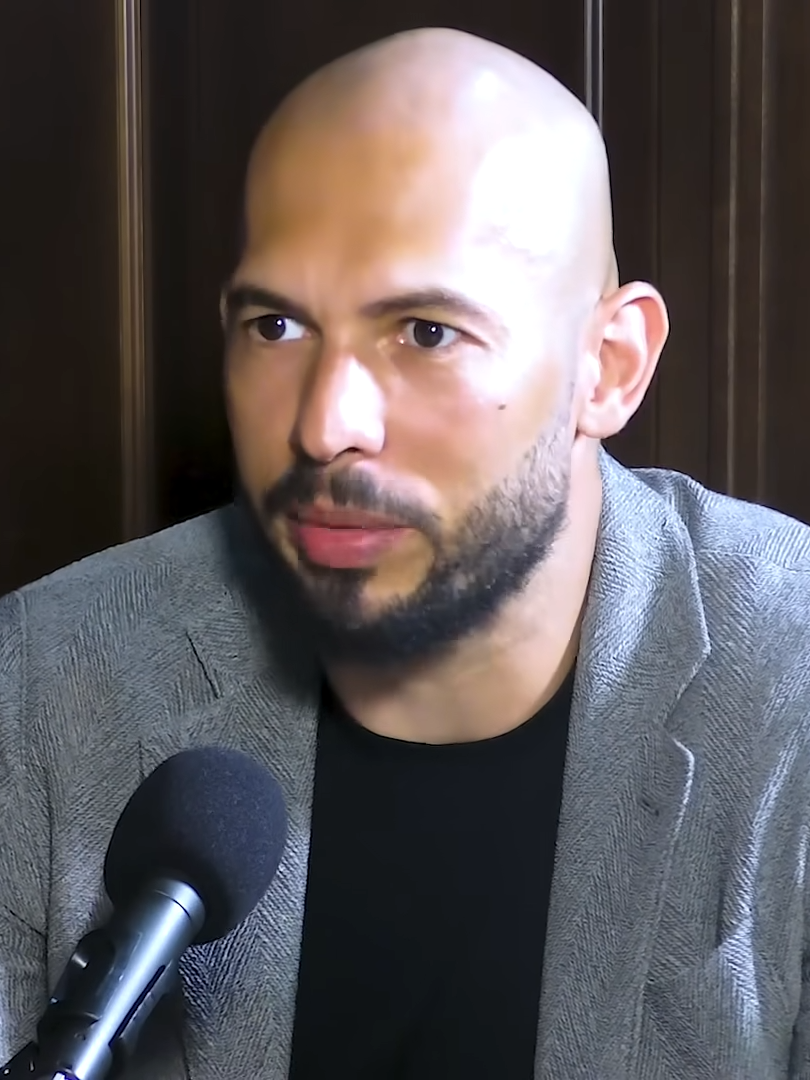
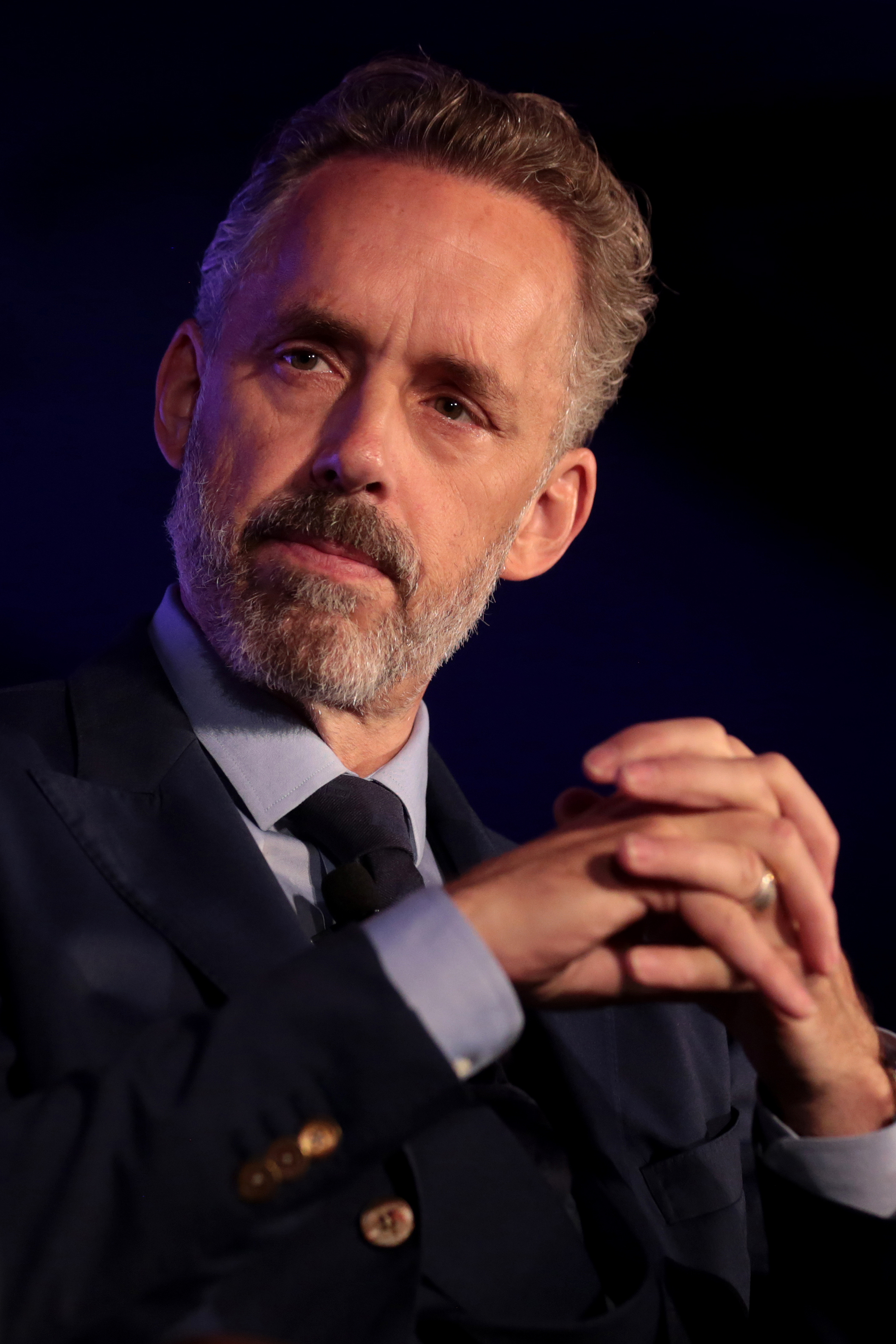
In Manhood, Hawley critiques a version of masculinity espoused by Andrew Tate, but commentators have likened his politics to Tate's, and compared Hawley's brand of masculinity to that of Jordan Peterson.

Manhood was listed as a best seller on Amazon in the "Men's Christian Living" (Kindle and audiobook formats) and "Political Conservatism & Liberalism" (hardcover) sections. Hawley attempts to separate the ideas he puts forth in Manhood from those espoused by Andrew Tate. Despite this, political commentators and lawyers such as Kate Shaw, Melissa Murray and Jonathan Van Ness likened Hawley and the ideas in Manhood to Andrew Tate. Lloyd Green of The Guardian felt the book was hypocritical for dispelling Tate's version of manhood while overlooking the Donald Trump Access Hollywood tape. Rebecca Onion, writing for Slate, compares Hawley's vision of manliness to Jordan Peterson's, often described as just "clean your room" accountability.

Becca Rothfeld, in her review for The Washington Post, says that Hawley tries to write "a gender rule book" that is in "the awkward position of claiming that masculinity is both unassailable and endangered, both natural enough to be obvious and fragile enough to require defense." Soraya Chemaly, writing for MSNBC, described Manhood as "a thorough roadmap to how the senator thinks about his brand of hyperconservative Christian, largely white masculinity and what he perceives as its crisis." Ginny Hogan, writing for The Nation, says that while Hawley is correct in identifying there are modern issues facing men, he "wildly misses the mark" in identifying those issues and urges that no one should read this book. Lucas Kunce, a politician who ran against Hawley in for the Senate in 2024, said to The Daily Beast, "it's strange that Josh is writing a book on a topic he has zero experience with."
