= Teresa Hensley =

American lawyer

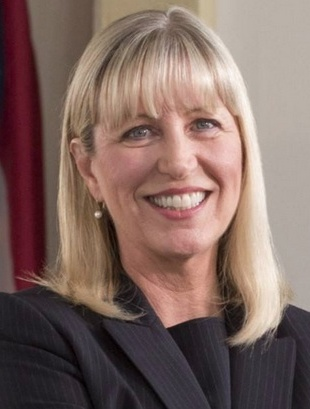

Prosecuting Attorney for Cass County
- In office January 6, 2005 – January 2, 2015
- Preceded by: Chris Koster
- Succeeded by: Ben Butler

Personal details
- Born: 1959; Lake Winnebago, Missouri, U.S.
- Political party: Democratic
- Spouse: Kenneth Hensley
- Education: University of Missouri–Kansas City School of Law

Teresa L. Hensley (born 1959) is an American lawyer who is the former prosecuting attorney for Cass County, Missouri. She was the unsuccessful Democratic Party nominee for Missouri's 4th congressional district in 2012 and for Missouri Attorney General in 2016.

== Law career ==
Hensley earned her Juris Doctor degree from the University of Missouri–Kansas City School of Law, before teaching a criminal-law class at William Jewell College. Hensley joined the private sector in 1991 and was partner in the law firm Hensley and Hensley along with her husband, Kenneth.

In December 2004, Governor Bob Holden appointed Hensley to be Cass County prosecutor following the resignation of incumbent Chris Koster, who had just won a seat in the state senate. She took office on January 6, 2005, and won a full term in 2006, defeating Republican Jeffrey Cox. She was reelected without opposition in 2010. Hensley lost her 2014 reelection bid to Republican Ben Butler by a margin of 6 points.

== Political campaigns ==
Hensley first ran for office in 2002 for the Missouri House of Representatives in the 123rd District. She ran on a campaign of increasing teacher pay, shrinking classroom sizes, and hiring more teachers. She narrowly lost the election to Republican Brian Baker.

In 2012, Hensley ran to represent Missouri's 4th congressional district in the U.S. House of Representatives. She lost by a margin of 25 points to incumbent Republican Vicky Hartzler.

Hensley ran for Missouri Attorney General in 2016. Despite her past losses, she claimed she had a better chance of winning a statewide election. She ended up losing the election to Republican Josh Hawley.
