= Josh Hawley =

American lawyer and politician (born 1979)

- Official portrait, 2019

United States Senator from Missouri
- Incumbent
- Assumed office January 3, 2019 Serving with Eric Schmitt
- Preceded by: Claire McCaskill

42nd Attorney General of Missouri
- In office January 9, 2017 – January 3, 2019
- Governor: Eric Greitens; Mike Parson
- Preceded by: Chris Koster
- Succeeded by: Eric Schmitt

Personal details
- Born: Joshua David Hawley; December 31, 1979 (age 46) Springdale, Arkansas, U.S.
- Party: Republican
- Spouse: Erin Morrow (m. 2010)
- Children: 3
- Education: Stanford University (BA); Yale University (JD)
- Website: Senate website Campaign website
- Hawley's voice Hawley opposing the Journalism Competition and Preservation Act of 2021; Recorded February 15, 2023

Joshua David Hawley (born December 31, 1979) is an American politician and attorney serving as the senior United States senator from Missouri, a seat he has held since 2019. A member of the Republican Party, Hawley served as the 42nd attorney general of Missouri from 2017 to 2019, before defeating two-term incumbent Democratic senator Claire McCaskill in the 2018 election. He was reelected in 2024.

Born in Springdale, Arkansas, to a banker and a teacher, Hawley graduated from Stanford University in 2002 and Yale Law School in 2006. After being a law clerk to Judge Michael W. McConnell and Chief Justice John Roberts, he worked as a lawyer, first in private practice from 2008 to 2011 and then for the Becket Fund for Religious Liberty from 2011 to 2015. Before being elected Missouri attorney general, he was also an associate professor at the University of Missouri School of Law, and a faculty member of the conservative Blackstone Legal Fellowship.

As Missouri attorney general, Hawley initiated several high-profile lawsuits and investigations, including a lawsuit against the Affordable Care Act, an investigation into Missouri governor Eric Greitens, and a lawsuit and investigation into companies associated with the opioid epidemic. His political beliefs have been described as populist and socially conservative.

In December 2020, Hawley became the first senator to announce plans to object to the certification of Joe Biden's victory in the 2020 United States presidential election. He led efforts in the Senate to do so.

== Early life and education ==
Joshua David Hawley was born on December 31, 1979, in Springdale, Arkansas, to banker Ronald Hawley and teacher Virginia Hawley. In 1981, the Hawleys moved to Lexington, Missouri, after Ronald joined a division of Boatmen's Bancshares there.

Hawley attended Lexington Middle School and Rockhurst High School, a private Jesuit boys' prep school in Kansas City, Missouri. He graduated in 1998 as a valedictorian. According to his middle school principal, Barbara Weibling, several of Hawley's teachers thought "he was probably going to be president one day." While in high school, Hawley regularly wrote columns for his hometown newspaper, The Lexington News, about such topics as the American militia movement following the Oklahoma City bombing, media coverage of Los Angeles Police Department detective Mark Fuhrman, and affirmative action, which he opposed.

Hawley studied history at Stanford University, where his mother was an alumna. He graduated in 2002 with a Bachelor of Arts degree with highest honors and Phi Beta Kappa membership. He studied under professor David M. Kennedy, who later contributed the foreword to Hawley's book Theodore Roosevelt: Preacher of Righteousness. Kennedy said Hawley stood out in a school "which is overstuffed with overachieving and very talented young people" and called him "arguably the most gifted student I taught in 50 years".

In the summer of 2000, Hawley was an intern at The Heritage Foundation, a conservative think tank. After spending ten months in London teaching at St Paul's School from 2002 to 2003, Hawley returned to the U.S. to attend Yale Law School, graduating in 2006 with a Juris Doctor degree. The Kansas City Star reported that Hawley's classmates regarded him as "politically ambitious and a deeply religious conservative". At Yale, Hawley was articles editor of the Yale Law Journal, editor of the Yale Law & Policy Review, and president of the school's Federalist Society chapter.

== Early career ==
Hawley spent two years as a law clerk after law school, clerking first for Judge Michael W. McConnell of the U.S. Court of Appeals for the Tenth Circuit from 2006 to 2007, then for Chief Justice John Roberts of the U.S. Supreme Court from 2007 to 2008. While at the Supreme Court, Hawley met his future wife, Erin Morrow, now known as Erin Hawley, a fellow Yale Law graduate who was also clerking for Roberts.

After his clerkships, Hawley worked in private practice as an appellate litigator at the law firm Hogan & Hartson (now Hogan Lovells) from 2008 to 2011. In 2011, Hawley returned to Missouri and became an associate professor at the University of Missouri Law School, where he taught constitutional law, constitutional theory, legislation, and torts. From 2011 to 2015 Hawley was with Becket Fund for Religious Liberty. At Becket, he wrote briefs and gave legal advice in the Supreme Court cases Hosanna-Tabor Evangelical Lutheran Church & School v. Equal Employment Opportunity Commission, decided in 2012, and Burwell v. Hobby Lobby, decided in 2014.

=== 2016 Missouri attorney general campaign ===
Hawley launched his campaign for attorney general of Missouri on July 23, 2015. Of the $9.2 million raised for the campaign, $4.4 million was provided by David Humphreys, CEO of Joplin-based Tamko Building Products. On August 2, 2016, Hawley defeated Kurt Schaefer in the Republican primary with 64% of the vote. He defeated Democrat Teresa Hensley in the general election with 58.5% of the vote. During the campaign, Hawley criticized "career politicians" who were "climbing the ladder" from one position to another. This was later a focus of bipartisan criticism of him because he ran for the U.S. Senate only two years later. When elected, Hawley became the state's first Republican attorney general since 1988.

== Attorney general of Missouri (2017–2019) ==
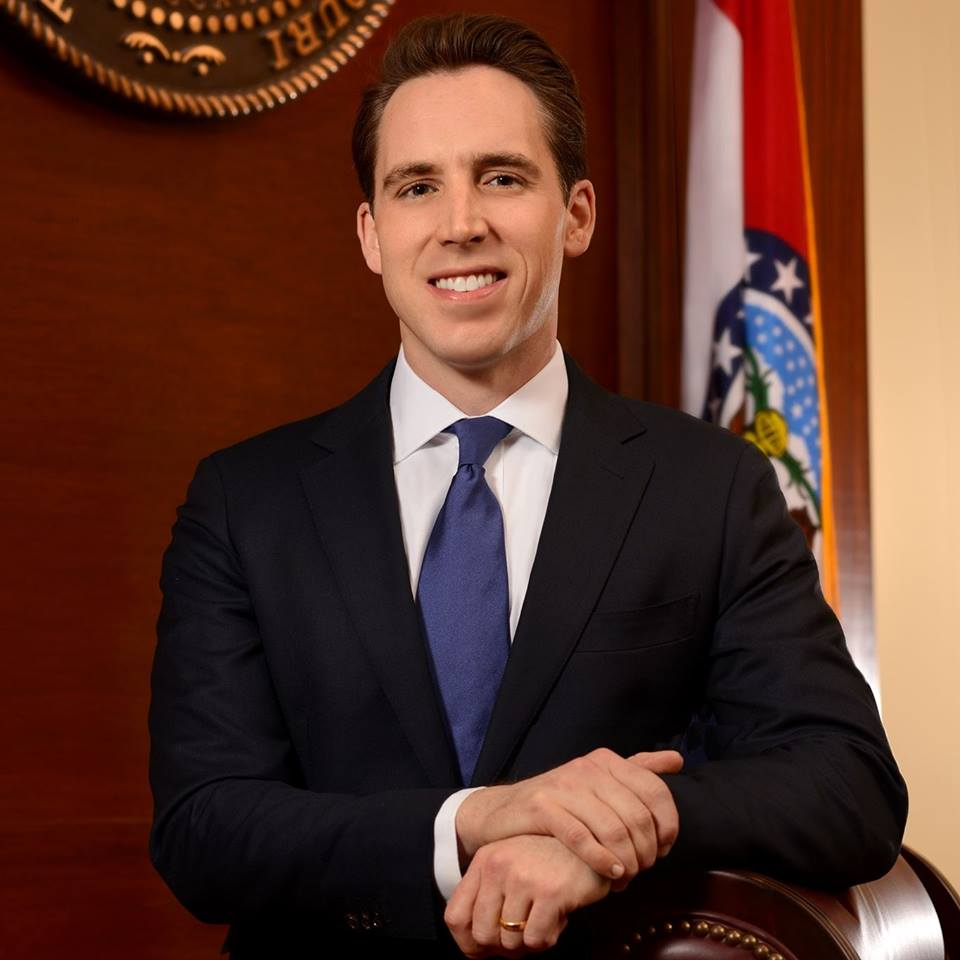
Hawley as attorney general in 2017

Hawley was sworn in as attorney general on January 9, 2017, by Missouri Supreme Court chief justice Patricia Breckenridge.

=== Death of Tory Sanders ===
On May 5, 2017, Tory Sanders, a Black motorist who had taken a wrong turn in Tennessee, ran out of gas in rural Mississippi County, Missouri. He had gotten lost and was confused; he asked a gas station attendant to call the police for assistance. Deputies responded and put him in protective custody in the county jail. His mental condition deteriorated further and he resisted when they tried to move him to a medical facility. Sheriff Cory Hutcheson led jail staff who repeatedly pepper-sprayed and Tasered Sanders throughout the day. Hutcheson eventually led a team of cops and jailers into the cell and swarmed Sanders, who went into cardiac arrest and died.

In an unrelated case, Hutcheson pleaded guilty and was sentenced in 2019 to six months in federal prison for unrelated crimes: wire fraud and identity theft related to illegal tracking of some 200 private cellphone users. He resigned after his plea and can no longer work as a law enforcement officer.

In 2017 Hawley determined that those who had assaulted Sanders had not intended his death, and did not file murder charges. Black lawmakers and the NAACP's Missouri chapter criticized Hawley for his handling of Sanders's death and failure to prosecute, believing he did not find justice for Sanders. No one could be held criminally accountable for Sanders's death.

Following the murder of George Floyd while in custody of Minneapolis police in 2020, interest in Sanders's case revived. Activists hoped that Eric Schmitt, the new state attorney general, would file charges. In February 2021, he chose not to do so. The three-year statute of limitations had expired for manslaughter, and he said he believed there was insufficient evidence to support charges of first- or second-degree murder.

=== Opioid manufacturer lawsuit and investigation ===
In June 2017, Hawley announced that Missouri had filed suit in state court against three major drug companies—Endo Health Solutions, Janssen Pharmaceuticals, and Purdue Pharma—for allegedly hiding the danger of prescription painkillers and contributing to the opioid epidemic. The state argued that the companies violated Missouri consumer protection and Medicaid laws. The damages sought were among the largest in state history, on the order of hundreds of millions of dollars.

In August 2017, Hawley announced that he had opened an investigation into seven opioid distributors: Allergan, Depomed, Insys, Mallinckrodt, Mylan, Pfizer, and Teva Pharmaceuticals. In October 2017, he expanded his investigation into three additional pharmaceutical companies—AmerisourceBergen, Cardinal Health, and McKesson Corporation—that are the three largest U.S. opioid distributors.

=== Rape kit audit ===
On October 29, 2017, the Columbia Missourian published an exposé describing a large backlog of untested rape kits in Missouri and the state's failure to address the backlog, although rape survivors and law enforcement agencies had urged such actions. On November 29, Hawley announced a statewide audit of the number of untested rape kits. The results were made public in May 2018; there were nearly 5,000 such kits. In August 2018, One Nation, a 501(c)(4) nonprofit connected to Republican campaign strategist Karl Rove, ran commercials giving Hawley credit for identifying the problem, a claim The St. Louis Post-Dispatch labeled misleading, because he had been responding to issues raised by law enforcement, survivors and advocates, rather than originating an investigation.

In September 2020, his successor, Missouri Attorney General Eric Schmitt, announced that of the 16 rape kit tests that were consequently uploaded to the national DNA database, 11 revealed the names of known criminals, and were referred for possible prosecution.

=== Investigations into tech companies ===
In November 2017, Hawley opened an investigation into whether Google's business practices violated state consumer protection and anti-trust laws. The investigation was focused on what data Google collects from users of its services, how it uses content providers' content, and whether its search engine results are biased.

In April 2018, after the Facebook–Cambridge Analytica data scandal, Hawley announced that his office had issued a subpoena to Facebook related to how the company shares its users' data. The investigation sought to determine whether Facebook properly handles its users' sensitive data or collects more data than it publicly admits.

=== Greitens scandals ===
In December 2017, The Kansas City Star reported that Missouri's Republican Governor Eric Greitens and senior members of his staff used Confide, a messaging app that erases texts after they have been read, on their personal phones. They were accused by government transparency advocates of subverting Missouri's open records laws. Hawley initially declined to prosecute, citing a Missouri Supreme Court ruling that the attorney general cannot simultaneously represent a state officer and take legal action against that officer. On December 20, 2017, he announced his office would investigate after all, saying that his clients are "first and foremost the citizens of the state".

Hawley said text messages between government employees, whether on private or government-issued phones, should be treated the same as emails: a determination must be made as to whether the text is a public record, and if so, whether it is subject to disclosure. His investigation found that no laws had been broken. In March 2018, six former Missouri attorneys released a letter criticizing the investigation as "half-hearted". Hawley's spokesperson called the letter a partisan attack.

When allegations emerged in January 2018 that Greitens had blackmailed a woman with whom he was having an affair, Hawley's office said it did not have jurisdiction to look into the matter. St. Louis circuit attorney Kimberly Gardner opened an investigation into the allegations. In April, after a special investigative committee of the Missouri House of Representatives released a report on the allegations, Hawley called on Greitens to resign immediately. The next week, Gardner filed a second felony charge against Greitens, alleging that his campaign had taken donor and email lists from The Mission Continues, a veterans' charity that Greitens founded in 2007, and used the information to raise funds for his 2016 campaign for governor.

Hawley announced an investigation based on the new felony charges. On April 30, he announced that his office had launched an investigation into possible violations of the state's Sunshine laws after allegations that a state employee had managed a social media account on Greitens's behalf. The same day, Greitens asked a judge to issue a restraining order blocking Hawley from investigating him.

On May 29, 2018, Greitens announced that he would resign effective June 1, 2018. Hawley issued a statement approving of the decision.

=== Affordable Care Act lawsuit ===
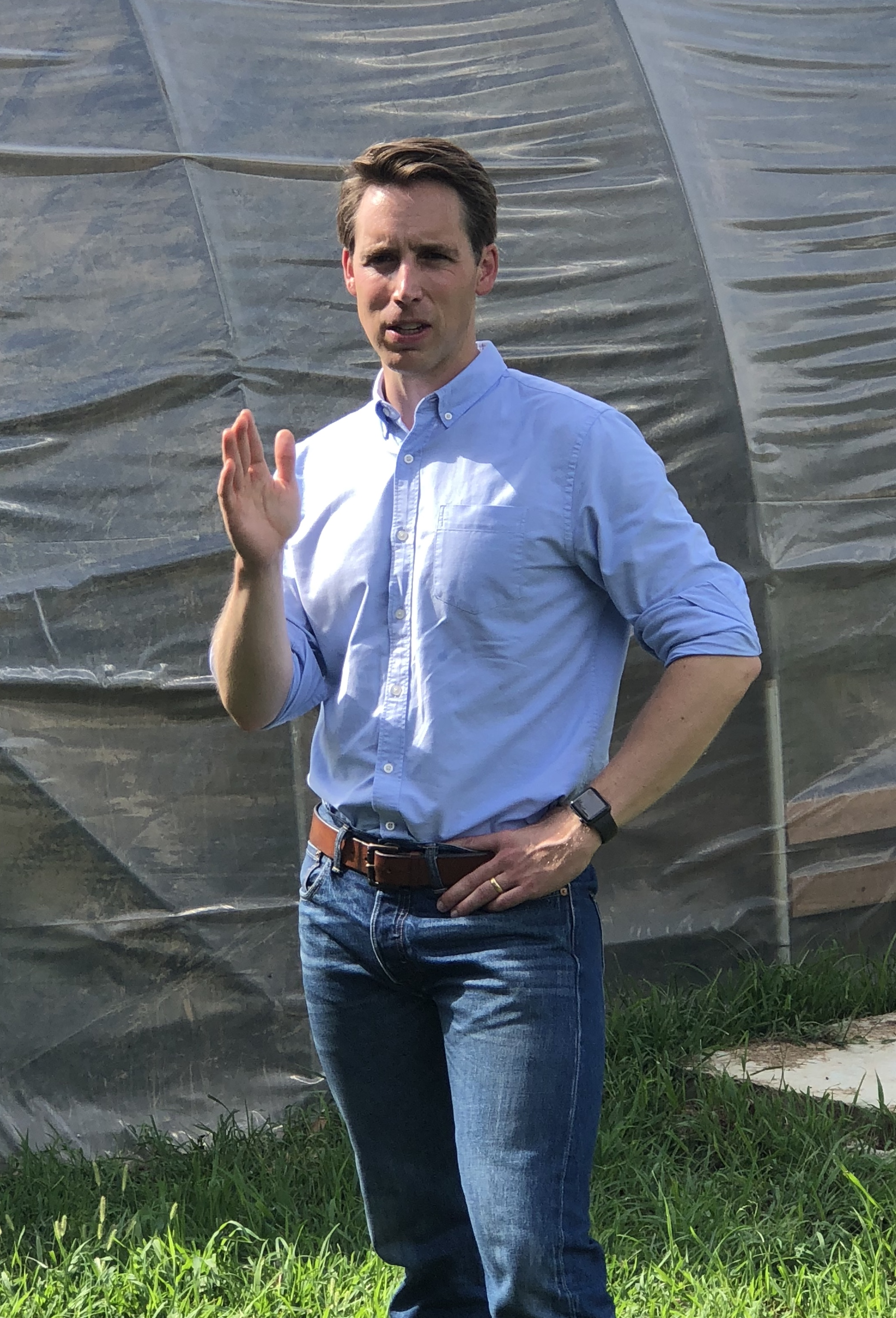
Hawley in Jackson in August 2018

In February 2018, Hawley joined 20 other Republican-led states in a lawsuit challenging the Affordable Care Act as unconstitutional. Though some argued the lawsuit would eliminate insurance protections for people with preexisting conditions, Hawley said he supported protections for preexisting conditions. In September 2018, amid criticism from Hawley's U.S. Senate opponent Claire McCaskill about the lawsuit's effect on coverage of preexisting conditions, Hawley's office said that he supported protections for individuals with preexisting conditions. Hawley later published an op-ed in the Springfield News-Leader, explaining that he supported protecting those with preexisting conditions by creating a taxpayer subsidy to reimburse insurance companies for covering these high-cost patients.

In December 2018, Judge Reed O'Connor ruled the entirety of the ACA unconstitutional. On appeal, the Fifth Circuit did not agree that the entire law should be voided.

=== Sentencing of Bobby Bostic ===
In March 2018, Hawley defended the 1995 sentencing of Bobby Bostic to 241 years in prison. Bostic had been 16 years old when he committed robbery and the other crimes for which he was later convicted and harshly sentenced. He and the American Civil Liberties Union (ACLU) had attempted to appeal his sentence to the U.S. Supreme Court, saying it violated the court's ruling in Graham v. Florida, which held that juveniles could not be sentenced to life imprisonment for charges lesser than homicide.

In a Supreme Court filing, Hawley argued that Bostic's sentencing did not violate the constitutional ban on cruel and unusual punishment, and that Graham v. Florida applied only to a sentence for one crime. The judge who had sentenced Bostic said she had come to believe the sentence was too harsh, and asked to join an amicus brief filed by 26 former judges, prosecutors, and law enforcement officials. On April 24, 2018, the Supreme Court rejected Bostic's appeal.

=== State staff used for campaign and Sunshine Law violations ===
On November 14, 2022, Cole County Circuit Court Judge Jon Beetem ruled that Hawley violated Missouri's open records law during his 2018 U.S. Senate campaign by withholding emails between his out-of-state political consultants and his taxpayer-funded staff. Beetem granted summary judgment, ruled Hawley's office had "knowingly and purposefully" violated Missouri's Sunshine Law, and fined the AG's office $12,000. When Hawley was AG, his staff used private email instead of government accounts to communicate with his political consultants. Those consultants illegally gave direct guidance and tasks to Hawley's staff and led meetings during office hours in the Missouri Supreme Court building. Beetem wrote, "There is no genuine dispute that the AGO knew the Sunshine Law required it to produce responsive documents in its possession when it received DSCC's two Sunshine Law requests, but made the conscious decision not to do so."

In 2023, the court demanded that the state pay more than $240,000 for the case's legal fees. An attorney on the case declared that Hawley should pay from the proceeds of his book Manhood: The Masculine Virtues America Needs rather than "sticking taxpayers".

=== Catholic clergy investigation ===
In August 2018, after a Pennsylvania grand jury released a report detailing over 1,000 cases of sexual abuse by Catholic clerics in that state, and protests in St. Louis by survivors of clergy sexual abuse in Missouri, Hawley announced that he would begin an investigation into potential cases of abuse in Missouri. Missouri was one of several states to launch such investigations in the wake of the Pennsylvania report; the attorneys general of Illinois, Nebraska, and New Mexico began similar inquiries. Hawley promised that he would investigate any crimes, publish a report for the public, and refer potential cases to local law enforcement officials. Archbishop of St. Louis Robert James Carlson pledged cooperation with the inquiry.

After the investigation, which was inherited by Hawley's successor, Eric Schmitt, the attorney general referred 12 former priests in September 2019 for prosecution based on charges of sexual abuse of minors.

== U.S. Senate (2019–present) ==
=== Elections ===
==== 2018 ====
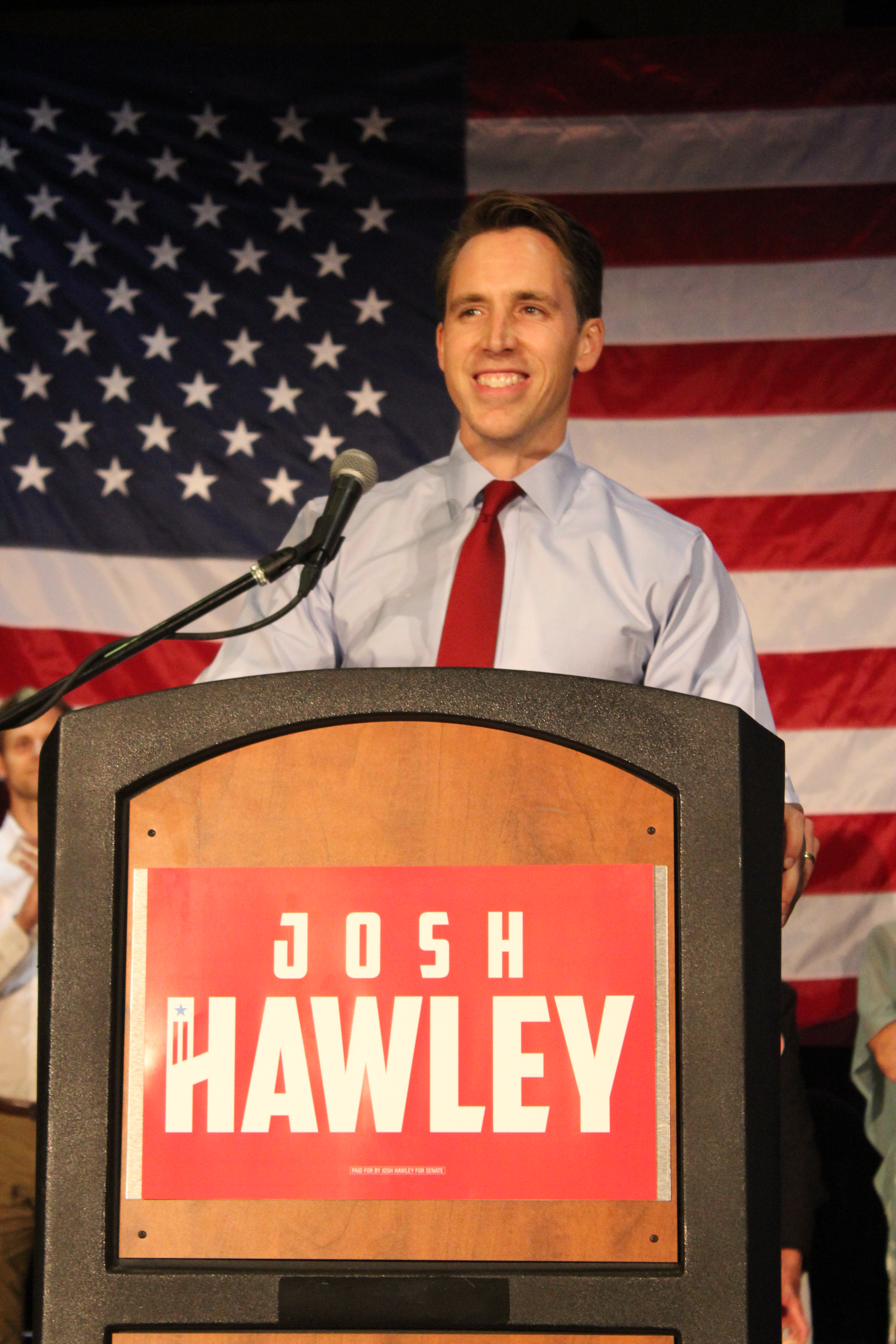
Hawley on election night after securing the Republican primary win

In August 2017, Hawley formed an exploratory campaign committee for the U.S. Senate. In October 2017, he declared his candidacy for the Republican nomination in Missouri's 2018 U.S. Senate election for the seat held by Democrat Claire McCaskill. Before the official announcement, four former Republican U.S. senators from Missouri (John Ashcroft, Kit Bond, John Danforth, and McCaskill's predecessor, Jim Talent) asked Hawley to run for the Senate seat.

The tightly contested Republican primary had 11 candidates hoping to unseat McCaskill. Hawley received substantial support from prominent Republicans, such as Senate Majority Leader Mitch McConnell, President Donald Trump, and the Senate Conservatives Fund. He won a large majority of the vote in the primary election.

Trump endorsed Hawley in November 2017. During the general election campaign, the Affordable Care Act became a central issue, with both candidates pledging to protect coverage for preexisting conditions. McCaskill criticized Hawley for his involvement in a lawsuit that sought to overturn the ACA, potentially eliminating protections for those with preexisting conditions. Hawley, meanwhile, highlighted McCaskill’s upcoming vote on the confirmation of CIA Director Mike Pompeo as Secretary of State, depicting her as obstructing Trump. His campaign spokesperson asked, "Will Senator McCaskill ignore her liberal donors and support Mike Pompeo for Secretary of State, or will she stick with Chuck Schumer and continue to obstruct the president?", adding, "It is deeply troubling how focused Senator McCaskill is on doing what's politically convenient instead of doing what's right."

Both Republicans and Democrats criticized Hawley for initiating his Senate campaign less than a year after being sworn in as attorney general, as during his attorney general campaign, he had put out advertisements criticizing "ladder-climbing politicians". Hawley dismissed this, saying that the Senate was not on his mind during the attorney general campaign.

During the campaign, Hawley released his and his wife's tax returns and called on McCaskill to release her and her husband's returns. McCaskill released her returns, which she files separately from her husband. When asked if he thought Trump should release his returns, Hawley did not say. Hawley criticized McCaskill's use of a private jet, calling her "Air Claire". He was, in turn, criticized for accepting a ride on a private jet owned by a Rex Sinquefield lobbyist.

In the November 2018 general election, Hawley defeated McCaskill, 51% to 46%.

On December 6, 2018, Missouri Secretary of State Jay Ashcroft launched an inquiry into whether Hawley misappropriated public funds for his Senate campaign. Hawley's office denied any wrongdoing. On February 28, 2019, Ashcroft closed the investigation because there was insufficient evidence that "an offense has been committed." A 2021 New York Post investigation of questionable campaign expenditures revealed that Hawley had apparently illegally spent such funds, for instance charging $80.04 at Jimmy Buffett's Margaritaville to "travel", on a lobbyist-funded junket to Universal Studios in Orlando, Florida. Almost a year later Hawley's office said he had reimbursed the campaign for the inappropriate expenditures.

==== 2024 ====
Hawley sought a second Senate term. He faced Democratic nominee Lucas Kunce, a U.S. Marine veteran. Hawley and Kunce had a heated debate about debates in front of press at the Governor's Ham Breakfast, in which both expressed their intentions to debate. Hawley pushed for a forum hosted by Missouri Farm Bureau; Kunce pressed for broadcast debates and suggested that the Missouri Farm Bureau's endorsement of Hawley presented legal complications.

Hawley's campaign received $5,000 from the Teamsters, but has been criticized by other Missouri union leaders.

At a campaign event at First Baptist Church in Ozark, Missouri, Hawley falsely claimed that the proposed Amendment 3, an abortion rights initiative, was related to transgender health care.

Hawley was criticized for his reliance on private jets in his campaign, spending $132,000 between mid-December 2023 and June 2024. He was reelected in November.

=== Tenure ===
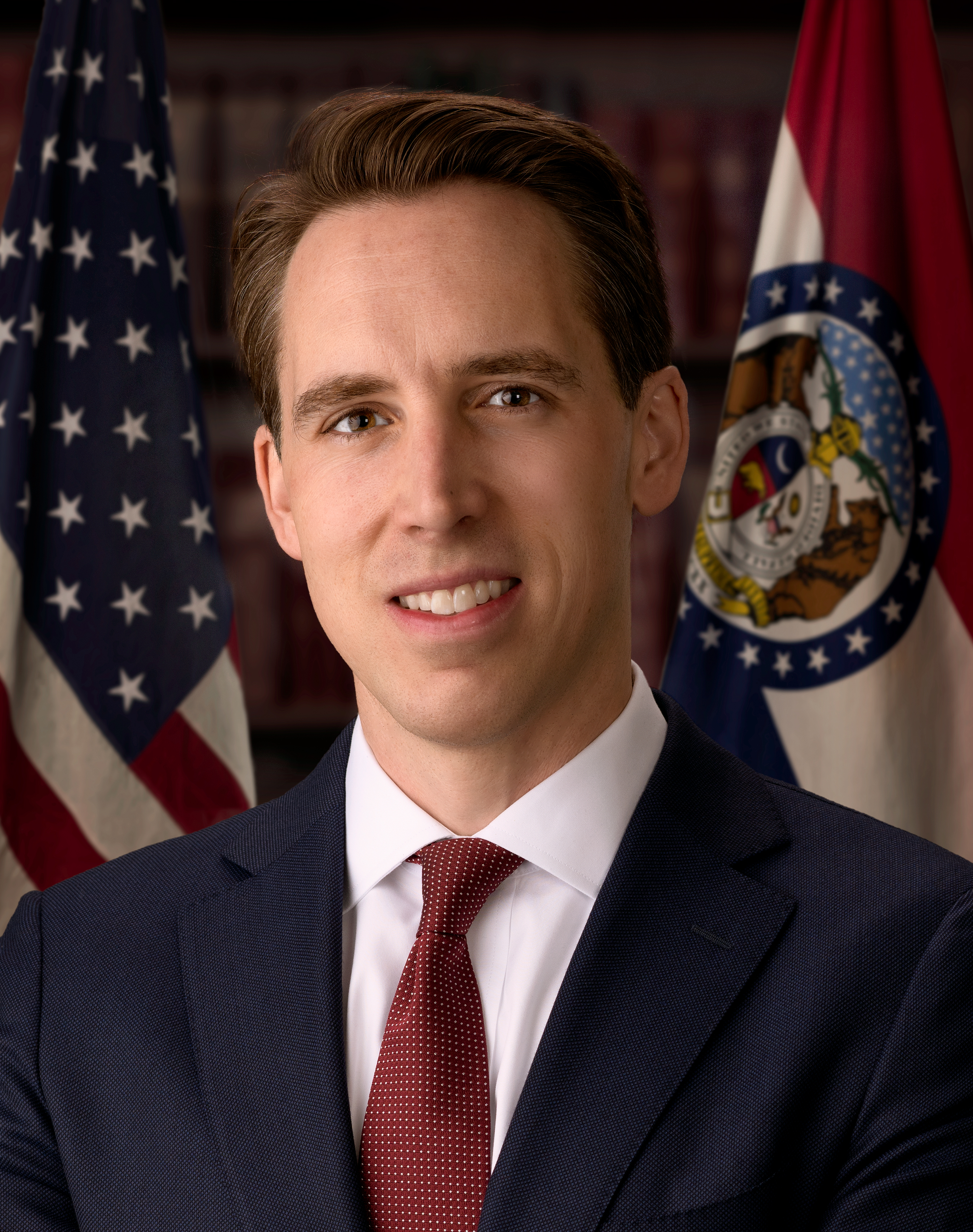
Hawley's alternative portrait during the 116th Congress

Hawley was sworn in as a U.S. senator on January 3, 2019.

In June 2019, Hawley played a major role in preventing Trump nominee Michael S. Bogren from being appointed as a district judge for the Western District of Michigan. Hawley accused Bogren of "anti-religious animus" in a case he took as a lawyer, in which Bogren compared Catholic views on homosexuality to the Ku Klux Klan's views on interracial marriage.

During the Hong Kong protests in October 2019, Hawley and Senator Ted Cruz visited Hong Kong and spoke in favor of the protests. Hawley called the city a "police state". Chief Executive of Hong Kong Carrie Lam called Hawley's assertion "irresponsible and unfounded".

On November 18, 2019, Hawley announced the National Security and Personal Data Protection Act, which would make it illegal for American companies to store user data or encryption keys in China. Engadget noted the bill might cause "serious problems" for companies that are legally obligated to store data in China, such as Apple and TikTok, and "might force them to leave China altogether". It was not Hawley's first technology-related bill; he had also introduced proposals to ban loot boxes in gaming and to restrict social network features "deemed addictive", among others. Hawley focused on TikTok, saying the bill would cover Russia as well as China, and "any other country the State Department deems a security risk". He said the bill was "targeted at social media platforms and data-intensive businesses", and "would block such mergers by default without pre-approval from the Committee on Foreign Investment in the United States". The bill also prevents the collection of "more user data than is necessary to conduct business".

Hawley joined President Donald Trump in his calls for an increase of the initial $600 coronavirus relief checks provided by the Consolidated Appropriations Act of 2021 to $2,000, which put him on the same side as "unlikely ally" Bernie Sanders. Alongside Sanders and Chuck Schumer, Hawley attempted to force a vote to increase the checks, but it was blocked by other Republican senators.

On February 8, 2021, after he voted against the nomination of Denis McDonough for Secretary of Veterans Affairs, Hawley became the only senator to vote against all of President Joe Biden's cabinet nominees except Cecilia Rouse, whom he voted to confirm as chair of the Council of Economic Advisers.

Ten months into Biden's term, Hawley had voted to approve only four of 118 executive appointments that received a Senate vote, and none in the preceding five months. This record made him a standout among senators. Political scientist Wendy Schiller compared Hawley to "senators who have basically made it their career to stop the Senate in its tracks." She noted that Hawley differed from his predecessors in that his obstruction had no clear policy goal, but was more about punishing the Biden administration.

On August 3, 2022, Hawley cast the sole vote against the Senate resolution agreeing to Sweden and Finland joining the NATO defense alliance; it passed, 95–1. Before and after the votes, Hawley said the resolutions were not in America's best interest, with China posing a greater threat than Russia. According to Politico:

Hawley has worked for months to distinguish himself from the Republican pack on national security, beginning with his blockade of Pentagon nominees in protest of the U.S. withdrawal from Afghanistan and his opposition to a $40 billion Ukraine aid package.

=== Attempts to overturn the 2020 presidential election results ===
After Joe Biden won the 2020 presidential election, Hawley announced his intention to object to the Senate's certification of the Electoral College vote count on January 6, 2021. He was the first senator to do so. Trump had refused to concede and made frequent baseless claims of fraud in the election. Hawley said that his attempt to reverse the election result was on behalf of those "concerned about election integrity." He made numerous statements suggesting that Trump could possibly remain in office. The New York Times wrote that Hawley was elevating false claims that President-elect Joe Biden stole the election. His maneuver prompted bipartisan condemnation of his action as undemocratic.

On December 30, 2020, Hawley said, "some states, particularly Pennsylvania, failed to follow their own state election laws". He repeated the assertion about Pennsylvania in a February 2021 fundraising email, which view was supported by a Pennsylvania appellate court in January 2022. (Note: On January 27, 2022, a Pennsylvania appellate court found Pennsylvania's mail-in voting law (Act 77) in violation of the state's constitution, but on August 2, 2022, a 5–2 decision of the Democratic-majority Pennsylvania Supreme Court overturned the lower appellate court's ruling.) But other courts had rejected such claims. Later in 2022, the Pennsylvania Supreme Court rejected the appellate court's argument, and the United States Supreme Court declined to consider an appeal to reverse the state's election results.

On December 30, 2020, after Hawley tweeted he would join the effort to object to Biden's victory, Walmart's official Twitter account responded, "Go ahead. Get your 2 hour debate. #soreloser." Hawley responded, accusing Walmart of using "slave labor" and "driv[ing] mom and pop stores out of business". Walmart deleted the tweet, apologizing to Hawley and saying it was "mistakenly posted by a member of our social media team." The event led the hashtag #BoycottWalmart to trend on Twitter.

On January 4, 2021, Hawley tweeted that his Washington, D.C. home had been vandalized and his family had been threatened by "Antifa scumbags" in an act of "leftwing violence" due to his claims of fraud. He said he was in Missouri at the time.

ShutdownDC, the group that staged the event, said it was a peaceful candlelight vigil and that they did not vandalize Hawley's house nor knock on the door. A video of the event shared by the group showed that some protesters wrote on the sidewalk in chalk, chanted through a megaphone, and left a copy of the U.S. Constitution at Hawley's door. Vienna, Virginia, police said the protesters were peaceful with "no issues, no arrests" necessary; police spokesman Juan Vazquez said the police "didn't think it was that big of a deal".

=== Activity around storming of the U.S. Capitol and public reaction ===
Hawley gives a raised fist salute to pro-Trump protesters outside of the U.S. Capitol on January 6, 2021. Some of these protesters stormed the Capitol building about an hour later.

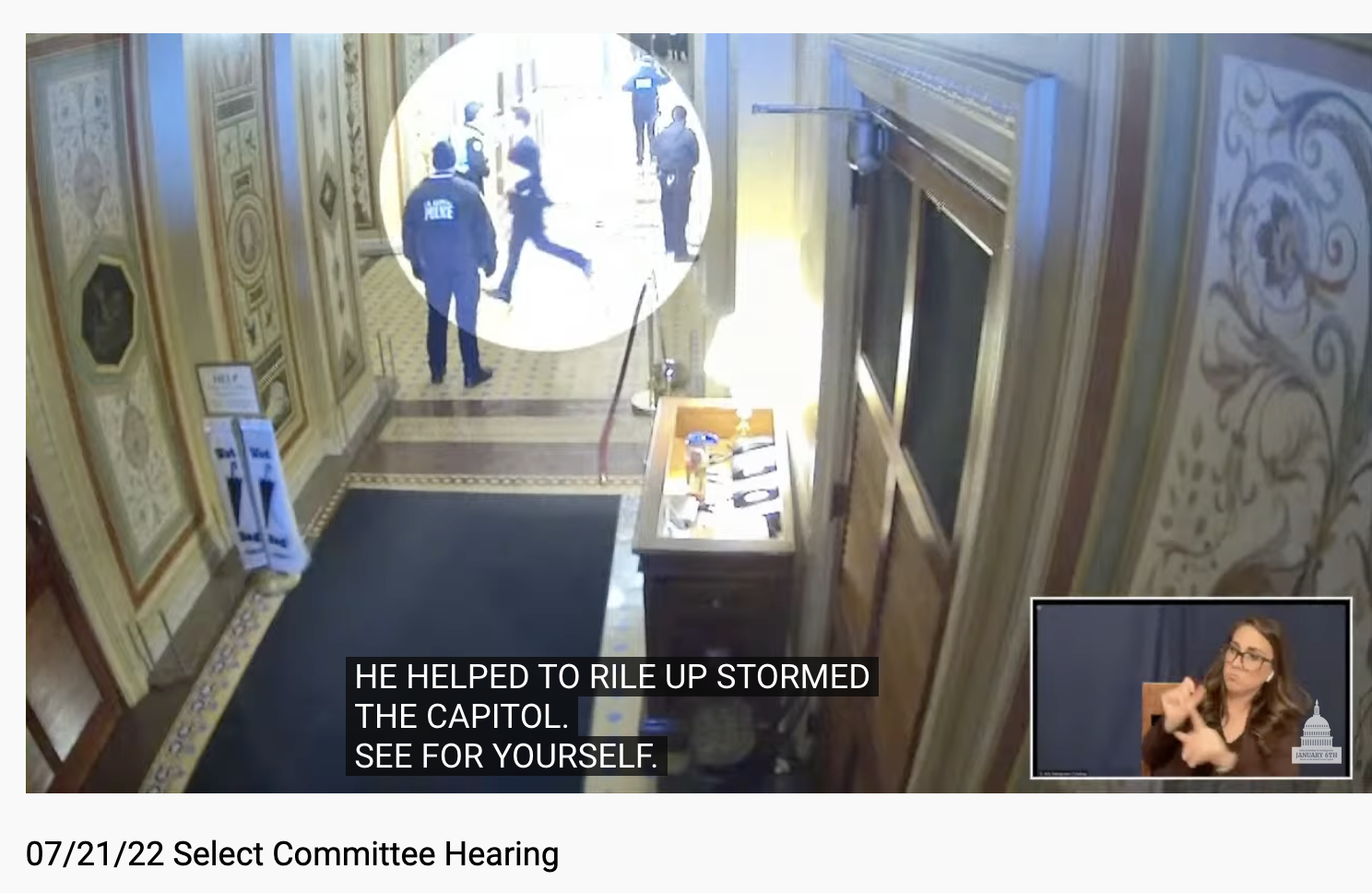
Captured still from a video of Hawley later running from a mob on January 6, shown during the Select Committee meeting of July 21, 2022, and within many Internet memes

On January 6, 2021, when Congress met to count the electoral votes for the 2020 presidential election, they were interrupted by pro-Trump rioters who stormed the U.S. Capitol building, forcing members of Congress to evacuate. Before the counting of the votes, to which Hawley had publicly announced he would object, he was photographed saluting the protestors with a raised fist outside the Capitol before the riot.

The photograph immediately became a subject of controversy; The Kansas City Star called it "the image that will haunt Josh Hawley" and "one of the iconic images to emerge from the day the Capitol was breached by rioters". and Pulitzer Prize-winning columnist Tony Messenger, of the St. Louis Post-Dispatch, said "the staging was perfect" and recommended the photograph be known as Hawley: The Face of Sedition. Tom Coleman, a former U.S. representative from Missouri and a fellow Republican, said Hawley's "clenched fist in front of the Capitol will seal his fate". The photographer, Francis Chung, declined to weigh in on the photograph's political impact, saying it "is what it is" and "kind of speaks for itself". Later that day, video showed Hawley running through the Capitol, fleeing the rioters who had invaded the building.

That same day, The Kansas City Star's editorial board published an editorial arguing that Hawley "has blood on his hands" due to the event, which they called a "coup attempt". They said that "no one other than President Donald Trump himself is more responsible" than Hawley, "who put out a fundraising appeal while the siege was underway". The next day, it published an editorial calling for Hawley to resign or be removed from office. Similarly, The St. Louis Post-Dispatch, Missouri's other major newspaper, published an editorial on January 7 calling for Hawley to resign and Republican "silent enablers" to denounce Trumpism, writing, "Hawley's tardy, cover-his-ass condemnation of the violence ranks at the top of his substantial list of phony, smarmy and politically expedient declarations" and "Trumpism must die before it morphs into Hitlerism. Defenders like Hawley deserve to be cast into political purgatory for having promoted it".

Political scientists Henry Farrell and Elizabeth N. Saunders called Hawley's ploy a "cynical theatrical gesture" with Hawley "pursuing short-term political gain at the risk of long-term chaos". John Danforth, a former Republican senator from Missouri and Hawley's political mentor, said that supporting Hawley was the "worst mistake I ever made in my life". Danforth said Hawley was directly responsible for the riot. David M. Kennedy, who served as Hawley's academic adviser at Stanford, said he "absolutely could not have predicted that the bright, idealistic, clear-thinking young student that I knew would follow this path" and was "more than a little bamboozled by it, certainly distressed by it", though he said he did not believe Hawley directly incited the mob.

Prominent conservative columnist George Will wrote on January 6 that Hawley, Trump, and Senator Ted Cruz "will each wear the scarlet S of a seditionist". On January 9, NBC News reported that several Republican Party insiders anonymously condemned Hawley's actions, with one strategist saying of the fist salute that Hawley "looked phony and out of place and like a doofus", in a manner reminiscent of Michael Dukakis's tank photograph during the 1988 presidential campaign. After the riot, Hawley's approval rating dropped by six percentage points among Missouri voters, and nine among Missouri Republicans.

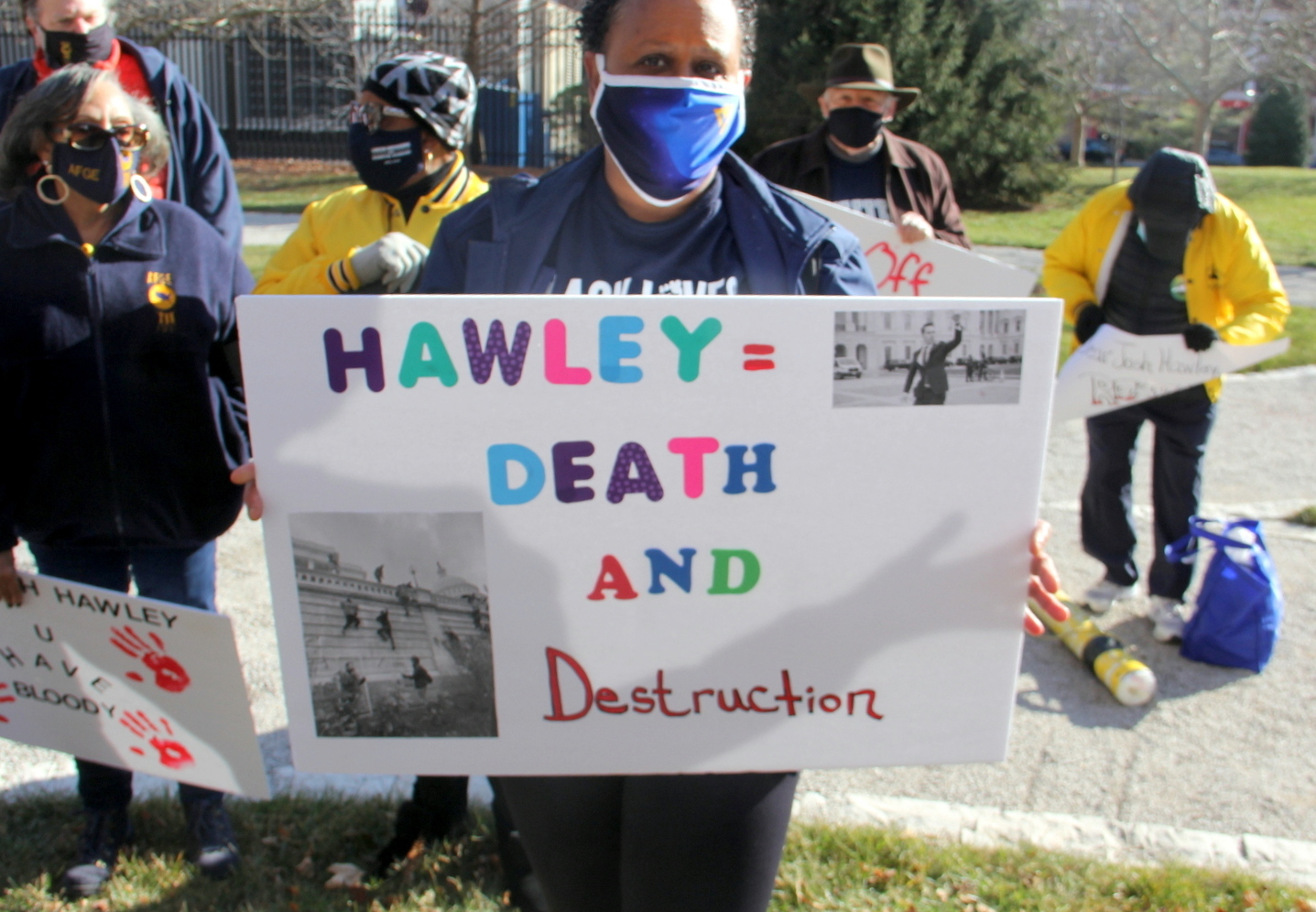
AFGE members protested against Hawley on January 12.

In the wake of the riot, other Republican lawmakers tried to persuade Hawley to abandon his objections to Biden's win, but he voted in support of the objections to certifying Arizona's and Pennsylvania's electoral votes, claiming that Pennsylvania election officials had violated the state's constitution. This claim was supported in a ruling by a Pennsylvania appellate court on January 27, 2022, but overturned by the State Supreme Court, and the U.S. Supreme Court refused to hear the case. Both senators from Pennsylvania rejected his objections, and the Senate rejected his objections by votes of 6–93 and 7–92, respectively.

Some political commentators and Democratic lawmakers dubbed Hawley and other senators who sought to overturn the election the Sedition Caucus. Hawley has since faced bipartisan calls for his resignation, to which he has responded that he "will never apologize for giving voice to the millions of Missourians and Americans who have concerns about the integrity of our elections". Thousands of law school students and alumni, including at Hawley's alma mater Yale Law School, also called for Hawley and Cruz to be disbarred. On January 9, hundreds of protesters assembled in Downtown St. Louis in front of the Old Courthouse to demand Hawley's resignation.

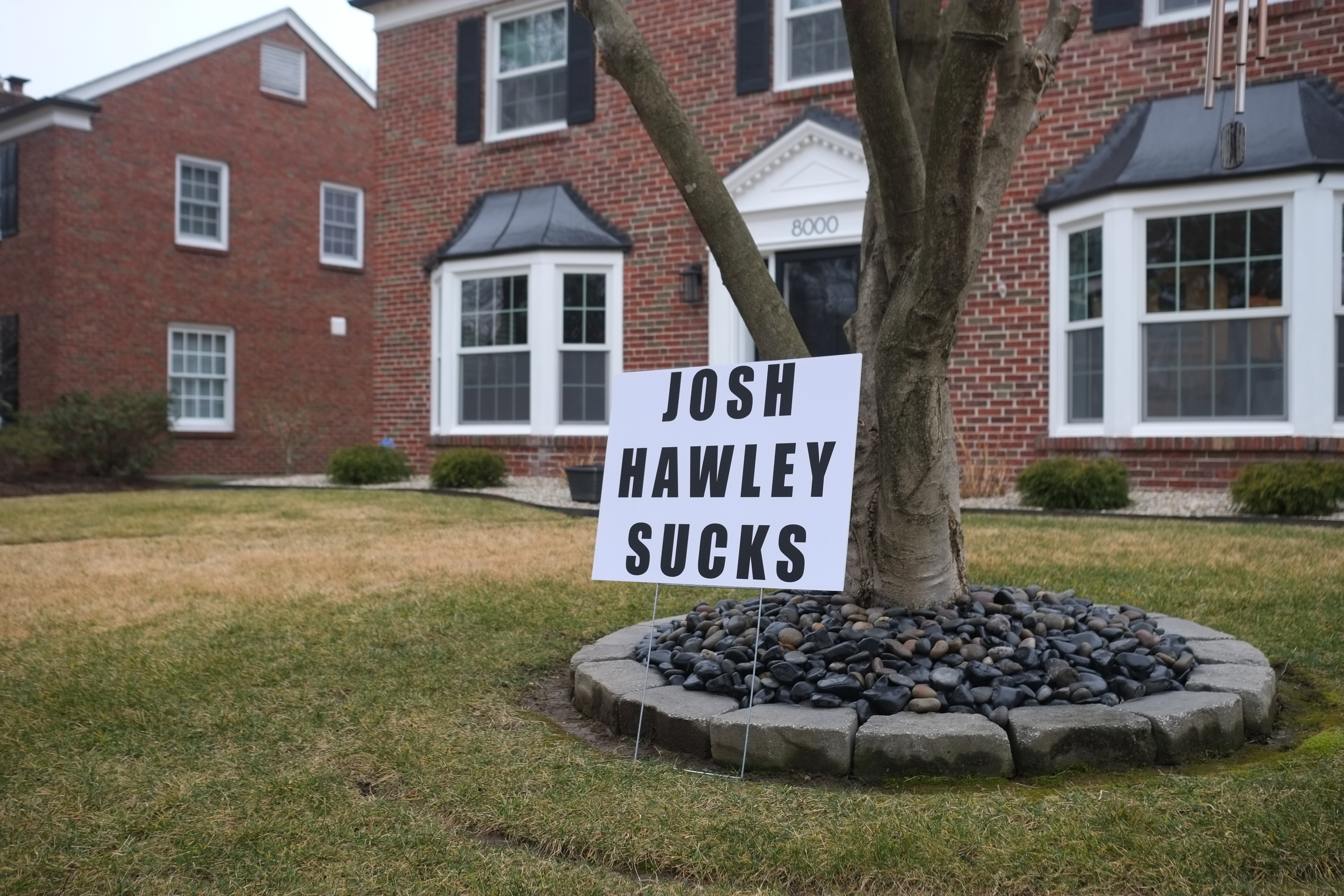
A lawn sign put up in Clayton in protest of Hawley on January 16

Several political donors and companies associated with Hawley have cut off financial ties. David Humphreys, who with his mother and sister donated more than $6 million to Hawley's campaigns, called for him to be censured, having "revealed himself as a political opportunist willing to subvert the Constitution and the ideals of the nation he swore to uphold".

On January 7, Simon & Schuster canceled its planned publication of Hawley's book The Tyranny of Big Tech, saying it "cannot support Senator Hawley after his role in what became a dangerous threat". The book was later picked up by Regnery Publishing, which frequently publishes books by conservative authors. On January 11, several companies, including Airbnb, American Express, AT&T, Best Buy, Dow Inc., and Mastercard, announced they would end fundraising for all Republicans who objected to Biden's victory, including Hawley; Hallmark Cards, based in Kansas City, said it had asked Hawley and Senator Roger Marshall of Kansas to return all contributions. Conversely, the Senate Conservatives Fund, a conservative political action committee, began raising money for Hawley and aggressively supporting him after the riot, raising $700,000 and spending nearly $400,000 to send texts and emails in support of him. A group of former McCaskill staffers created a political action committee aimed at unseating Hawley with the backronym JOSH PAC (Just Oust Seditious Hacks).

On January 21, seven Democratic senators filed a complaint against Hawley and Cruz to the Senate Ethics Committee, arguing that they "lent legitimacy to the mob's cause and made future violence more likely." Hawley called the complaint "a flagrant abuse of the Senate ethics process and a flagrant attempt to exact partisan revenge". He filed an ethics complaint of his own against the seven senators, alleging their complaint was unethical due to potential coordination with Democratic Party leadership and claiming that he was a victim of cancel culture.

After the storming of the Capitol, several people sent disparaging messages intended for Hawley to Representative Josh Harder, a California Democrat, as they had confused the two due to their names' similarity.

On May 28, 2021, Hawley voted against creating an independent commission to investigate the riot.

On July 21, 2022, the House Select Committee broadcast video footage of Hawley running through the halls of Congress to escape the mob on January 6, contrasting it with his earlier fist-raised encouragement of the crowd. The video provoked laughter in the chamber and commentary on social media that included "Run Josh Run" (Dan Rather) and "Josh Hawley running away to a variety of soundtracks."

In March 2023, Tucker Carlson criticized footage of Hawley running as "deceptively edited", saying the committee did not show other senators fleeing. FactCheck.org concluded that Carlson's statement was misleading.

In McCay Coppins's 2023 biography of Mitt Romney, Romney: A Reckoning, Romney called Hawley "the smartest person in the room", but said he "doesn't see a future of working with him on anything" due to Hawley's obstructions to certifying electoral votes in the 2020 presidential election.

=== Committee assignments ===
For the 117th United States Congress, Hawley was named to four Senate committees. They are:

- Committee on Armed Services
  - Subcommittee on Airland
  - Subcommittee on Personnel
  - Subcommittee on Seapower
- Committee on Homeland Security and Governmental Affairs
  - Emerging Threats and Spending Oversight
  - Governmental Operations and Border Management
- Committee on Small Business and Entrepreneurship
- Committee on the Judiciary
  - Subcommittee on Competition Policy, Antitrust, and Consumer Rights
  - Subcommittee on Criminal Justice and Counterterrorism
  - Subcommittee on Human Rights and the Law (Ranking)
  - Subcommittee on Privacy, Technology, and the Law

For the 116th United States Congress, Hawley was named to five Senate committees. They are:

- Committee on Armed Services
  - Subcommittee on Emerging Threats and Capabilities
  - Subcommittee on Seapower
  - Subcommittee on Strategic Forces
- Committee on Homeland Security and Governmental Affairs
  - Subcommittee on Federal Spending Oversight and Emergency Management
  - Subcommittee on Investigations (Permanent)
- Committee on the Judiciary
  - Subcommittee on Antitrust, Competition Policy and Consumer Rights
  - Subcommittee on Border Security and Immigration
  - Subcommittee on Crime and Terrorism (chair)
- Committee on Small Business and Entrepreneurship
- Special Committee on Aging

== Political positions ==
Hawley's political views have been described as nationalist and populist. He has been called a Trump loyalist.

=== Abortion ===
Hawley opposes abortion and has called for the appointment of "constitutionalist, pro-life judges" to the U.S. Supreme Court and other federal courts. He has called Roe v. Wade "one of the most unjust decisions" in American judicial history. Missouri's Right to Life PAC endorsed Hawley for Senate. In July 2020, Hawley wrote that to earn his support, a Supreme Court nominee must have publicly, on the record, before nomination, asserted that Roe v. Wade was incorrectly decided. Later that year he voted to confirm Amy Coney Barrett, who had strongly criticized Roe v. Wade without explicitly saying it was wrongly decided and declined to do so during hearings. Hawley said the nominee was "the most openly pro-life judicial nominee to the Supreme Court in my lifetime."

=== Christian nationalism ===
Hawley has advocated Christian nationalism, writing: "Some will say now that I am calling America a Christian nation. So I am [...] And some will say that I am advocating Christian nationalism. And so I do." He asserts that the United States was "founded by Christian believers and that our fundamental ideals, including those in the Constitution, Declaration of Independence, and Bill of Rights all come to us from a Christian tradition." Political scientist Tim Lewis says this is inaccurate, citing secular philosophers Hobbes, Locke, and Rousseau as providing the tenets for the founding of the country.

In October 2024, Hawley was a featured speaker at Sean Feucht's rally on the National Mall, calling for a revival to rebuild the country on "the truth of Jesus Christ".

=== Corporate taxes ===
In October 2024, Hawley said that workers should not pay more taxes than corporations. He previously supported Trump's proposed corporate tax cuts and announced his reversal on the issue at a campaign event in Cottleville, Missouri.

In 2025, Hawley voted for the One Big Beautiful Bill Act.

=== COVID-19 pandemic ===
During early negotiations on COVID-19 relief spending, Senate Majority Leader Mitch McConnell proposed a partial rebate for around 70 million households with net incomes below about $50,000. His proposal faced "swift bipartisan opposition", including from Hawley, leading the restrictions to be dropped.

In April 2020, Hawley proposed that the U.S. government pay businesses to keep their workers on payroll for the duration of the COVID-19 pandemic and rehire any workers who had already been laid off. His proposal was similar to programs that various European countries, including Denmark, the Netherlands, and the UK, had implemented.

In December 2020, Hawley teamed up with Senator Bernie Sanders, an independent from Vermont who caucuses with the Democrats, to demand that any new stimulus deal include direct payments of at least $1,200 to American workers. As leverage, Hawley and Sanders used the upcoming Christmas recess and the deadline to pass a new continuing resolution to avert a government shutdown.

In June 2021, Hawley called for Anthony Fauci to resign from his role as Director of the National Institute of Allergy and Infectious Diseases.

=== Elections ===
In 2023, Hawley introduced the Ending Corporate Influence on Elections Act, a bill that would reverse aspects of Citizens United v. FEC, specifically banning publicly traded companies from making independent expenditures, political advertisements for campaigns, and super PAC contributions. Mitch McConnell criticized the bill and warned other Republican senators against signing on, naming a list of senators, including Hawley, who benefited directly from the Senate Leadership Fund.

=== Environment ===
As Missouri attorney general, Hawley pushed for the deregulation of environmental protections put in place by President Barack Obama, and filed four lawsuits against the Trump administration in an attempt to expedite that process. He acknowledged the irony in his maneuver, saying "it turns out the best way to help President Trump pursue his agenda of rolling back federal overreach is to sue him."

In 2023, Hawley cosponsored an amendment to the National Defense Authorization Act that would reauthorize and expand Radiation Exposure Compensation Act. It was stripped from the final version despite wide support in the Senate. Hawley called it a betrayal and vowed to vote against a defense bill that does not include the amendment. Missouri communities near West Lake Landfill are among the groups impacted by radiation exposure seeking assistance.

=== Foreign policy ===
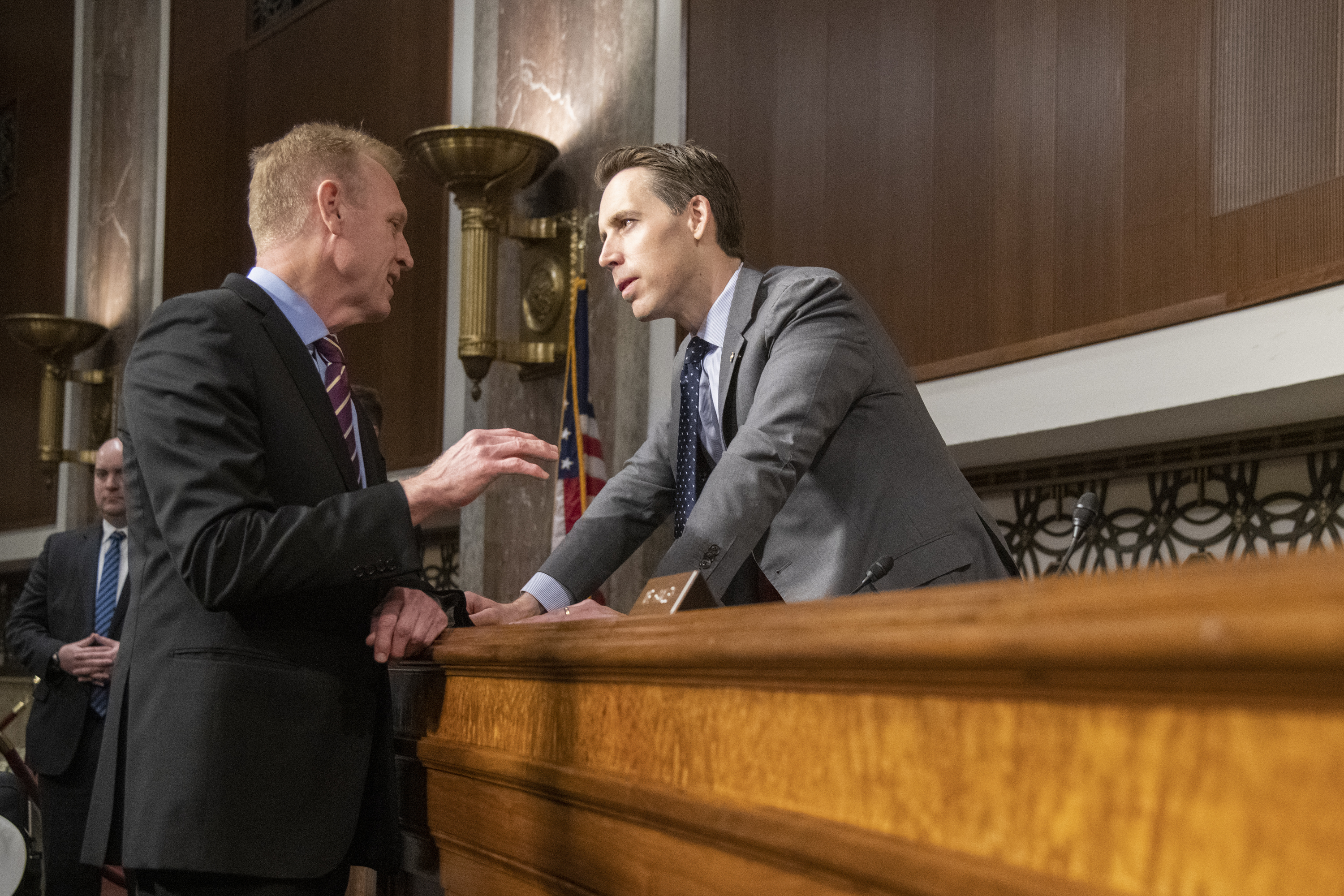
Hawley speaking with Acting Secretary of Defense Patrick M. Shanahan in 2019

Some of his former colleagues at St Paul's School claimed Hawley was "very hawkish" in his early 20s, supporting the Iraq War in its early stages and at one point making himself popcorn to eat while watching news coverage of the 2003 invasion. While a 25-year-old law student at Yale University, he wrote supportive blog posts of the war in 2005, as well as nation-building in Iraq. At the time, he supported a proactive democracy promotion foreign policy.

Since entering the U.S. Senate, Hawley reoriented himself as a staunch opponent of U.S. wars in the Middle East. He has advocated that the U.S. shift its focus away from the Middle East and toward China, which he sees as a grave threat to both democracy and national security. He has criticized the ideas of perpetual war and cosmopolitanism, for which he has blamed both the left and right wings, saying that "the quest to turn the world into a liberal order of democracies was always misguided," as it "depended on unsustainable American sacrifice and force of arms." And he has criticized the World Trade Organization, going so far as to call for it to be abolished, which he called "a start", and suggested that "along with it, the new model global economy" should be abolished too.

During the Biden administration, Hawley systematically blocked quick confirmation of Biden's nominees for foreign policy and intelligence posts, forcing the Senate to take extra steps to confirm nominees and delaying the filling of posts.

==== Afghanistan ====
After the 2021 fall of Kabul and the 2021 Kabul airport attack, Hawley was one in "a wave of other Republicans" who called on President Biden to resign.

==== China and Hong Kong ====
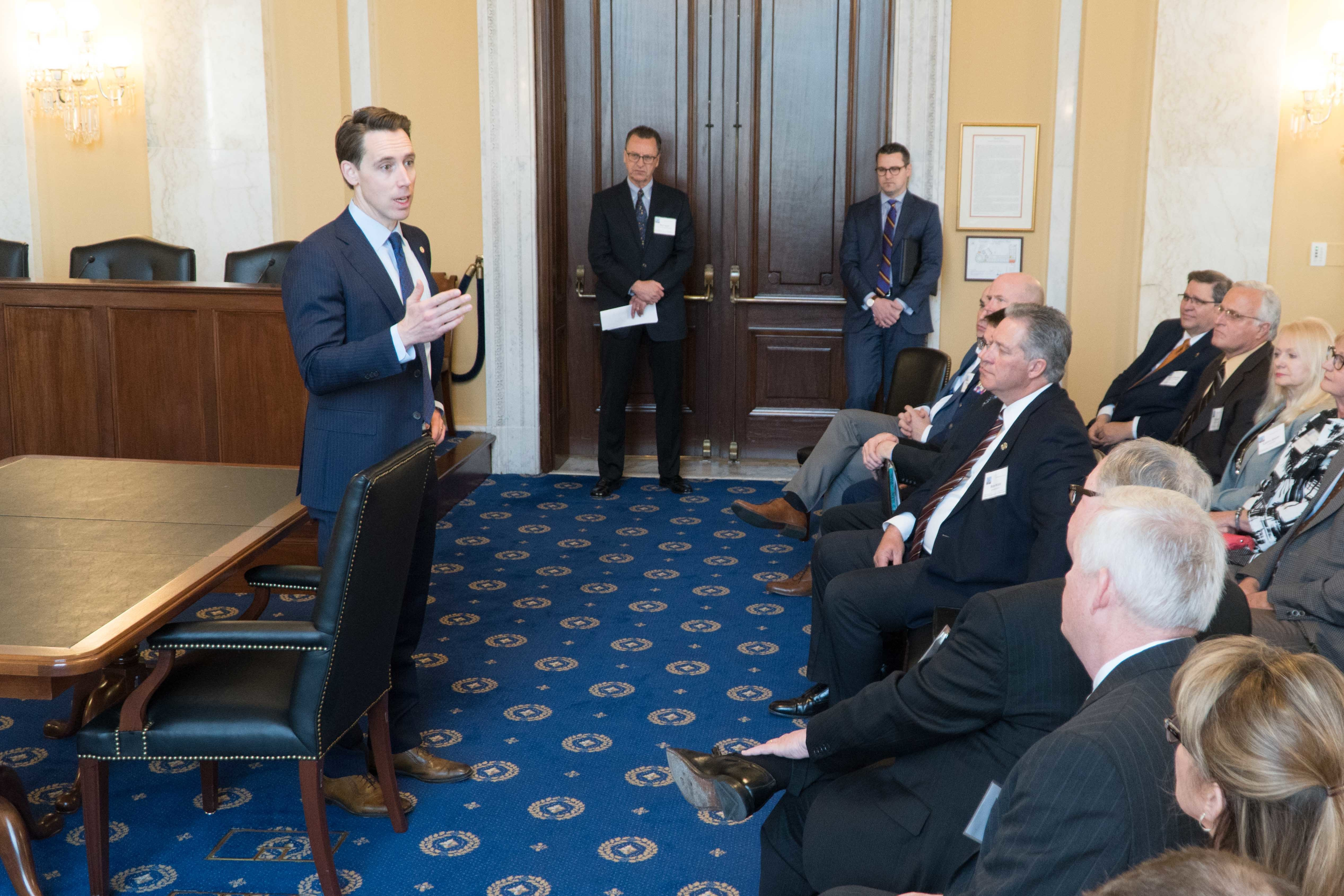
Hawley meets with members of the 139th Airlift Wing of the Missouri Air National Guard in April 2019.

Hawley is an outspoken critic of China, which he has called "the greatest security threat to this country in this century." He has said the U.S.'s goal should not be "to remake China from within" but rather "to deny Beijing's ability to impose its will without, whether it be upon Hong Kong, or Taiwan, or our allies and partners, or upon us."

In October 2019, Hawley co-sponsored the Hong Kong Human Rights and Democracy Act. Before the bill went to the House of Representatives, he visited Hong Kong to see the protests. He commented on Twitter that Beijing was trying to turn Hong Kong into a "police state". Chief Executive of Hong Kong Carrie Lam called the comment "irresponsible". On November 19, 2019, the U.S. Senate unanimously passed the act. On August 10, 2020, the Chinese government sanctioned Hawley and 10 other Americans for "behaving badly on Hong Kong-related issues".

Hawley has worked to create legislation that would prohibit data transmission to a set of blacklisted nations, including China.

On July 10, 2020, Hawley sent a letter to NBA commissioner Adam Silver criticizing the league for allowing players to put messages on their jerseys supporting the Black Lives Matter movement but not the 2019–20 Hong Kong protests or law enforcement officers. To promote the letter, Hawley's press office emailed it along with an announcement to several NBA reporters, including ESPN reporter Adrian Wojnarowski. Wojnarowski responded, "Fuck You." Hawley then tweeted a screenshot of Wojnarowski's response; Wojnarowski subsequently apologized to Hawley directly and posted an apology on Twitter. On July 12, ESPN temporarily suspended Wojnarowski over the incident. On September 23, 2020, Hawley once again criticized Silver for the NBA's business in China, tweeting, "Adam Silver just comes right out and says it: NBA's relationship with China involves 'trade offs' but overall is a 'net positive.' And by 'net positive,' he means billions of dollars for the NBA and by 'trade offs,' he means slave labor."

==== Israel ====
During his 2018 Senate campaign, Hawley's press office sent out an email criticizing Claire McCaskill for supporting the Joint Comprehensive Plan of Action, writing, "We should be standing with President Trump and Israel today. If you aren't, you are standing with the mullahs and John Kerry. Sen. McCaskill needs to make it clear that she stands with President Trump and Israel, and not the mullahs."

Hawley opposes the Boycott, Divestment and Sanctions movement.

During the Gaza war, Hawley expressed support for Israel and defended its attack on Gaza as self-defense. With regard to the pro-Palestinian protests on American campuses, he condemned what he called "the hateful, antisemitic rhetoric".

==== Iran ====
In 2026, Hawley said he opposed a War Powers Resolution on the 2026 Iran war.

==== Against "cosmopolitan priorities" ====
On July 16, 2019, at the National Conservatism Conference, organized by Israeli professor Yoram Hazony, Hawley said:

For years the politics of both Left and Right have been informed by a political consensus that reflects the interests not of the American middle, but of a powerful upper class and their cosmopolitan priorities. This class lives in the United States, but they identify as "citizens of the world". They run businesses or oversee universities here, but their primary loyalty is to the global community.

In his address, Hawley also denounced the "cosmopolitan agenda", the "cosmopolitan class", the "cosmopolitan consensus", the "cosmopolitan economy", and the "cosmopolitan elite". His statement was called antisemitic by several political commentators and Jewish leaders, as well as by the Anti-Defamation League, which called for Hawley to apologize. The Jewish Telegraphic Agency specifically compared his reference to "cosmopolitan elites" to the term "rootless cosmopolitan", an antisemitic smear popularized by Joseph Stalin and also used by Nazis. Andrew Silow-Carroll wrote for J. The Jewish News of Northern California that Hawley was using his connections with Jewish people as a way to dodge allegations of antisemitism. In response to the allegations, Hawley tweeted, "The liberal language police have lost their minds." Hazony and the Republican Jewish Coalition defended Hawley's remarks.

On October 21, 2019, Hawley attacked Jewish Washington Post reporter Greg Sargent as a "smug, rich liberal elitist"; Sargent responded in a column that he was in fact raised in poverty. Mehdi Hasan argued Hawley's attack was antisemitic, though Sargent did not make that claim.

==== Mexico ====
In July 2019, Hawley traveled to McAllen, Texas, along the Mexico–United States border, saying, "the nonstop flow of drugs and human trafficking coming into this country is a crisis, plain and simple. I want to learn more about the challenges our agents face, the problems these local communities are dealing with, and how we can figure out a path forward. We are facing a surge at the southern border like we have never seen before, and Congress needs to get off its backside and act."

On November 6, 2019, Hawley recommended that the U.S. impose sanctions and freeze assets of Mexican officials he did not feel were doing enough to address Mexican drug cartels.

On January 19, 2021, Hawley blocked the quick confirmation of Department of Homeland Security secretary nominee Alejandro Mayorkas after Mayorkas would not commit to spending $1.4 billion the U.S. government had appropriated for a border wall expansion.

==== Russia ====
Hawley has called the Mueller report a "hoax" and the Steele dossier "lies from a Russian spy".

In January 2019, Hawley was one of 11 Republican senators to vote for legislation aimed at blocking Trump's intended lifting of sanctions on three Russian companies.

In July 2020, Hawley said he did not believe news reports about a Russian bounty program funding the Taliban, but still said, "if they so much as think about putting bounties on the heads of American soldiers, there will be punishment."

==== NATO expansion ====
In January 2022, Hawley called on Biden to drop support of plans for Ukraine to eventually join NATO, on the basis that committing troops to defend Ukraine would undermine the United States' ability to prevent Chinese hegemony in the Indo-Pacific.

On August 3, 2022, Hawley cast the sole vote against the Senate resolution agreeing to Sweden and Finland joining the NATO defense alliance; it passed, 95–1. Before and after the votes, Hawley said the resolutions were not in the United States' best interest, with China posing a greater threat than Russia.

==== Saudi Arabia ====
During a debate in the 2018 Senate campaign, Hawley and McCaskill agreed that if it was confirmed that the Saudi government was behind the assassination of Jamal Khashoggi, the U.S. should respond severely.

After the 2019 Abqaiq–Khurais attack, Hawley said, "we shouldn't attack anybody on behalf of Saudi Arabia for Saudi Arabia's national interests" and instead should "preserve the security of the American people and the prosperity of our middle class."

==== Ukraine ====
In October 2019, Hawley called for an independent investigation into Joe Biden related to alleged dealings with Ukraine. He defended Donald Trump's phone call with Ukrainian president Volodymyr Zelensky and criticized Trump's first impeachment, saying Trump's words were "certainly not a crime". During the impeachment trial, Hawley said if additional witnesses were called and new documents considered, he would attempt to force votes on subpoenas for Michael Atkinson, Hunter Biden, Joe Biden, Adam Schiff, the anonymous whistleblower and a reported acquaintance of the whistleblower.

During the 2022 Russian invasion of Ukraine, Hawley was one of 11 Republican senators to vote against a $40 billion emergency military and humanitarian aid package for Ukraine that the U.S. Senate passed on May 19, 2022. The measure had overwhelming bipartisan approval. Hawley wrote that the bill "is not in America's interests", adding, "It neglects priorities at home (the border), allows Europe to freeload, short changes critical interests abroad and comes [with] no meaningful oversight."

==== Venezuela ====
On April 3, 2019, Hawley was part of a group of eight Republicans and seven Democrats to sponsor the Venezuelan Emergency Relief, Democracy Assistance and Development (VERDAD) Act, which was aimed at recognizing Juan Guaidó as the president of Venezuela rather than Nicolás Maduro. The bill would provide $200 million in aid for Venezuela, $200 million in aid for neighboring countries accepting Venezuelan refugees, revoke U.S. visas from sanctioned Venezuelan officials, and remove sanctions on officials not accused of human rights abuses who recognized Guaidó.

In 2026, Hawley voted against a War Powers Resolution on the 2026 United States strikes in Venezuela.

=== Gasoline taxes ===
In May 2026, Hawley introduced a bill to suspend federal gasoline taxes.

=== Gun policy ===
Hawley received a 93% rating from the National Rifle Association (NRA) for 2018 and an 86% rating for 2016. He does not support an assault weapons ban, but does support some gun-control measures, including strengthening the National Instant Criminal Background Check System, banning bump stocks, and banning mentally ill people from having guns. During his Senate campaign, Hawley used National Media as a media consultant, the same firm the NRA employs.

=== Hate crimes ===
Hawley was one of six Republican senators to vote against advancing the COVID-19 Hate Crimes Act, which would allow the U.S. Justice Department to review hate crimes related to COVID-19 and establish an online database. He was the sole senator to vote against the passage of an amended version of the act that would help investigate anti-Asian hate crimes, saying, "It's too broad. As a former prosecutor, my view is it's dangerous to simply give the federal government open-ended authority to define a whole new class of federal hate crime incidents."

=== Health care ===
Hawley has criticized the Affordable Care Act (Obamacare). As attorney general of Missouri, he joined a lawsuit with 20 other states seeking to have it declared unconstitutional. Hawley said the act "was never constitutional" and spoke proudly of his involvement in the lawsuit. His 2018 Senate campaign said that he supported protections for individuals with preexisting conditions. He later published an op-ed in the Springfield News-Leader saying that he supports protecting those with preexisting conditions by creating a taxpayer subsidy to reimburse insurance companies for covering these high cost patients. In 2025, Hawley voted for the One Big Beautiful Bill Act, despite calling its provisions on Medicaid "both morally wrong and politically suicidal". He said, "If Congress cuts funding for Medicaid benefits, Missouri workers and their children will lose their health care. And hospitals will close. It’s that simple".

=== Human trafficking ===
Hawley has said that human trafficking is the result of the American sexual revolution in the 1960s due to the social encouragement of premarital sex and the use of contraception. After being criticized for these statements, he said that Hollywood culture was a major cause of human trafficking. Hawley has said that the appropriate place for sex is "within marriage".

=== Immigration ===
Hawley supports funding the construction of a wall along the southern border to stop illegal immigration.

Hawley supported the Trump administration's family separation policy, saying "It is an entirely preventable tragedy. Don't cross the border illegally and this won't happen."

Of judicial proceedings for a green card-holding Missouri resident in ICE detention and threatened with deportation over a bounced check, Hawley said "this is working the right way" and it will "be up to a judge to decide".

=== In-vitro fertilization and embryonic stem-cell research ===
Hawley co-sponsored federal legislation that would have defined human life and personhood as beginning at the moment of fertilization, without exceptions for in-vitro fertilization (IVF) or embryonic stem-cell research. In 2013, he said he believed that human life and personhood begin at fertilization, before conception, and that he opposed forms of birth control that prevent conception "by preventing implantation of a fertilized egg". After public backlash to the Alabama Supreme Court's ruling that embryos are human persons under state law and that IVF clinics are therefore liable for the loss of embryos as if the embryos were human infants, Hawley announced that he supports legal access to IVF. He defended Missouri's state laws, which allow IVF, but which also define an "embryo" as an "unborn child".

In June 2024, Hawley voted against a measure that included a mandate for insurance to cover IVF treatment.

=== Insider trading ===
Hawley supports banning members of Congress from stock trading. In July 2025, he was the only Republican to vote in favor of a bill to prevent insider trading.

=== Labor ===
In his 2018 Senate campaign, Hawley did not take a firm position on right-to-work legislation that was subject to a referendum by Missouri voters at the time. His spokesperson said of right-to-work, which would hamper labor unionizing, that "nobody should be forced to pay union dues." In 2023 and 2024, Hawley pivoted on union issues and joined United Auto Workers at a picket line, saying, "These guys deserve a raise. They've worked hard. They all just deserve better, and the company can absolutely afford to pay it." Hawley said he does not support workers in public-sector trade unions, saying they have "held government hostage".

Also in 2018, Hawley expressed opposition to a raise in the Missouri minimum wage from $7.85/hour to $8.60 in 2019 and $12 by 2023. In 2021, Hawley expressed support for a $15 minimum wage for businesses with at least $1 billion in annual revenue. In 2025, he co-sponsored a bill with Senator Peter Welch to set the federal minimum wage at $15 an hour and to index it to inflation. He also supported a tax credit for workers making less than $16.50 an hour.

=== LGBT rights ===
In December 2015, Hawley supported exemptions for Missouri "businesses and religious groups from participating in same-sex ... marriage ceremonies".

In June 2020, the Supreme Court ruled in Bostock v. Clayton County that federal law prohibits workplace discrimination on the basis of sexual orientation or gender identity, Hawley criticized the decision, saying it "represents the end of the conservative legal movement".

In May 2022 Hawley said he would be "shocked" if Obergefell v. Hodges, the Supreme Court decision ruling same-sex marriage bans unconstitutional, were overturned, calling it "settled law". Nevertheless, he stated his opposition to the decision.

Hawley opposed and voted against the 2022 Respect for Marriage Act, which requires states and the federal government to recognize the validity of same-sex and interracial marriages if they were legal in the jurisdiction where they were performed. The Respect for Marriage act ensures that valid marriages are recognized even if the Supreme Court decisions protecting them are overturned. At the same time, Hawley reiterated his position that "the issue of marriage" should be left to the states and "I don't think that the underlying Supreme Court decision was rightly decided". Missouri's constitution bars same-sex marriages.

After incidents such as his exchange with a law professor in a Senate hearing on Roe v. Wade, his negative comments about transgender people in reelection campaign fundraising emails, and a 2022 speech at the National Conservatism Conference, Hawley was accused of transphobia.

He co-sponsored a 2021 bill to restrict transgender women's participation in sports and signed a letter that objected to Title IX protection of transgender students.

=== Military housing ===
Hawley has voted against several bills, including National Defense Authorization Act for both 2023 and 2024, that included funding for military housing at Fort Leonard Wood. His office released correspondence with US Army secretary Christine Wormuth that shows he has advocated for funding, but subsequently voted against the associated measures. Hawley linked his vote against the 2024 NDAA to its lack of expanded compensation for victims of nuclear radiation exposure.

=== Social media and Big Tech ===
Hawley is known for his criticism of Big Tech and social media companies and has often broken with other Republicans in his support for regulation of Internet companies. He cosponsored Do Not Track legislation with Democrats Dianne Feinstein and Mark Warner. His book The Tyranny of Big Tech was published in May 2021. According to Gilad Edelman of Wired, the book "raises valid concerns about the technology industry, and he proposes solutions worth taking seriously. But he embeds these ideas in a broader argument that is so wildly misleading as to call the entire project into question." Edelman writes that Hawley distorts the history of anti-trust in the United States, inaccurately portraying early-20th-century antitrust efforts and completely ignoring conservative opposition to antitrust enforcement since the 1970s.

In August 2019, Hawley introduced the Social Media Addiction Reduction Technology (SMART) Act, which would ban features, such as infinite scrolling and auto-play, that he says encourage internet addiction. Per the bill, users would be unable to use a platform for more than 30 minutes per day unless they manually change the settings once a month.

In March 2020, Hawley and several other senators proposed the "No TikTok on Government Devices Act", which would prevent federal employees from downloading the app. Previously, Hawley had called the app "a Chinese-owned social media platform so popular among teens that Mark Zuckerberg is reportedly spooked".

Hawley has criticized Section 230, and has proposed legislation that would regard Internet access as a privilege rather than a right. His proposal faced bipartisan criticism as "poorly drafted, imprecise, and fatally vague."

In January 2025, Hawley proposed legislation to criminalize use of Chinese-developed AI models like DeepSeek, with penalties of up to 20 years in prison and/or a $1 million fine. Language in the bill also prohibits academic collaborations with AI researchers in China, and obstructs transparency requirements as well as research developments outside proprietary Big Tech environments.

=== Social programs ===
In October 2025, Hawley called Supplemental Nutrition Assistance Program (SNAP) an "essential" "lifeline", "not an optional extra", and "one of our most vital forms of aid". He wrote, "nobody in America, this richest of nations, should go to bed hungry, and certainly no child". Previously, Hawley voted for the One Big Beautiful Bill Act, which included provisions restricting access to SNAP the Center on Budget and Policy Priorities called the largest cut to SNAP in history.

=== Trade and tariffs ===
Hawley supported Trump's imposition of trade tariffs, saying he hoped the tariffs would be temporary, eventually resulting in lower tariffs on U.S. agriculture than before the trade battles. In September 2018, he fully supported Trump's trade actions, saying, "It's a trade war that China started. If we're in a war, I want to be winning it."

On May 5, 2020, Hawley wrote an op-ed in The New York Times calling for the abolition of the World Trade Organization, arguing it did not serve American interests and "enabled the rise of China." Shortly afterward, he introduced a resolution to withdraw the U.S. from the WTO.

=== Donald Trump ===
Hawley has been characterized as a Trump loyalist. He voted to acquit Trump during his first Senate impeachment trial and accused Democrats of having abused the Constitution by starting the impeachment inquiry, declaring that it was "the first purely partisan impeachment in our history". The day after the Republican-held Senate acquitted Trump, Trump praised Hawley as having played a key role in his acquittal.

The St. Louis Post-Dispatch published an editorial blasting Hawley and Senator Roy Blunt for not distancing themselves from the January 6, 2021 storming of the United States Capitol and their continued support for Trump. Both senators voted to acquit in Trump's second impeachment trial. During Trump's second impeachment trial in the Senate, Hawley was in the Senate gallery rather than at his desk with the rest of the senators on the Senate floor. An NBC News reporter tweeted that Hawley could be seen "sitting up in the gallery with his feet up on the seat in front of him, reviewing paperwork". Later accused of ignoring the proceedings, Hawley called them "a total kangaroo trial".

=== Food benefits ===
On the 28th day of the 2025 federal government shutdown, Hawley wrote a New York Times op-ed titled "No American Should Go to Bed Hungry", in which he wrote "Saturday (Nov. 1) will be another grim milestone. That is the day about 42 million Americans will lose federal food assistance. Congress must not let that happen." He called for bipartisan cooperation to end the shutdown and/or to ensure food assistance would not go unfunded.

=== U.S. Supreme Court nominations ===
Alex Wagner asks Hawley about the Brett Kavanaugh Supreme Court nomination in a 2018 episode of The Circus (1 minute, 2 seconds).

Hawley's first commercial in the 2018 Senate campaign focused on Brett Kavanaugh's nomination to the U.S. Supreme Court, which he supported. After Kavanaugh was accused of sexual assault, Hawley staunchly defended him and said that Democrats had staged an "ambush".

On October 27, 2020, Hawley voted to confirm Amy Coney Barrett.

Hawley was sharply critical of Ketanji Brown Jackson's 2022 nomination to the Supreme Court, saying her tenure as a judge and member of the United States Sentencing Commission showed a "pattern of letting child porn offenders off the hook for their appalling crimes". Multiple news media fact-checks disagreed with Hawley's assertions. Conservative former prosecutor and commenter Andrew C. McCarthy wrote, "The allegation appears meritless to the point of demagoguery." Hawley and other Republican senators focused on the charges during Jackson's confirmation hearings, which fueled right-wing conspiracy and QAnon theories.

==== Supreme Court shortlist ====
On September 9, 2020, Trump announced that Hawley, Ted Cruz and Tom Cotton were on his shortlist for nominations to the Supreme Court should a vacancy occur. Hawley expressed his appreciation but declined the offer, saying, "Missourians elected me to fight for them in the Senate". After Ruth Bader Ginsburg died on September 18, Trump instead nominated Amy Coney Barrett on September 29.

=== Caucus memberships ===
- Senate Taiwan Caucus

== Personal life ==
In 2010, Hawley married Erin Morrow, a fellow Yale Law School graduate and an associate professor of law at the Regent University School of Law. They have three children. Following complaints that, after becoming attorney general, he was not abiding by a statutory requirement that the attorney general must reside within the city limits of the state capital (Jefferson City), Hawley began renting an apartment there, while his family continued to live in Columbia, Missouri. The Hawleys own a house in Vienna, Virginia, which they bought in 2019 after Hawley was elected to the U.S. Senate, after selling their Columbia home. Hawley's voter registration has his sister's address in Ozark, Missouri, so that he can be eligible to run again for Missouri's U.S. Senate seat.

Hawley was raised Methodist, but he and his family now attend an Evangelical Presbyterian Church.

== Electoral history ==
=== Missouri Attorney General ===
2016 Republican Missouri Attorney General primary
Party	Candidate	Votes	%
Republican	Josh Hawley	415,702	64.2
Republican	Kurt Schaefer	231,657	35.8
Total votes		647,359	100.0

2016 Missouri Attorney General election
Party	Candidate	Votes	%	±%
Republican	Josh Hawley	1,607,550	58.5	+17.71%
Democratic	Teresa Hensley	1,140,252	41.5	−14.31%
Total votes		2,747,802	100.0	N/A
Republican gain from Democratic				

=== U.S. Senator ===
2018 Republican U.S. Senate primary in Missouri
Party	Candidate	Votes	%
Republican	Josh Hawley	389,878	58.6
Republican	Tony Monetti	64,834	9.7
Republican	Austin Petersen	54,916	8.3
Republican	Kristi Nichols	49,640	7.5
Republican	Christina Smith	35,024	5.3
Republican	Ken Patterson	19,579	2.9
Republican	Peter Pfeifer	16,594	2.5
Republican	Courtland Sykes	13,870	2.1
Republican	Fred Ryman	8,781	1.3
Republican	Brian Hagg	6,871	1.0
Republican	Bradley Krembs	4,902	0.7
Total votes		664,889	100.0

2018 U.S. Senate election in Missouri
Party	Candidate	Votes	%	±%
Republican	Josh Hawley	1,254,927	51.4	+12.27%
Democratic	Claire McCaskill (incumbent)	1,112,935	45.6	−9.24%
Independent	Craig O'Dear	34,398	1.4	N/A
Libertarian	Japheth Campbell	27,316	1.1	−4.95%
Green	Jo Crain	12,706	0.5	N/A
Write-in		7	<0.01	N/A
Total votes		2,442,289	100.0	N/A
Republican gain from Democratic				

2024 United States Senate election in Missouri
Party	Candidate	Votes	%	±%
Republican	Josh Hawley (incumbent)	1,651,907	55.57%	▲4.19
Democratic	Lucas Kunce	1,243,728	41.84%	▼3.73
Libertarian	W.C. Young	35,671	1.20%	▲0.08
Better Party	Jared Young	21,111	0.71%	N/A
Green	Nathan Kline	20,123	0.68%	▲0.16
Write-in		19	0.00%	Steady
Total votes		2,972,559	100.00%	N/A
Republican hold				

== Publications ==
=== Articles ===
- Hawley, Joshua D. (2014). "The Transformative Twelfth Amendment". William & Mary Law Review. 55 (4): 1501–86.
- Hawley, Joshua D. (2014). "The Intellectual Origins of (Modern) Substantive Due Process". Texas Law Review. 93 (2): 275–350.
- Hawley, Joshua D. (2015). "Return to Political Theology". Notre Dame Law Review. 90 (4): 1631–62.
- Hawley, Joshua (June 4, 2019). "The Age of Pelagius". Christianity Today. ISSN 0009-5753.

=== Books ===
- Hawley, Joshua D. (2008). Theodore Roosevelt, Preacher of Righteousness. New Haven, CT: Yale University Press. ISBN 9780300120103.
- Hawley, Joshua D. (2021). The Tyranny of Big Tech. Washington, D.C.: Regnery Publishing. ISBN 9781684512393.
- Hawley, Josh (2023). Manhood: The Masculine Virtues America Needs. Regnery Publishing. ISBN 9781684513574.

== See also ==
- Donald Trump Supreme Court candidates
- List of attorneys general of Missouri
- List of law clerks for the chief justice of the United States
- List of United States senators from Missouri
- Neopatriarchy
- Sedition Caucus

== Notes ==
Party political offices
Preceded by Ed Martin	Republican nominee for Attorney General of Missouri; 2016	Succeeded by Eric Schmitt
Preceded by Todd Akin	Republican nominee for U.S. Senator from Missouri (Class 1); 2018, 2024	Most recent
Legal offices
Preceded by Chris Koster	Attorney General of Missouri; 2017–2019	Succeeded by Eric Schmitt
U.S. Senate
Preceded by Claire McCaskill	U.S. Senator (Class 1) from Missouri; 2019–present Served alongside: Roy Blunt, Eric Schmitt	Incumbent
Honorary titles
Preceded by Tom Cotton	Baby of the Senate; 2019–2021	Succeeded by Jon Ossoff
U.S. order of precedence (ceremonial)
Preceded by Mike Braun	Order of precedence of the United States as United States Senator	Succeeded by Rick Scott
Preceded by Jacky Rosen	United States senators by seniority 67th	Succeeded by Rick Scott
