= 2016 Missouri Attorney General election =

- November 8, 2016
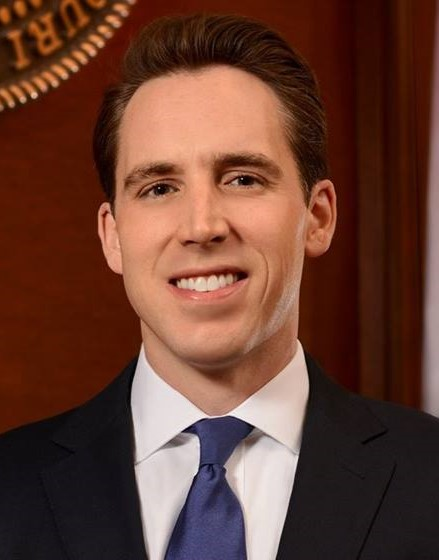

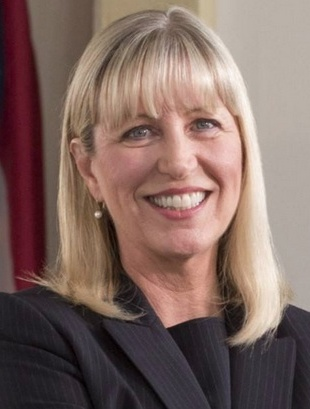
Nominee	Josh Hawley	Teresa Hensley
Party	Republican	Democratic
Popular vote	1,607,550	1,140,252
Percentage	58.50%	41.50%
- Hawley: 50–60% 60–70% 70–80% 80–90% >90% Hensley: 50–60% 60–70% 70–80% 80–90% >90% Tie: 50% No votes
Attorney General before election
Chris Koster
Democratic
Elected Attorney General
Josh Hawley
Republican

The 2016 Missouri Attorney General election was held on November 8, 2016, to elect the Attorney General of Missouri, concurrently with the 2016 U.S. presidential election, as well as elections to the United States Senate and elections to the United States House of Representatives and various state and local elections. Republican Josh Hawley defeated the Democratic nominee Teresa Hensley.

Incumbent Democratic Attorney General Chris Koster did not run for re-election to a third term in office, but was instead the unsuccessful Democratic nominee for Governor.

== Democratic primary ==
=== Candidates ===
==== Declared ====
- Teresa Hensley, former Cass County Prosecuting Attorney and nominee for MO-04 in 2012
- Jake Zimmerman, St. Louis County Assessor, former state representative and former assistant attorney general

==== Withdrawn ====
- Scott Sifton, state senator (running for re-election)

==== Declined ====
- Jennifer Joyce, St. Louis Circuit Attorney
- Jason Kander, Missouri Secretary of State (running for the U.S. Senate)
- Chris Koster, incumbent Attorney General (running for Governor)
- Joe Maxwell, former lieutenant governor of Missouri
- Jean Peters Baker, Jackson County Prosecuting Attorney
- Mike Sanders, Jackson County Executive, former Jackson County Prosecuting Attorney and former chairman of the Missouri Democratic Party

=== Endorsements ===
Teresa Hensley
- The Kansas City Star
Jake Zimmerman
- St. Louis Post-Dispatch

=== Polling ===
Poll source	Date(s) administered	Sample size	Margin of error	Teresa Hensley	Jake Zimmerman	Undecided
SurveyUSA	July 20–24, 2016	500	± 4.4%	41%	39%	20%
Remington Research Group (R)/Missouri Scout	July 15–16, 2016	1,119	± 3.0%	26%	41%	33%
Remington Research Group (R)	September 18–19, 2015	1,589	± 2.4%	27%	23%	51%

=== Results ===
Democratic primary results
Party	Candidate	Votes	%
Democratic	Teresa Hensley	167,626	52.7
Democratic	Jake Zimmerman	150,322	47.3
Total votes		317,948	100.0

== Republican primary ==
=== Candidates ===
==== Declared ====
- Josh Hawley, law professor at University of Missouri School of Law and former clerk for United States Supreme Court Chief Justice John Roberts
- Kurt Schaefer, state senator

==== Declined ====
- Catherine Hanaway, former Speaker of the Missouri House of Representatives and former U.S. Attorney for the Eastern District of Missouri (running for governor)
- Tim Jones, Speaker of the Missouri House of Representatives
- Eric Schmitt, state senator (running for state treasurer)

==== Controversy ====
Allegations of abuse of office by Missouri attorney general candidate Kurt Schaefer have surfaced: Schaefer allegedly pressured the former University of Missouri System President Tim Wolfe to interfere with Josh Hawley's ability to run for attorney general. Hawley was a professor at the University of Missouri. Wolfe wrote in a January 19 email: "Schaefer had several meetings with me pressuring me to take away Josh Hawley's right to run for Attorney General by taking away an employee's right to ask for an unpaid leave of absence when running for public office." The email went on to say he was worried that Schaefer might influence cuts in the university's budget due to political fallout if he did not do as Schaefer asked.

=== Endorsements ===
Josh Hawley
- Kit Bond, former governor of Missouri and U.S. senator
- National Review
- St. Louis Post-Dispatch
- The Kansas City Star
- Missouri Farm Bureau
- Missouri Pork Association
- American Conservative Union
- Citizens United
Kurt Schaefer
- Missouri State Troopers Association

=== Polling ===
Poll source	Date(s) administered	Sample size	Margin of error	Josh Hawley	Kurt Schaefer	Undecided
SurveyUSA	July 20–24, 2016	773	± 3.6%	34%	39%	28%
Remington Research Group (R)/Missouri Scout	July 7–8, 2016	1,022	± 3.0%	30%	28%	42%
Remington Research Group (R)/Missouri Scout	June 17–18, 2016	963	± 3.2%	21%	28%	51%
Remington Research Group (R)/Missouri Scout	May 13–14, 2016	1,421	± 2.7%	18%	23%	58%
Remington Research Group (R)/Missouri Scout	March 10–12, 2016	1,704	± 2.5%	12%	24%	64%
Remington Research Group (R)/Missouri Scout	October 23–24, 2015	1,033	± 3.0%	12%	19%	69%
Remington Research Group (R)/Missouri Scout	June 18–19, 2015	1,130	± 3.0%	9%	16%	75%
Remington Research Group (R)/Missouri Scout	April 3–4, 2015	621	± 3.9%	10%	15%	75%

=== Results ===
Republican primary results
Party	Candidate	Votes	%
Republican	Josh Hawley	415,702	64.2
Republican	Kurt Schaefer	231,657	35.8
Total votes		647,359	100.0

== General election ==
=== Predictions ===
Source	Ranking
Governing	Tossup

=== Polling ===
Poll source	Date(s) administered	Sample size	Margin of error	Teresa Hensley (D)	Josh Hawley (R)	Undecided
The Missouri Times/Remington Research Group (R)	September 19–20, 2016	1,076	± 3.2%	38%	47%	15%
Remington Research Group (R)	September 1–2, 2016	1,275	± 3.0%	41%	47%	12%
Remington Research Group (R)	August 5–6, 2016	1,280	± 3%	44%	48%	8%
Remington Research Group (R)/Missouri Scout	April 15–16, 2016	1,281	± 3.0%	38%	38%	24%

=== Results ===
Results by state Senate District

Results by state House District

2016 Missouri Attorney General election
Party	Candidate	Votes	%	±%
Republican	Josh Hawley	1,607,550	58.50%	+17.71%
Democratic	Teresa Hensley	1,140,252	41.50%	−14.31%
Total votes		2,747,802	100.00%	N/A
Republican gain from Democratic				

==== By congressional district ====
Hawley won six of eight congressional districts.

District	Hensley	Hawley	Representative
1st	77%	23%	Lacy Clay
2nd	41%	59%	Ann Wagner
3rd	33%	67%	Blaine Luetkemeyer
4th	36%	64%	Vicky Hartzler
5th	57%	43%	Emanuel Cleaver
6th	36%	64%	Sam Graves
7th	28%	72%	Billy Long
8th	28%	72%	Jason Smith

== See also ==
- Missouri gubernatorial election, 2016
