= Brooke Harrington =

American economic sociologist (born 1968)

Elisabeth Brooke Harrington
- Born: October 30, 1968 (age 57)
- Occupation: professor of economic sociology

Academic work
- Notable works: Capital without Borders: Wealth Managers and the One Percent

Elisabeth Brooke Harrington (born 1968) is an American academic, scholar, author, and professor of economic sociology at Dartmouth College.

== Early life ==
In 1990, Harrington earned a bachelor's degree in English literature from Stanford University. In 1996, Harrington earned a master's degree in sociology from Harvard University, followed by a PhD degree in sociology there in 1999.

== Career ==
From 1999 to 2007, Harrington was assistant professor of Sociology and Public Policy at Brown University. From 2006 to 2009, she was a research fellow at the Max Planck Institute for the Study of Societies in Cologne. She was a professor of economic sociology at the Copenhagen Business School from 2010 to 2018.

In 2017, she faced legal difficulties with the authorities in Denmark about a visa dispute, even though she had been invited to speak as a guest lecturer to the Danish Parliament; the dispute ended eight months later when Denmark changed its laws.

She is an advocate against xenophobia.

In January 2019, she became a professor of sociology at Dartmouth College in Hanover, New Hampshire.

== Works ==
- Harrington, Brooke (1999). "Dollars for Difference: The 'Diversity Premium' in Investing Organizations". Harvard University, ProQuest Dissertations Publishing
- Harrington, Brooke (2007). "Capital and Community: Findings from the American Investment Craze of the 1990s". Economic Sociology: The European Electronic Newsletter. 8 (3): 19–25. hdl:11858/00-001M-0000-0028-4E89-8.
- Harrington, Brooke (2008). Pop Finance: Investment Clubs and the New Investor Populism. Princeton, New Jersey: Princeton University Press. ISBN 9780691128320.
- Harrington, Brooke, ed. (2009). Deception: From Ancient Empires to Internet Dating. Stanford, California: Stanford University Press. ISBN 9780804756495.
- Harrington, Brooke (2016). Capital without Borders: Wealth Managers and the One Percent. Cambridge, Massachusetts: Harvard University Press. ISBN 9780674743809.
- Harrington, Brooke (2024). Offshore: Stealth Wealth and the New Colonialism. New York City: W. W. Norton & Company. ISBN 9781324064954. OCLC 1418888778.
