= 1988 Missouri Attorney General election =

- November 8, 1988
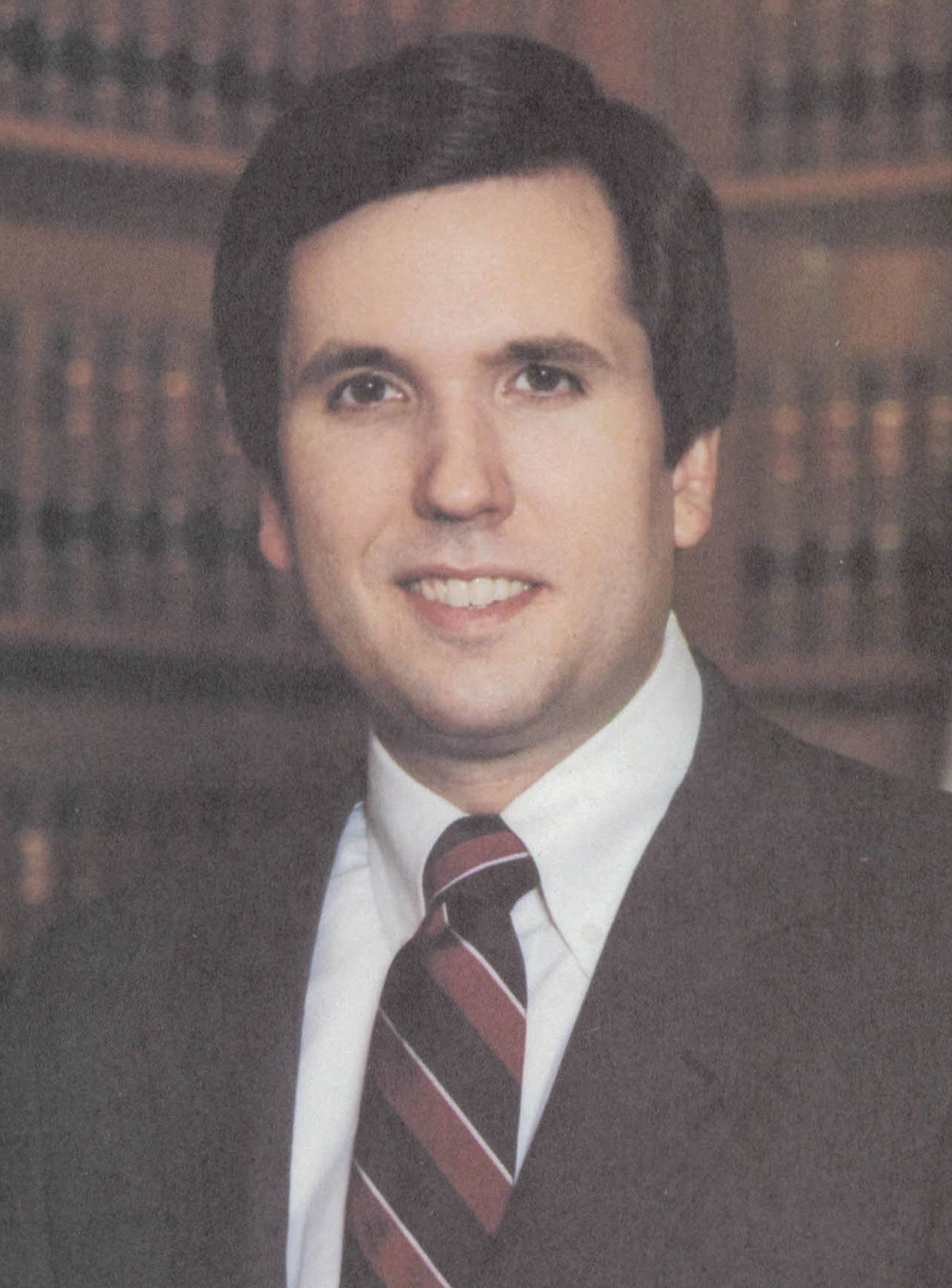

| Nominee | William L. Webster | Michael A. Wolff |
| Party | Republican | Democratic |
| Popular vote | 1,224,346 | 796,217 |
| Percentage | 60.59% | 39.41% |
- County results Webster: 50–60% 60–70% 70–80% Wolff: 50–60% 60–70%
Attorney General before election
William L. Webster
Republican
Elected Attorney General
William L. Webster
Republican

The 1988 Missouri Attorney General election was held on November 8, 1988, in order to elect the attorney general of Missouri. Republican nominee and incumbent attorney general William L. Webster defeated Democratic nominee Michael A. Wolff.

== General election ==
On election day, November 8, 1988, Republican nominee William L. Webster won re-election by a margin of 428,129 votes against his opponent Democratic nominee Michael A. Wolff, thereby retaining Republican control over the office of attorney general. Webster was sworn in for his second term on January 9, 1989.

=== Results ===
Missouri Attorney General election, 1988
| Party | Candidate | Votes | % |
|---|---|---|---|
| Republican | William L. Webster (incumbent) | 1,224,346 | 60.59 |
| Democratic | Michael A. Wolff | 796,217 | 39.41 |
| Total votes | | 2,020,563 | 100.00 |
| Republican hold | | | |

== See also ==
- 1988 Missouri gubernatorial election
