= Erin Hawley =

American lawyer and political activist

- Born: 1979 or 1980 (age 46–47); Folsom, New Mexico
- Education: Texas A&M University (BS); Yale University (Juris Doctor)
- Occupations: Lawyer; conservative activist
- Spouse: Josh Hawley (m. 2010)
- Children: 3

Erin Morrow Hawley (born 1979 or 1980) is an American lawyer and the wife of Senator Josh Hawley. She is known for her conservative political work and her affiliation with Lex Politica and Alliance Defending Freedom (ADF).

== Education ==
Hawley attended Texas A&M University, where she studied animal science. After college, she interned for the House Committee on Agriculture, which led to her interest in regulatory law.

Hawley received her Juris Doctor from Yale Law School, where she served as a Coker Fellow in Constitutional Law and worked on The Yale Law Journal.

== Career ==
As of February 2026, Hawley serves as Chair of the Supreme Court and Appellate Practice at Lex Politica, while remaining Of Counsel with Alliance Defending Freedom.

Before working with Lex Politica, Hawley practiced law with several law firms located in Washington D.C., including: Kirkland and Ellis, Bancroft PLLC, and King & Spalding.

Hawley previously worked as a law clerk for the U.S. Supreme Court Chief Justice John G. Roberts, as well as for the U.S. Court of Appeals for the Fourth Circuit, Judge J. Harvie Wilkinson. She also served as a counsel to Attorney General Michael Mukasey in the Department of Justice.

Hawley has taught at the University of Missouri as an associate professor, teaching constitutional litigation, federal income tax, tax policy, and agricultural law. She also worked at the Kinder Institute for Constitutional Democracy where she taught constitutional law as a senior fellow.

== Political positions and activism ==
In 2014, she joined a lawsuit challenging California's new requirement of increased enclosure size for hens whose eggs were to be sold in the state. Missouri sold a third of its eggs to California at the time of the lawsuit, and Hawley believed that a Democratic state didn't have the legal right to impose its values and rules on Missouri’s farmers.

Hawley opposes abortion. Hawley was part of the team that worked on the landmark case, Dobbs v. Jackson Women's Health Organization (2022), which overturned Roe v. Wade and Planned Parenthood v. Casey. She was involved in another Supreme Court case, 303 Creative LLC v. Elenis (2023). In 2024, Hawley presented a case to the Supreme Court against the FDA's approval of mifepristone, stating that the medication is a danger to women. Hawley argued that "federal approval of the abortion pill went forward without enough consideration of possible side effects and dangers, and that subsequent changes to enable greater access ignored health risks to women". In the same year, she signed the paperwork for Alliance Defending Freedom's representation of the Idaho Attorney General in Moyle v. United States.

In 2014, Hawley wrote an amicus brief on behalf of the Independent Women’s Forum, a conservative women's organization, for landmark case Burwell v. Hobby Lobby. The brief was written in favor of Hobby Lobby’s owners who, for religious reasons, refused to offer contraception coverage to their employees. She also wrote amicus briefs for two Supreme Court cases: Zubik v. Burwell (2016) and Espinoza v. Montana Department of Revenue (2020).

== Personal life ==
She met her husband, U.S. Senator Josh Hawley, while they were both working as law clerks for Chief Justice Roberts in 2007. They married in 2010. The Hawleys have three children.

Hawley is Christian.
