= The Tyranny of Big Tech =

2021 book by Josh Hawley

- Author: Josh Hawley
- Language: English
- Publisher: Regnery Publishing
- Publication date: May 4, 2021
- Publication place: United States
- Media type: Print
- Pages: 320
- ISBN: 978-1982138912 hardcover

The Tyranny of Big Tech is a 2021 book written by Senator Josh Hawley of Missouri. The book's claim is that Facebook, Google, Amazon and Apple (Big Tech) are the "gravest threat to American liberty since the monopolies of the Gilded age" because of their anti-conservative bias. Hawley says that he is fighting to "recover America's populist democracy". The book's original publisher, Simon & Schuster, cancelled the contract on January 7, 2021 after the storming of the United States Capitol on January 6 and Hawley's rejection of electoral votes in the 2020 United States presidential election. Regnery Publishing acquired the book on January 18 with a May 4 release date.

== Background ==
On October 16, 2020, Simon & Schuster announced they would publish The Tyranny of Big Tech. In a statement, Hawley said:

“At a time when these platforms are determining elections, banning inconvenient political views, lining politicians’ pockets with hundreds of millions of dollars, and addicting our kids to screens, I want to draw attention to the robber barons of the modern era, this is the fight to recover America's populist democracy. That is why I am writing this book.”

On January 7, one day after the 2021 storming of the United States Capitol, Simon and Schuster retracted the publication of Hawley's book stating that "after witnessing the disturbing, deadly insurrection that took place on Wednesday in Washington, D.C., [we have] decided to cancel publication of The Tyranny of Big Tech." Additionally, the company expressed how they "cannot support Senator Hawley after his role in what became a dangerous threat to our democracy and freedom." Hawley rebuked the decision on Twitter, describing the action as "Orwellian." Hawley also defended his actions as "representing [his] constituents" and that he would "see [Simon and Schuster] in court" for breach of contract and restricting his First Amendment rights.

On January 18, conservative publisher Regnery Publishing picked up the book. In a press release, Regnery’s president, Thomas Spence released a statement saying that “[i]t’s discouraging to see them cower before the ‘woke mob,’ as Senator Hawley correctly calls it. Regnery is proud to stand in the breach with him. And the warning in his book about censorship obviously couldn’t be more urgent.” The book was published in May 2021 and quickly became a best seller.

== Criticism ==
The book's contents have faced significant criticism from liberals and progressives.

In a review for Wired, Gilad Edelman wrote that the book is "an interesting story, and Hawley tells it well. The trouble is that it gets almost every important thing wrong." Edelman argued the book contained factual errors, such as the claim that the Clayton Act of 1914 established the Federal Trade Commission. The FTC was actually established via a separate piece of legislation. Edelman likened Hawley's suggestion that "the Clayton Act was a gift to big business" to "saying the Violence Against Women Act was a gift to wife beaters." Edelman also criticized Hawley's failure to consider the history of antitrust policy during "the rest of the 20th century" after the Wilson administration and accused Hawley of ignoring "the long period during which the government did fight corporate concentration."

Joshua Stein argued that the book's "only value... is as an illustration of the ideological tension in the American right." He described this tension as a simultaneous belief in "unfettered capitalism" for corporations and in the view "that the government should restrict the speech and activities of those corporations when [their] speech is out of step with the right-wing positioning in the culture wars." Stein called the book's argument "under-developed" and accused Hawley "of testing out messaging for a presidential campaign," meaning that the book is "insincere by conceit." Stein also accused Hawley of "limiting the focus of [his] proposals merely to the technology companies he doesn’t like, rather than applying them broadly." This bias, Stein claimed, is illustrated by Hawley's "sense of grievance" and his tendency "to play the victim" throughout the book.
