= 1960 Missouri Attorney General election =

- November 8, 1960
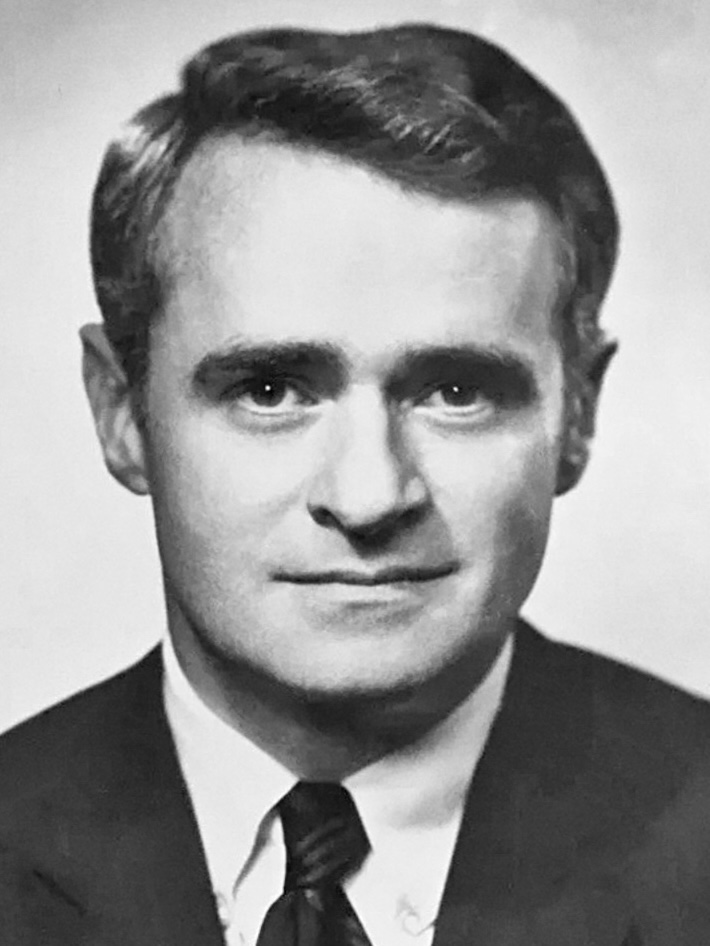

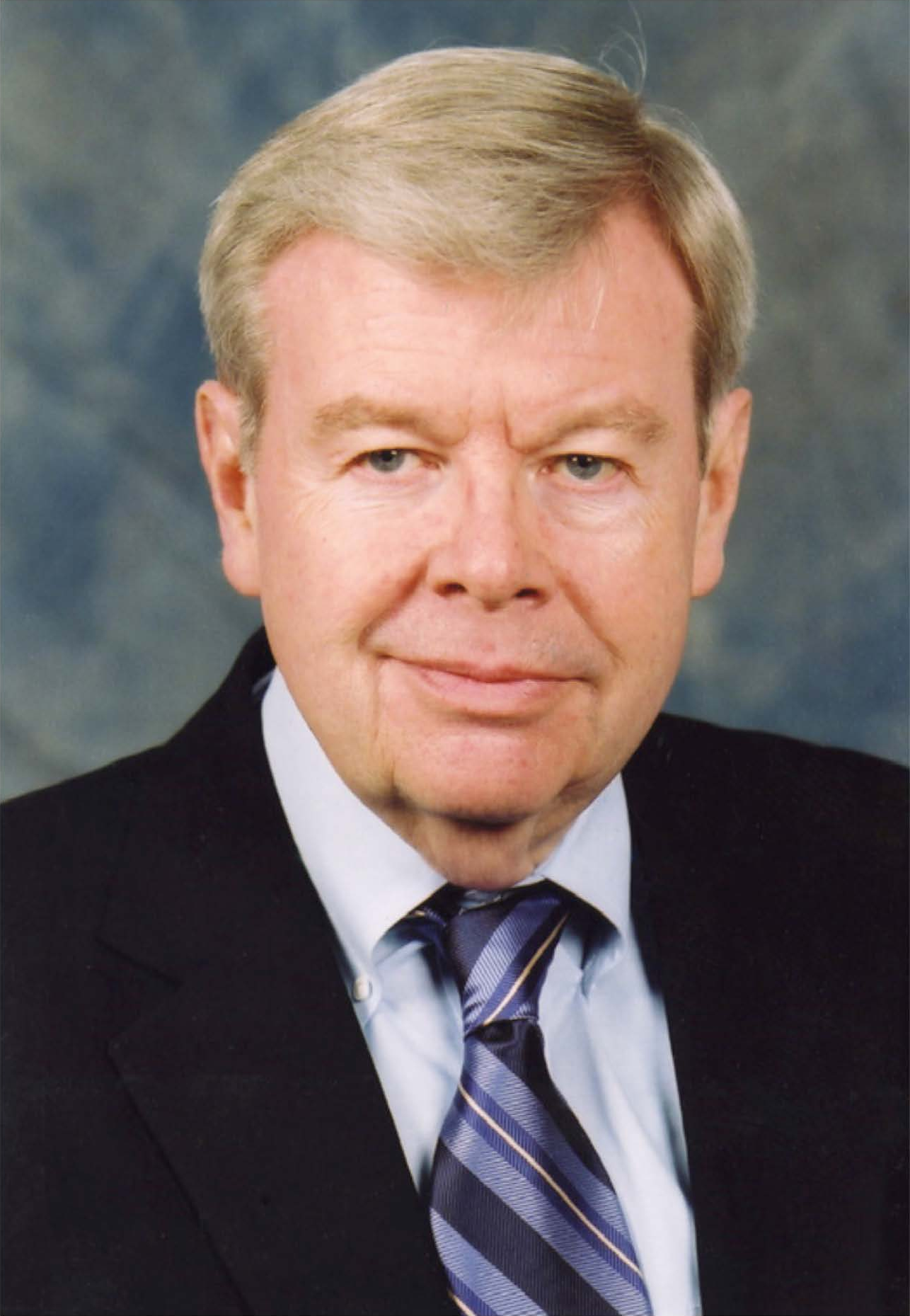
Nominee	Thomas Eagleton	Donald J. Stohr
Party	Democratic	Republican
Popular vote	1,076,074	792,242
Percentage	57.60%	42.40%
Attorney General before election
John M. Dalton
Democratic
Elected Attorney General
Thomas Eagleton
Democratic

The 1960 Missouri Attorney General election was held on November 8, 1960, in order to elect the attorney general of Missouri. Democratic nominee Thomas Eagleton defeated Republican nominee Donald J. Stohr.

== General election ==
On election day, November 8, 1960, Democratic nominee Thomas Eagleton won the election by a margin of 283,832 votes against his opponent Republican nominee Donald J. Stohr, thereby retaining Democratic control over the office of attorney general. Eagleton was sworn in as the 35th attorney general of Missouri on January 9, 1961.

=== Results ===
Missouri Attorney General election, 1960
Party	Candidate	Votes	%
Democratic	Thomas Eagleton	1,076,074	57.60
Republican	Donald J. Stohr	792,242	42.40
Total votes		1,868,316	100.00
Democratic hold			

== See also ==
- 1960 Missouri gubernatorial election
