= 1968 United States Senate election in Missouri =

- November 5, 1968
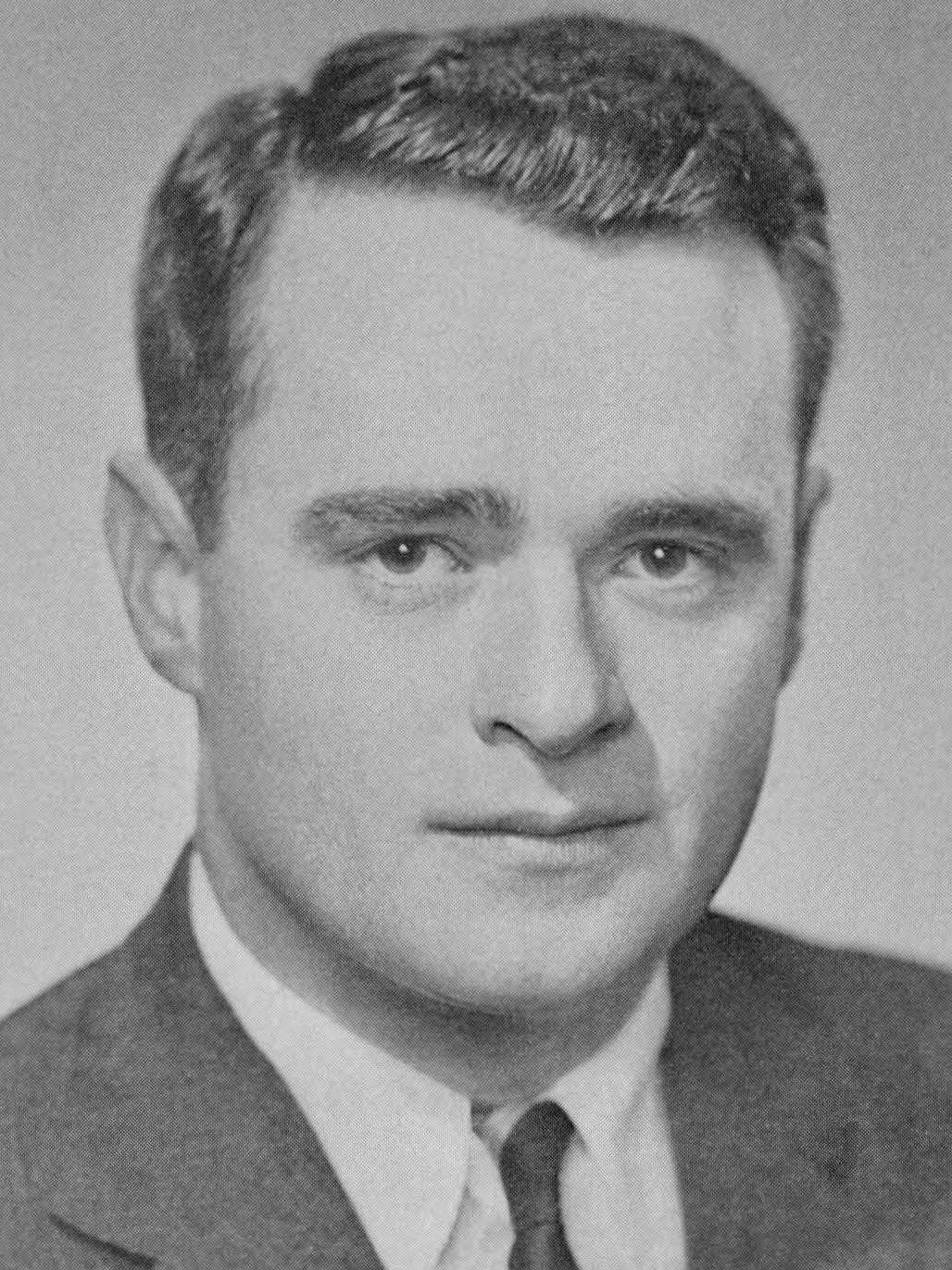

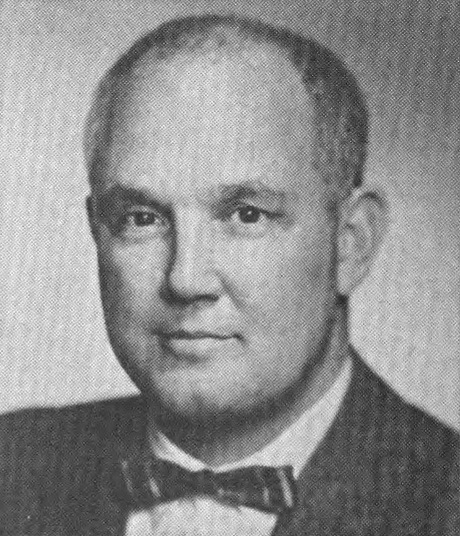
Nominee	Thomas Eagleton	Thomas B. Curtis
Party	Democratic	Republican
Popular vote	887,414	850,544
Percentage	51.06%	48.94%
- County results Eagleton: 50–60% 60–70% Curtis: 50–60% 60–70% 70–80%
U.S. senator before election
Edward V. Long
Democratic
Elected U.S. Senator
Thomas Eagleton
Democratic

The 1968 United States Senate election in Missouri took place on November 5, 1968.

Incumbent Democratic Senator Edward V. Long was defeated in the Democratic primary by Lieutenant Governor Thomas Eagleton. Eagleton narrowly defeated Republican U.S. Representative Thomas B. Curtis in the general election.

== Primary elections ==
Primary elections were held on August 6, 1968.

=== Democratic primary ===
==== Candidates ====
- W. True Davis Jr., former Assistant Secretary of the Treasury
- Thomas Eagleton, Lieutenant Governor
- Beverly Kitching
- Edward V. Long, incumbent U.S. Senator
- Lee C. Sutton, former member of the Missouri House of Representatives
- William McKinley Thomas, perennial candidate

==== Results ====
Eagleton: 30–40%; 40–50%; 50–60%; 60–70%; 70–80%; Long: 30–40%; 40–50%; 50–60%; 60–70%; Davis: 30–40%; 40–50%; 50–60%; 60–70%; 70–80%

Democratic primary results
Party	Candidate	Votes	%
Democratic	Thomas Eagleton	224,017	36.65
Democratic	Edward V. Long (incumbent)	198,901	32.54
Democratic	W. True Davis Jr.	178,961	29.28
Democratic	William McKinley Thomas	4,879	0.80
Democratic	Lee C. Sutton	2,475	0.40
Democratic	Beverly Kitching	2,044	0.33
Total votes		611,277	100.00

=== Republican primary ===
==== Candidates ====
- Thomas B. Curtis, U.S. Representative
- Morris D. Duncan, unsuccessful candidate for Republican nomination for Senate in 1962 and 1964
- Forest Nave Jr., Republican nominee for Missouri's 4th congressional district in 1966

==== Results ====
Republican primary results
Party	Candidate	Votes	%
Republican	Thomas B. Curtis	192,028	84.52
Republican	Morris D. Duncan	24,418	10.75
Republican	Forest Nave Jr.	10,746	4.73
Total votes		227,192	100.00

== General election ==
=== Results ===
1968 United States Senate election in Missouri
Party	Candidate	Votes	%
Democratic	Thomas Eagleton	887,414	51.06
Republican	Thomas B. Curtis	850,544	48.94
Majority		36,870	2.12
Turnout		1,737,958	
Democratic hold			

== See also ==
- 1968 United States Senate elections

== Bibliography ==
- Congressional Elections, 1946-1996. Washington, D.C.: Congressional Quarterly. 1998. ISBN 1-56802-248-4.
- Scammon, Richard M., ed. (1970). America Votes 8: a handbook of contemporary American election statistics, 1968. Washington, D.C.: Governmental Affairs Institute.
- Goodwin, Thelma P., ed. (1969). Official State of Missouri Manual for the years 1969-70. Jefferson City and St. Louis, Missouri: Von Hoffmann Press, Inc.
