= 1956 Missouri Attorney General election =

- November 6, 1956
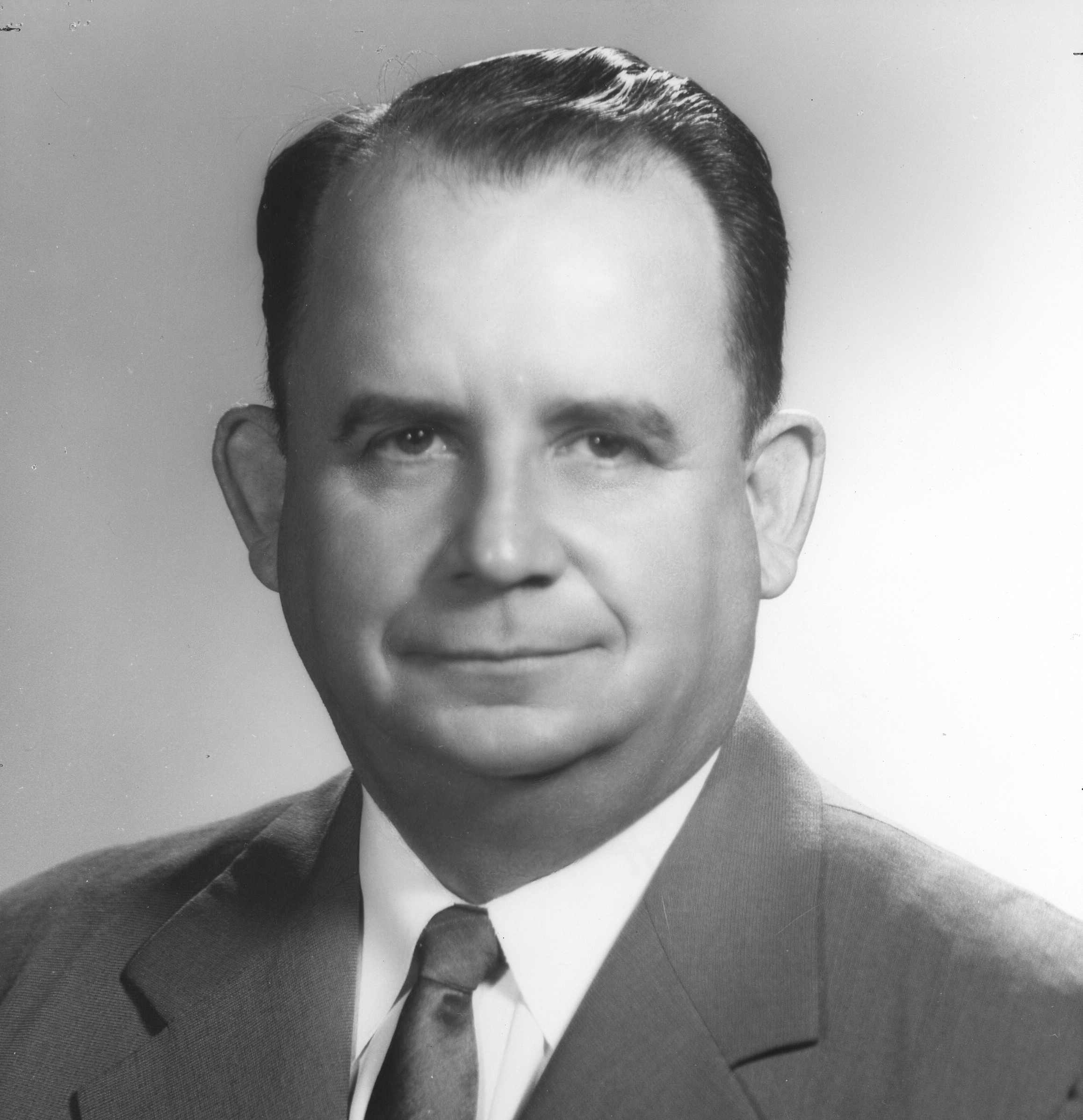

Nominee	John M. Dalton	Vincent E. Baker
Party	Democratic	Republican
Popular vote	987,111	802,561
Percentage	55.16%	44.84%
Attorney General before election
John M. Dalton
Democratic
Elected Attorney General
John M. Dalton
Democratic

The 1956 Missouri Attorney General election was held on November 6, 1956, in order to elect the attorney general of Missouri. Democratic nominee and incumbent attorney general John M. Dalton defeated Republican nominee and incumbent member of the Missouri Senate Vincent E. Baker.

== General election ==
On election day, November 6, 1956, Democratic nominee John M. Dalton won re-election by a margin of 184,550 votes against his opponent Republican nominee Vincent E. Baker, thereby retaining Democratic control over the office of attorney general. Dalton was sworn in for his second term on January 14, 1957.

=== Results ===
Missouri Attorney General election, 1956
Party	Candidate	Votes	%
Democratic	John M. Dalton (incumbent)	987,111	55.16
Republican	Vincent E. Baker	802,561	44.84
Total votes		1,789,672	100.00
Democratic hold			

== See also ==
- 1956 Missouri gubernatorial election
