= Senator Webster (disambiguation) =

Daniel Webster (1782–1852) was a U.S. Senator from Massachusetts from 1845 to 1850. Senator Webster may also refer to:

- Alexander Webster (New York politician) (1734–1810), New York State Senate
- Charlie Webster (politician) (fl. 1980s–2010s), Maine State Senate
- Daniel Webster (Florida politician) (born 1949), Florida State Senate
- Ebenezer Webster (1739–1806), New Hampshire State Senate
- Edwin Hanson Webster (1829–1893), Maryland State Senate
- Hugh Webster (politician) (1943–2022), North Carolina State Senate
- Richard M. Webster (1922–1990), Missouri State Senate
- Scott Webster (politician) (fl. 2020s), Iowa State Senate
- Stephen W. Webster (born 1943), Vermont State Senate
