= 1964 Missouri lieutenant gubernatorial election =

- November 3, 1964
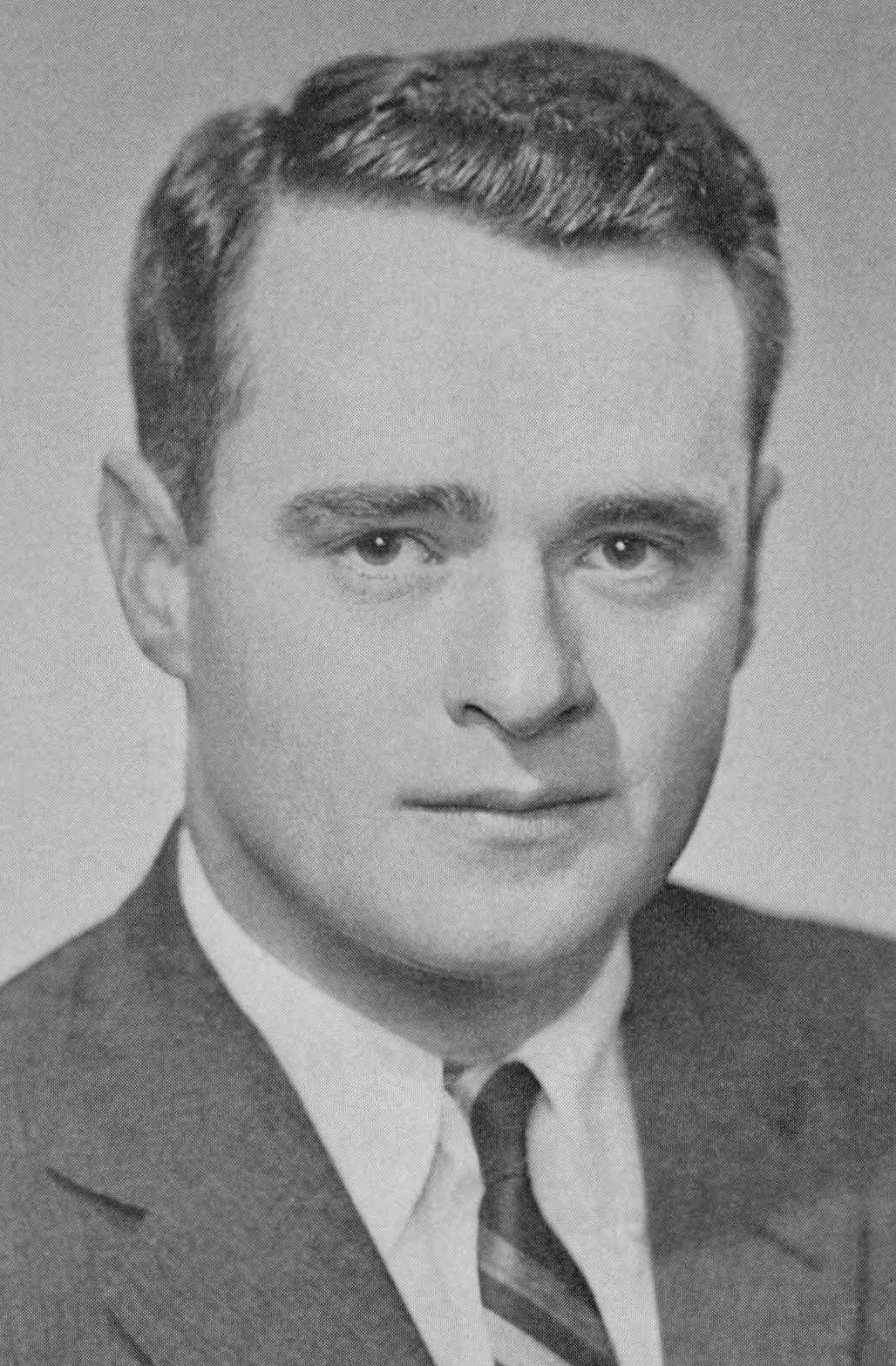

| Nominee | Thomas Eagleton | Jewett M. Fulkerson |
| Party | Democratic | Republican |
| Popular vote | 1,142,977 | 621,335 |
| Percentage | 64.78% | 35.22% |
- County results Eagleton: 50–60% 60–70% 70–80% 80–90% Fulkerson: 50–60% 60–70%
Lieutenant Governor before election
Hilary A. Bush
Democratic
Elected Lieutenant Governor
Thomas Eagleton
Democratic

The 1964 Missouri lieutenant gubernatorial election was held on November 3, 1964. Democratic nominee Thomas Eagleton defeated Republican nominee Jewett M. Fulkerson with 64.78% of the vote.

== Primary elections ==
Primary elections were held on August 4, 1964.

=== Democratic primary ===
==== Candidates ====
- Thomas Eagleton, Missouri Attorney General
- Willard R. McDonald
- Scott Ousley

==== Results ====
Democratic primary results
| Party | Candidate | Votes | % |
|---|---|---|---|
| Democratic | Thomas Eagleton | 432,733 | 78.65 |
| Democratic | Willard R. McDonald | 89,123 | 16.20 |
| Democratic | Scott Ousley | 28,366 | 5.16 |
| Total votes | | 550,222 | 100.00 |

== General election ==
=== Candidates ===
- Thomas Eagleton, Democratic
- Jewett M. Fulkerson, Republican

=== Results ===
1964 Missouri lieutenant gubernatorial election
| Party | Candidate | Votes | % | ±% |
|---|---|---|---|---|
| Democratic | Thomas Eagleton | 1,142,977 | 64.78% | |
| Republican | Jewett M. Fulkerson | 621,335 | 35.22% | |
| Majority | | 237,834 | | |
| Turnout | | | | |
| Democratic hold | | Swing | | |
