= 1952 Missouri Attorney General election =

- November 4, 1952
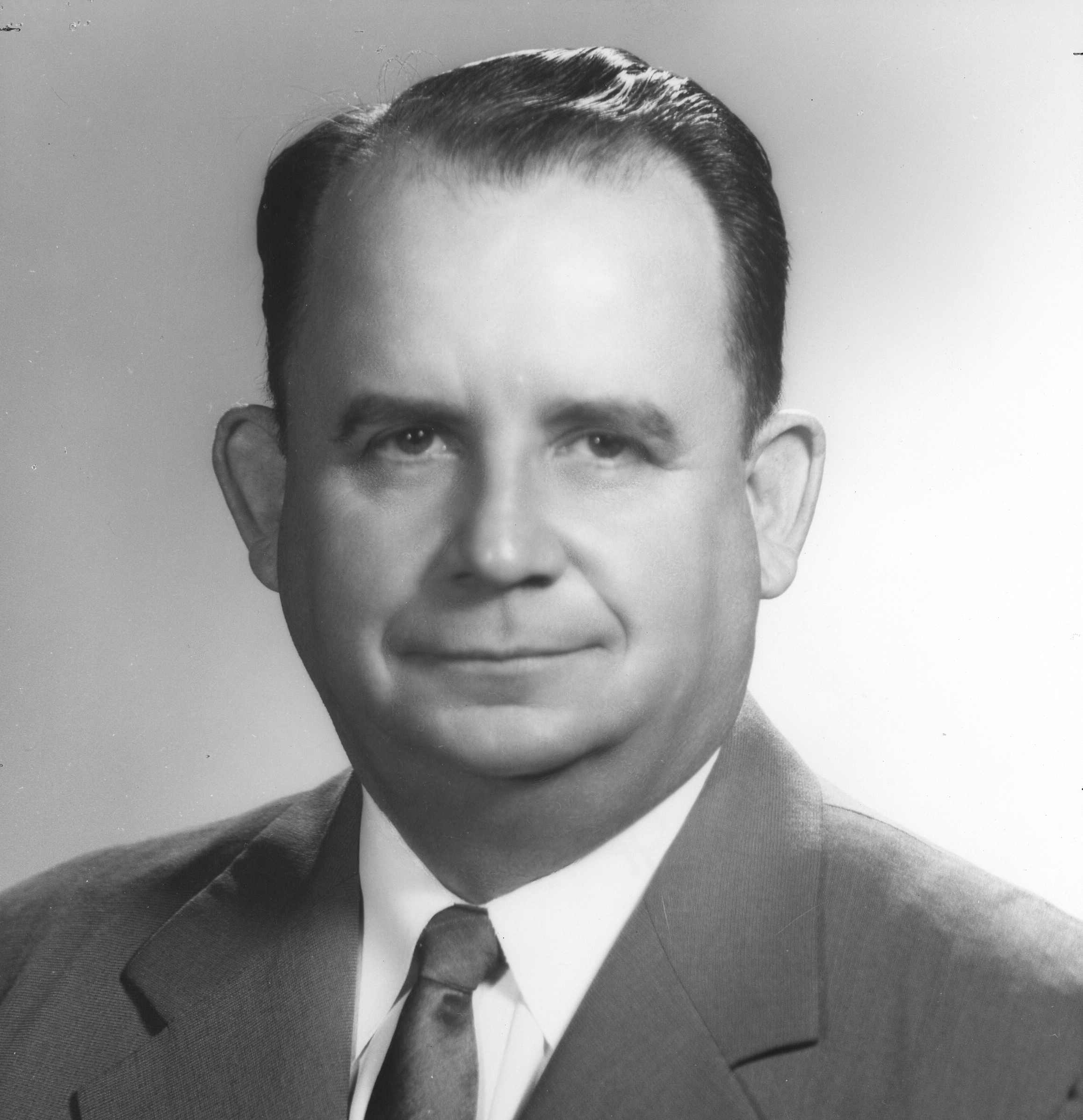

Nominee	John M. Dalton	Richard M. Webster
Party	Democratic	Republican
Popular vote	964,507	889,868
Percentage	52.01%	47.99%
Attorney General before election
Jonathan E. Taylor
Democratic
Elected Attorney General
John M. Dalton
Democratic

The 1952 Missouri Attorney General election was held on November 4, 1952, in order to elect the attorney general of Missouri. Democratic nominee John M. Dalton defeated Republican nominee and former speaker of the Missouri House of Representatives Richard M. Webster.

== General election ==
On election day, November 4, 1952, Democratic nominee John M. Dalton won the election by a margin of 74,639 votes against his opponent Republican nominee Richard M. Webster, thereby retaining Democratic control over the office of attorney general. Dalton was sworn in as the 34th attorney general of Missouri on January 12, 1953.

=== Results ===
Missouri Attorney General election, 1952
Party	Candidate	Votes	%
Democratic	John M. Dalton	964,507	52.01
Republican	Richard M. Webster	889,868	47.99
Total votes		1,854,375	100.00
Democratic hold			

== See also ==
- 1952 Missouri gubernatorial election
