= 1960 Missouri lieutenant gubernatorial election =

- November 8, 1960
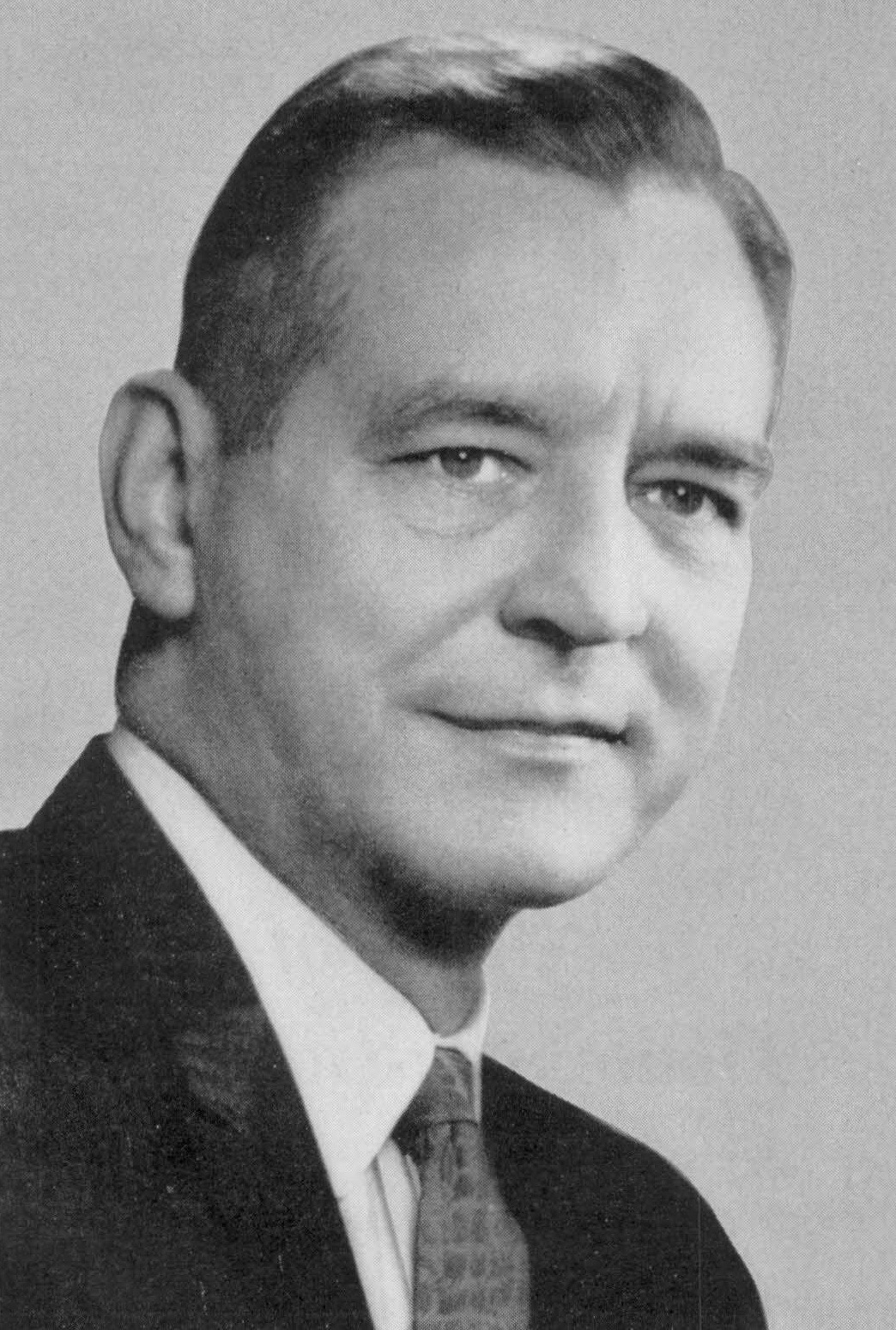

Nominee	Hilary A. Bush	Harry E. Hatcher
Party	Democratic	Republican
Popular vote	1,043,018	820,382
Percentage	55.97%	44.03%
- County results Bush: 50–60% 60–70% 70–80% Hatcher: 50–60% 60–70% 70–80%
Lieutenant Governor before election
Edward V. Long
Democratic
Elected Lieutenant Governor
Hilary A. Bush
Democratic

The 1960 Missouri lieutenant gubernatorial election was held on November 8, 1960. Democratic nominee Hilary A. Bush defeated Republican nominee Harry E. Hatcher with 55.97% of the vote.

== Primary elections ==
Primary elections were held on August 2, 1960.

=== Democratic primary ===
==== Candidates ====
- Edward V. Long, incumbent Lieutenant Governor
- Charles C. Shafer
- Michael J. Kennedy
- Lewis E. Morris

==== Results ====
Democratic primary results
Party	Candidate	Votes	%
Democratic	Edward V. Long	285,191	55.82
Democratic	Charles C. Shafer	103,255	20.21
Democratic	Michael J. Kennedy	93,268	18.26
Democratic	Lewis E. Morris	29,215	5.72
Total votes		510,929	100.00

=== Republican primary ===
==== Candidates ====
- Harry E. Hatcher, State Senator
- R. M. Battles

==== Results ====
Republican primary results
Party	Candidate	Votes	%
Republican	Harry E. Hatcher	123,290	66.11
Republican	R. M. Battles	63,202	33.89
Total votes		186,492	100.00

== General election ==
=== Candidates ===
- Hilary A. Bush, Democratic
- Harry E. Hatcher, Republican

=== Results ===
1960 Missouri lieutenant gubernatorial election
Party	Candidate	Votes	%	±%
Democratic	Hilary A. Bush	1,043,018	55.97%	
Republican	Harry E. Hatcher	820,382	44.03%	
Majority		222,636		
Turnout				
Democratic hold		Swing		
