= 1956 Missouri lieutenant gubernatorial election =

- November 6, 1956
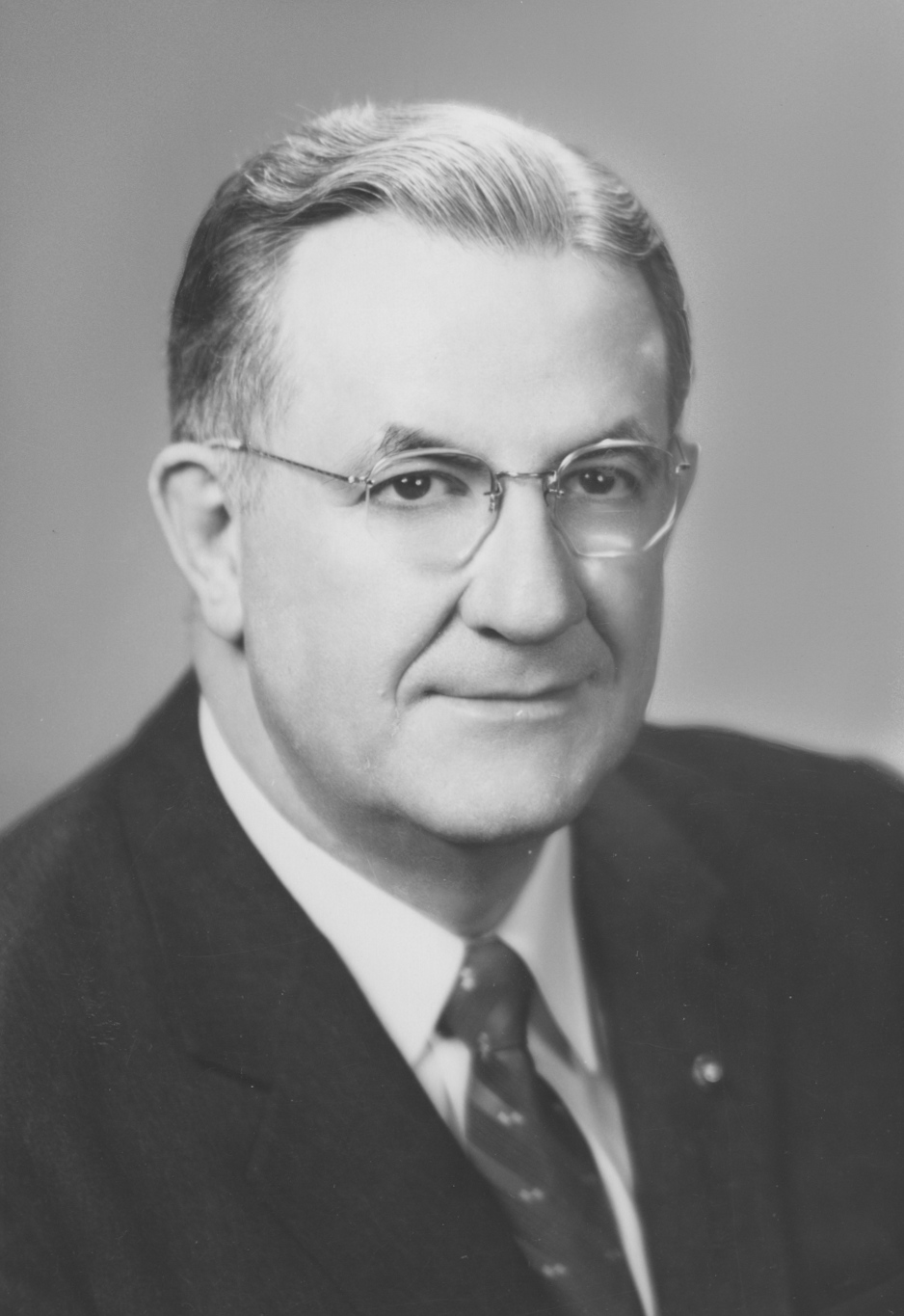

Nominee	Edward V. Long	Richard M. Webster
Party	Democratic	Republican
Popular vote	958,011	832,918
Percentage	53.49%	46.51%
- County results Long: 50–60% 60–70% 70–80% 80–90% Webster: 50–60% 60–70% 70–80%
Lieutenant Governor before election
James T. Blair Jr.
Democratic
Elected Lieutenant Governor
Edward V. Long
Democratic

The 1956 Missouri lieutenant gubernatorial election was held on November 6, 1956. Democratic nominee Edward V. Long defeated Republican nominee Richard M. Webster with 53.49% of the vote.

== Primary elections ==
Primary elections were held on August 7, 1956.

=== Democratic primary ===
==== Candidates ====
- Edward V. Long, State Senator
- Tom A. Shockley
- Harry E. Kemp
- Charles C. Hurst
- John Hosmer
- Samuel Van D. Williams

==== Results ====
Democratic primary results
Party	Candidate	Votes	%
Democratic	Edward V. Long	230,348	56.45
Democratic	Tom A. Shockley	57,484	14.09
Democratic	Harry E. Kemp	41,902	10.27
Democratic	Charles C. Hurst	34,918	8.56
Democratic	John Hosmer	27,021	6.62
Democratic	Samuel Van D. Williams	16,355	4.01
Total votes		408,028	100.00

== General election ==
=== Candidates ===
- Edward V. Long, Democratic
- Richard M. Webster, Republican

=== Results ===
1956 Missouri lieutenant gubernatorial election
Party	Candidate	Votes	%	±%
Democratic	Edward V. Long	958,011	53.49%	
Republican	Richard M. Webster	832,918	46.51%	
Majority		125,093		
Turnout				
Democratic hold		Swing		
