= Governor Blair =

Governor Blair may refer to:

- Austin Blair (1818–1894), 13th Governor of Michigan
- James T. Blair Jr. (1902–1962), 44th Governor of Missouri
