= Governor Dalton =

Governor Dalton may refer to:

- John M. Dalton (1900–1972), 45th Governor of Missouri
- John N. Dalton (1931–1986), 63rd Governor of Virginia
