= 1962 United States Senate election in Missouri =

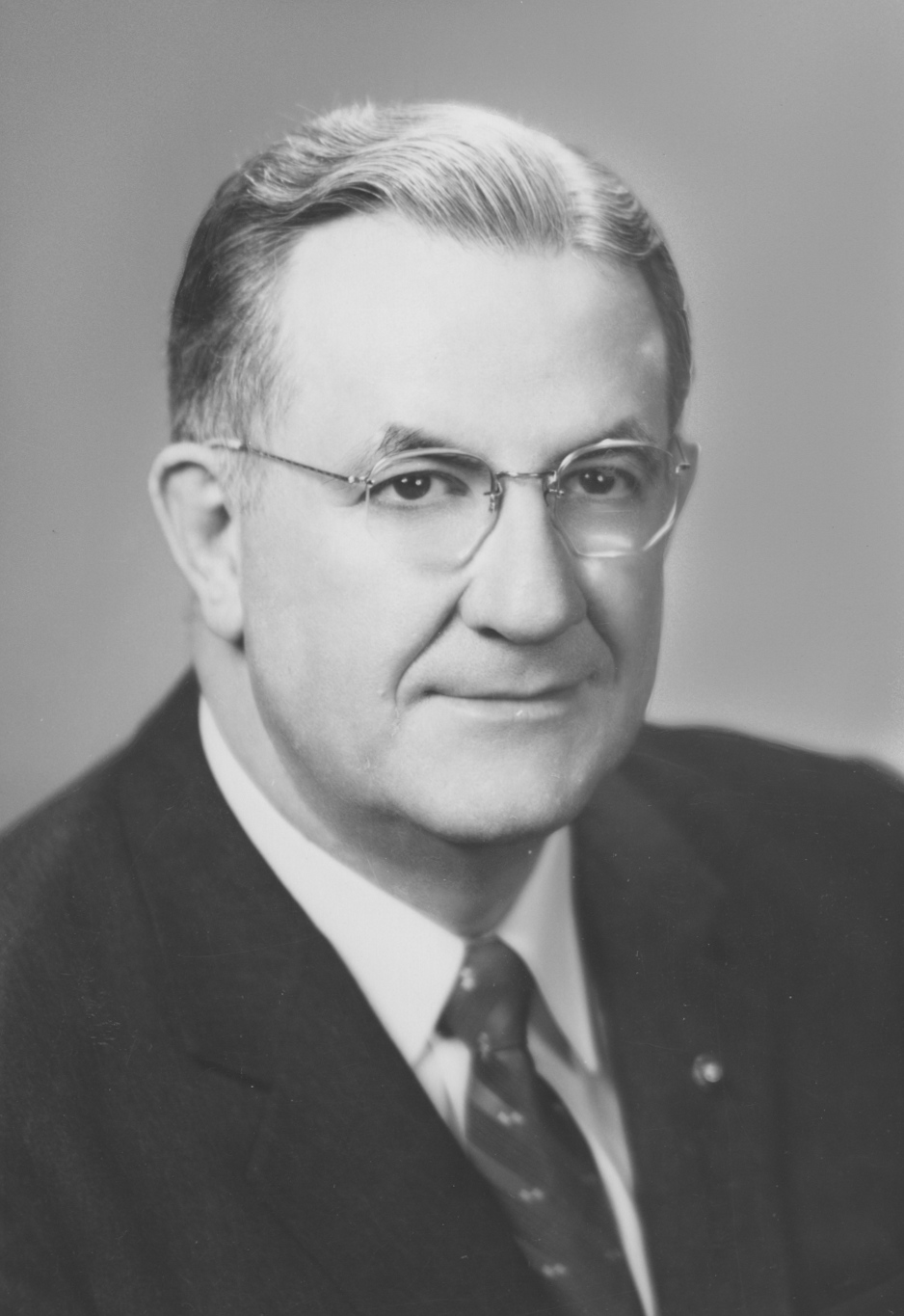

| Nominee | Edward V. Long | R. Crosby Kemper Jr. |
| Party | Democratic | Republican |
| Popular vote | 663,301 | 555,330 |
| Percentage | 54.43% | 45.57% |
- County results Long: 50–60% 60–70% 70–80% 80–90% Kemper: 50–60% 60–70% 70–80%
U.S. senator before election
Edward V. Long
Democratic
Elected U.S. senator
Edward V. Long
Democratic

The 1962 United States Senate election in Missouri took place on November 6, 1962, in Missouri. The incumbent Democratic Senator, Edward V. Long, was elected to a full term, having won a special election in 1960 to finish Thomas C. Hennings' term. He defeated Republican nominee R. Crosby Kemper Jr, winning 54.4% of the vote.

== Democratic primary ==
=== Candidates ===
- Edward V. Long, the incumbent Senator
- Lewis Morris, retired pharmaceutical engineer and former candidate for Lieutenant Governor of Missouri
- Joseph Hartmeier, plumber

=== Results ===
Democratic primary
| Party | Candidate | Votes | % |
|---|---|---|---|
| Democratic | Edward V. Long (incumbent) | 370,826 | 86.51 |
| Democratic | Lewis Morris | 37,507 | 8.75 |
| Democratic | Joseph Hartmeier | 20,313 | 4.74 |
| Total votes | | 428,646 | 100 |

== Republican primary ==
=== Candidates ===
- Duane Cox, attorney
- Morris Duncan, osteopath
- R. Crosby Kemper Jr, president of UMB Financial Corporation
- Douglas Ries, physician

=== Results ===
Republican primary
| Party | Candidate | Votes | % |
|---|---|---|---|
| Republican | R. Crosby Kemper Jr. | 119,136 | 66.64 |
| Republican | Duane Cox | 23,606 | 13.21 |
| Republican | Morris Duncan | 15,109 | 8.45 |
| Republican | William Thomas | 14,131 | 7.90 |
| Republican | Douglas Ries | 6,782 | 3.79 |
| Total votes | | 178,764 | 100 |

== Results ==
1962 United States Senate election in Missouri
| Party | Candidate | Votes | % | ±% |
|---|---|---|---|---|
| Democratic | Edward V. Long (incumbent) | 663,301 | 54.43 | +1.26 |
| Republican | R. Crosby Kemper Jr. | 555,330 | 45.57 | −1.26 |
| Majority | | 107,971 | 8.86 | |
| Turnout | | 1,218,631 | | |
| Democratic hold | | | | |
