= Thomas B. Curtis =

American politician (1911–1993)

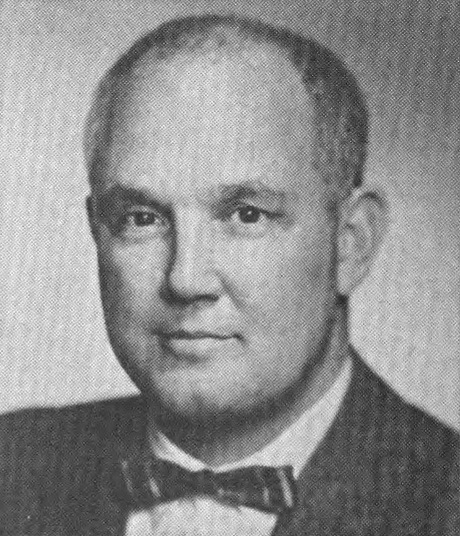

Member of the U.S. House of Representatives from Missouri
- In office January 3, 1951 – January 3, 1969
- Preceded by: Raymond W. Karst
- Succeeded by: James W. Symington
- Constituency: 12th district (1951–53); 2nd district (1953–69)

Personal details
- Born: May 14, 1911 St. Louis, Missouri, U.S.
- Died: January 10, 1993 (aged 81) Allegan, Michigan, U.S.
- Party: Republican
- Education: Washington University in St. Louis; Dartmouth College; Westminster College

Military service
- Allegiance: United States
- Branch/service: United States Navy
- Years of service: 1942–1945
- Battles/wars: World War II

Thomas Bradford Curtis (May 14, 1911 – January 10, 1993) was an American Republican politician from Missouri who represented suburban St. Louis County, Missouri for nine terms from 1951 to 1969. He was a primary driver behind the Civil Rights Act of 1964 and aggressive supporter of civil rights for black Americans throughout his career.

== Early life and education ==
Born in St. Louis, Missouri, Curtis attended the public schools of Webster Groves, Missouri. He attended Dartmouth College in Hanover, New Hampshire, where he was a member of Phi Sigma Kappa, earning an A.B. in 1932. He was admitted to the bar in 1934 and commenced the practice of law in St. Louis. He received an LL.B. degree from Washington University School of Law in 1935. He received an M.A. from Dartmouth in 1951, and a J.D. from Westminster College in 1964. He served during World War II in the United States Navy from April 8, 1942, until discharged as a lieutenant commander on December 21, 1945.

== Political career ==
Curtis served as member of the Board of Election Commissioners of St. Louis County in 1942. He served as member of the Missouri State Board of Law Examiners from 1947 to 1950. Curtis came from a family of Democrats but became a Republican in protest of Democratic bossism and the Kansas City Pendergast machine. Curtis was an early supporter of Robert A. Taft in 1948 and 1952 as the Republican frontrunner.

=== U.S. Representative ===
Curtis was elected as a Republican to the Eighty-second and to the eight succeeding Congresses (January 3, 1951 – January 3, 1969).

The Civil Rights Act of 1964 originated in Curtis' office in October 1962, and it was mainly Republican pressure from Curtis and his fellow Republican Judiciary Committee member William McCulloch of Ohio that forced John F. Kennedy to make his first, hesitant message on civil rights in April 1963. Curtis' defense of civil rights was rooted partly in the Lincoln tradition of the GOP, but more simply in the belief that civil rights were at the base of the American philosophy of government and Judeo-Christian morality and that their defense was "the most fundamental issue that confronts any government at any time," as he wrote in 1952.

Curtis did not sign the 1956 Southern Manifesto, and voted in favor of the Civil Rights Acts of 1957, 1960, 1964, and 1968, and the Voting Rights Act of 1965, but voted against the 24th Amendment to the U.S. Constitution. Up until the mid-1960s, Curtis had been an opponent of the military draft.

He was not a candidate for reelection in 1968 to the House of Representatives but was an unsuccessful candidate for election to the United States Senate, losing to Democrat Thomas Eagleton by a 51% to 49% margin.

Curtis was a noted economist, considered by most Republicans and some Democrats to be the most knowledgeable and insightful economist in Washington during his tenure as a Member of Congress.

=== After Congress ===
He served as delegate to the Republican National Convention in 1964, 1976 and 1980. He served as vice president and general counsel, Encyclopædia Britannica, from 1969 to 1973. He was an unsuccessful candidate for the United States Senate again in 1974, winning only 39% of the vote against incumbent Thomas Eagleton. He served as chairman of the Corporation for Public Broadcasting from 1972 to 1973. He served as chairman of the Federal Election Commission from April 1975 to May 1976. He endorsed Ronald Reagan over President Gerald Ford during the 1976 Republican primaries. He was a consultant for the National Association of Technical and Trade Schools from 1984 until his death in 1993.

== Death ==
Curtis was a resident of Pier Cove, Michigan, until his death in Allegan, Michigan, on January 10, 1993.

Party political offices
Preceded by R. Crosby Kemper Jr.	Republican nominee for U.S. Senator from Missouri (Class 3); 1968, 1974	Succeeded by Gene McNary
U.S. House of Representatives
Preceded by Raymond W. Karst	Member of the U.S. House of Representatives from Missouri's 12th congressional district 1951–1953	Succeeded by District eliminated
Preceded by Morgan M. Moulder	Member of the U.S. House of Representatives from Missouri's 2nd congressional district 1953–1969	Succeeded by James W. Symington
