= 1952 Missouri lieutenant gubernatorial election =

- November 4, 1952
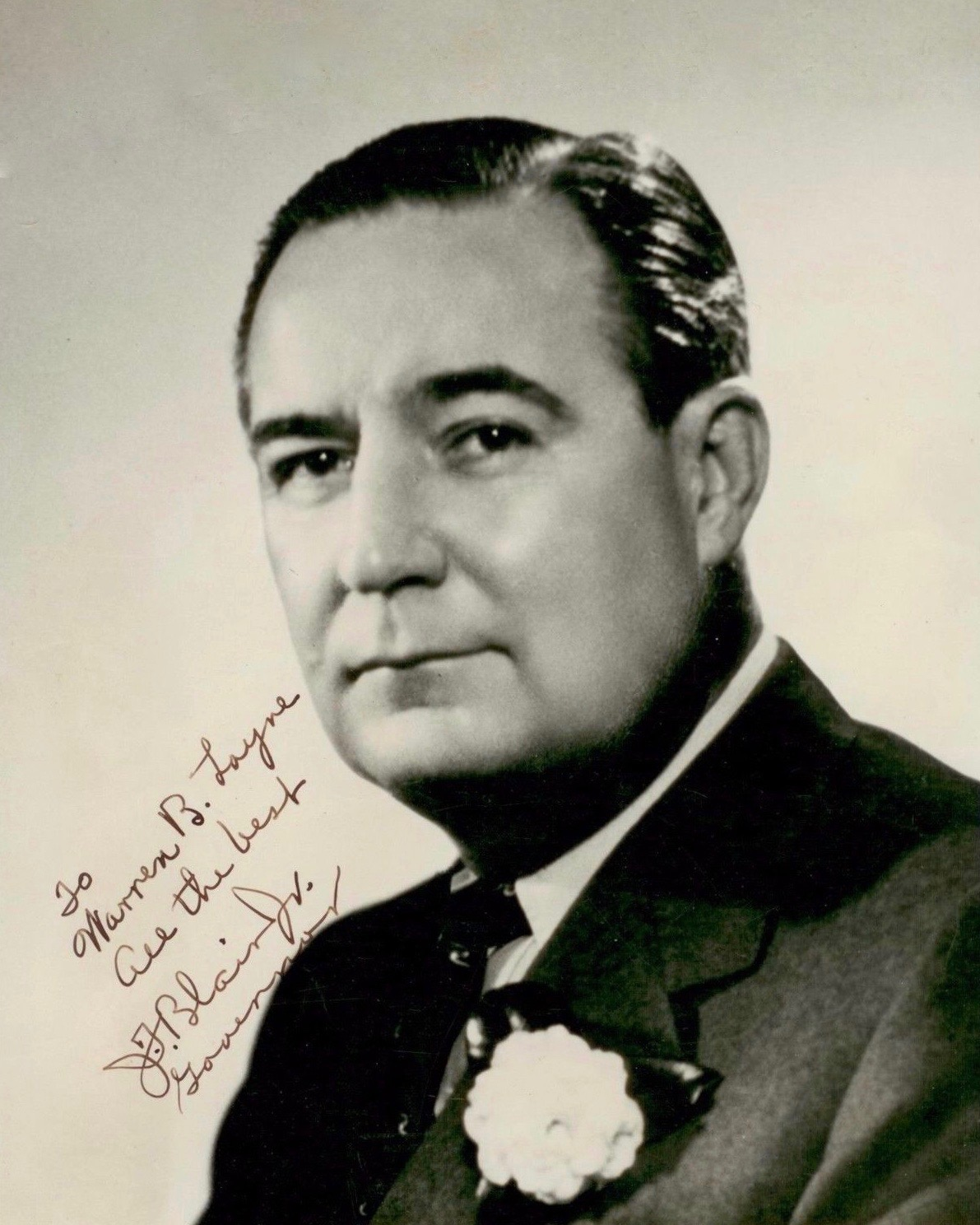

Nominee	James T. Blair Jr.	Henry Arthur
Party	Democratic	Republican
Popular vote	987,906	869,155
Percentage	53.16%	46.77%
Lieutenant Governor before election
James T. Blair Jr.
Democratic
Elected Lieutenant Governor
James T. Blair Jr.
Democratic

The 1952 Missouri lieutenant gubernatorial election was held on November 4, 1952. Democratic incumbent James T. Blair Jr. defeated Republican nominee Henry Arthur with 53.16% of the vote.

== Primary elections ==
Primary elections were held on August 5, 1952.

=== Democratic primary ===
==== Candidates ====
- James T. Blair Jr., incumbent Lieutenant Governor
- William J. Becker

==== Results ====
Democratic primary results
Party	Candidate	Votes	%
Democratic	James T. Blair Jr. (incumbent)	419,703	74.25
Democratic	William J. Becker	145,570	25.75
Total votes		565,273	100.00

=== Republican primary ===
==== Candidates ====
- Henry Arthur
- Harry E. Kemp
- Thomas G. Woolsey

==== Results ====
Republican primary results
Party	Candidate	Votes	%
Republican	Henry Arthur	141,147	41.93
Republican	Harry E. Kemp	130,635	38.80
Republican	Thomas G. Woolsey	64,879	19.27
Total votes		565,273	100.00

== General election ==
=== Candidates ===
Major party candidates

- James T. Blair Jr., Democratic
- Henry Arthur, Republican

Other candidates

- Sol Derman, Progressive
- E. F. Moore, Socialist
- O. M. Tanner, Christian Nationalist
- R. H. Shadwell, Socialist Labor

=== Results ===
1952 Missouri lieutenant gubernatorial election
Party	Candidate	Votes	%	±%
Democratic	James T. Blair Jr. (incumbent)	987,906	53.16%	
Republican	Henry Arthur	869,155	46.77%	
Progressive	Sol Derman	846	0.05%	
Socialist	E. F. Moore	247	0.01%	
Independent	O. M. Tanner	178	0.01%	
Socialist Labor	R. H. Shadwell	134	0.01%	
Majority		118,751		
Turnout				
Democratic hold		Swing		
