= 1974 United States Senate election in Missouri =

- November 5, 1974
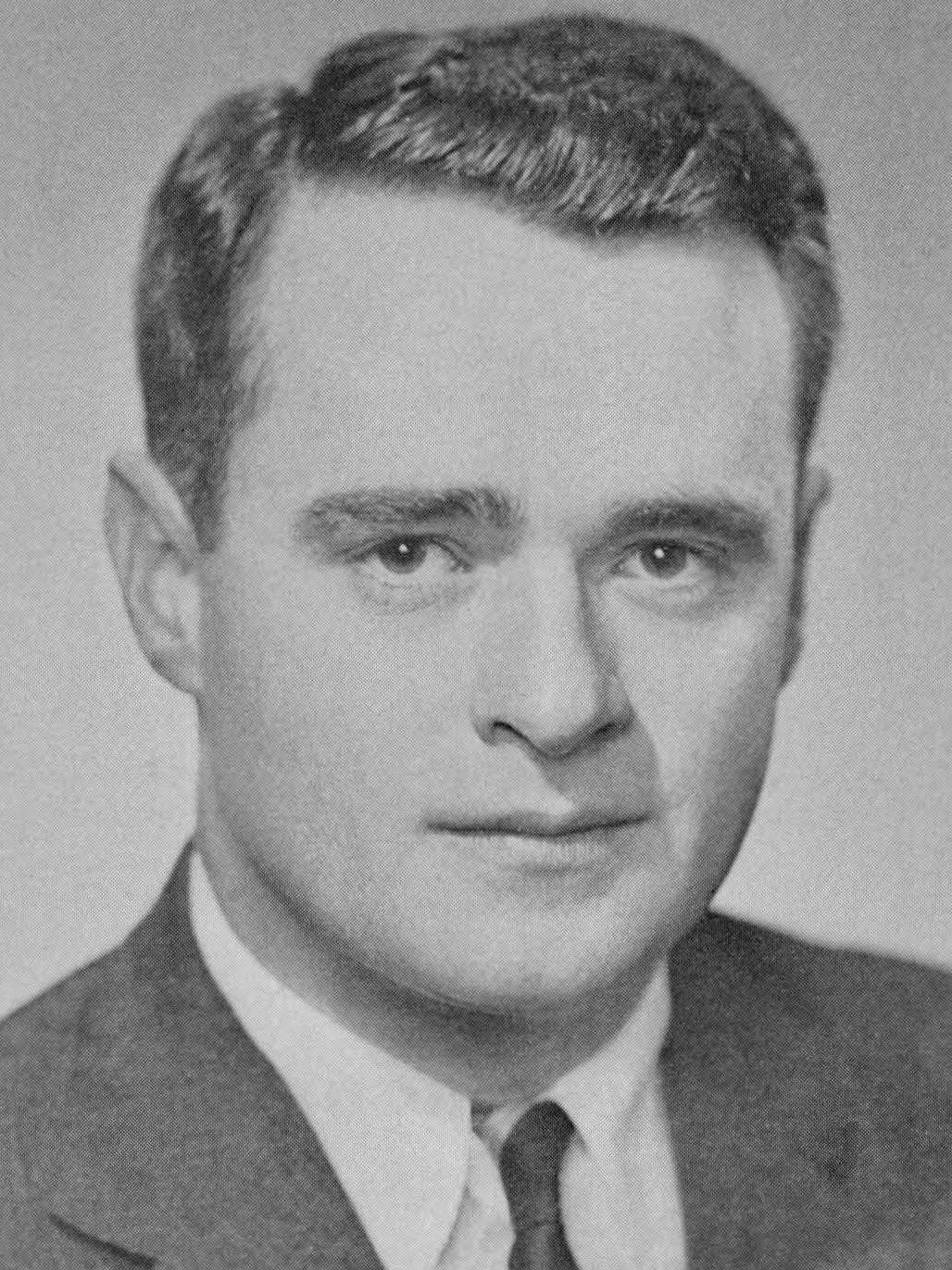

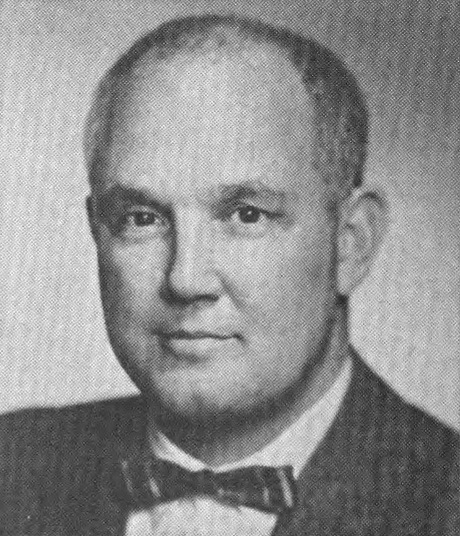
Nominee	Thomas Eagleton	Thomas B. Curtis
Party	Democratic	Republican
Popular vote	735,433	480,900
Percentage	60.07%	39.28%
- County results Eagleton: 40–50% 50–60% 60–70% 70–80% Curtis: 40–50% 50–60% 60–70%
U.S. senator before election
Thomas Eagleton
Democratic
Elected U.S. Senator
Thomas Eagleton
Democratic

The 1974 United States Senate election in Missouri was held on November 5, 1974. Incumbent Democrat Thomas Eagleton defeated Republican nominee Thomas B. Curtis, a former U.S. representative, with 60.07% of the vote. This was a rematch of the 1968 election, when Eagleton defeated Curtis by a narrow margin.

== Primary elections ==
Primary elections were held on August 6, 1974.

=== Democratic primary ===
==== Candidates ====
- Thomas Eagleton, incumbent United States senator
- Pat O'Brien
- Lee C. Sutton, former state representatives

==== Results ====
Democratic primary results
Party	Candidate	Votes	%
Democratic	Thomas Eagleton (incumbent)	420,681	87.48
Democratic	Pat O'Brien	30,389	6.32
Democratic	Lee C. Sutton	29,835	6.20
Total votes		480,905	100.00

=== Republican primary ===
==== Candidates ====
- Thomas B. Curtis, former U.S. representative
- Gregory Hansman
- Paul M. Robinett

==== Results ====
Republican primary results
Party	Candidate	Votes	%
Republican	Thomas B. Curtis	136,447	81.89
Republican	Paul M. Robinett	16,882	10.13
Republican	Gregory Hansman	13,285	7.97
Total votes		166,614	100.00

== General election ==
=== Candidates ===
Major party candidates

- Thomas B. Curtis, Republican
- Thomas Eagleton, Democratic

Other candidates

- C.E. Talmage, Independent

=== Results ===
1974 United States Senate election in Missouri
Party	Candidate	Votes	%	±%
Democratic	Thomas Eagleton (incumbent)	735,433	60.07%	
Republican	Thomas B. Curtis	480,900	39.28%	
Independent	C.E. Talmage	7,970	0.65%	
Majority		254,533		
Turnout		1,224,303		
Democratic hold		Swing		
