= 1960 United States Senate special election in Missouri =

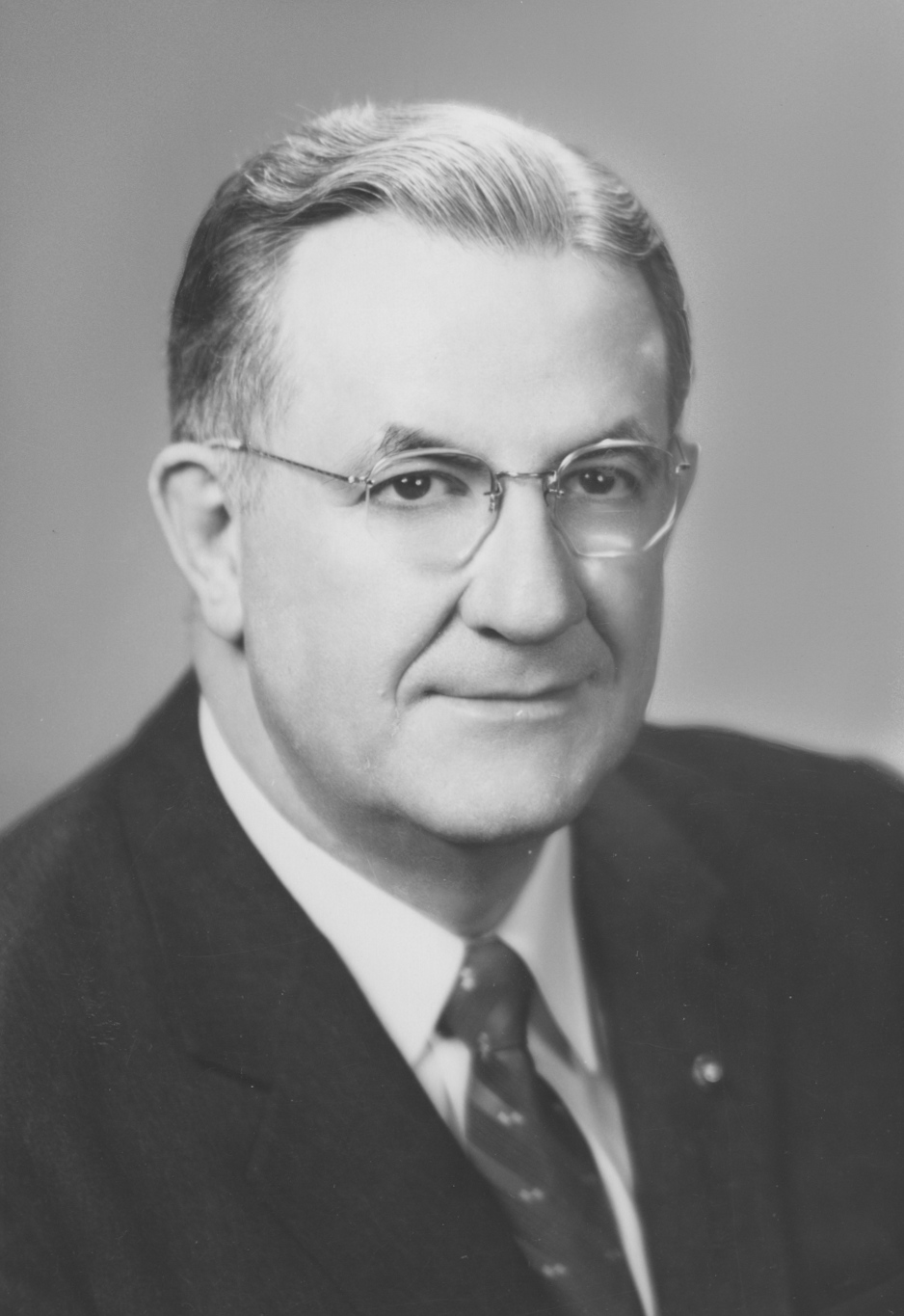

Nominee	Edward V. Long	Lon Hocker
Party	Democratic	Republican
Popular vote	999,656	880,576
Percentage	53.17%	46.83%
- County results Long: 50–60% 60–70% 70–80% Hocker: 50–60% 60–70% 70–80%
U.S. senator before election
Edward V. Long
Democratic
Elected U.S. senator
Edward V. Long
Democratic

The 1960 United States Senate special election in Missouri took place on November 8, 1960, in Missouri. The incumbent Democratic Senator, Thomas C. Hennings Jr., had died on September 13, 1960. Edward V. Long, the incumbent Lieutenant Governor of Missouri, was appointed to the seat on September 23, 1960, and won the special election. He defeated Republican nominee Lon Hocker, winning 53.2% of the vote. Long outperformed Democratic presidential nominee John F. Kennedy, who won 50.3% in Missouri in the presidential election.

== Democratic convention ==
Following the death of Hennings, the Missouri Democratic Party held a special convention to nominate a successor and candidate for the special election. The convention was deadlocked between Charles Harrison Brown, Representative for Missouri's 7th district, and James T. Blair Jr, the Governor of Missouri. Long emerged as a compromise candidate, and was endorsed by the convention on September 21.

== Results ==
1960 United States Senate special election in Missouri
Party	Candidate	Votes	%	±%
Democratic	Edward V. Long (incumbent)	999,656	53.17	−3.24
Republican	Lon Hocker	880,576	46.83	+3.24
Majority		119,080	6.34	
Turnout		1,880,232		
Democratic hold				
