= Edward V. Long =

American politician (1908–1972)

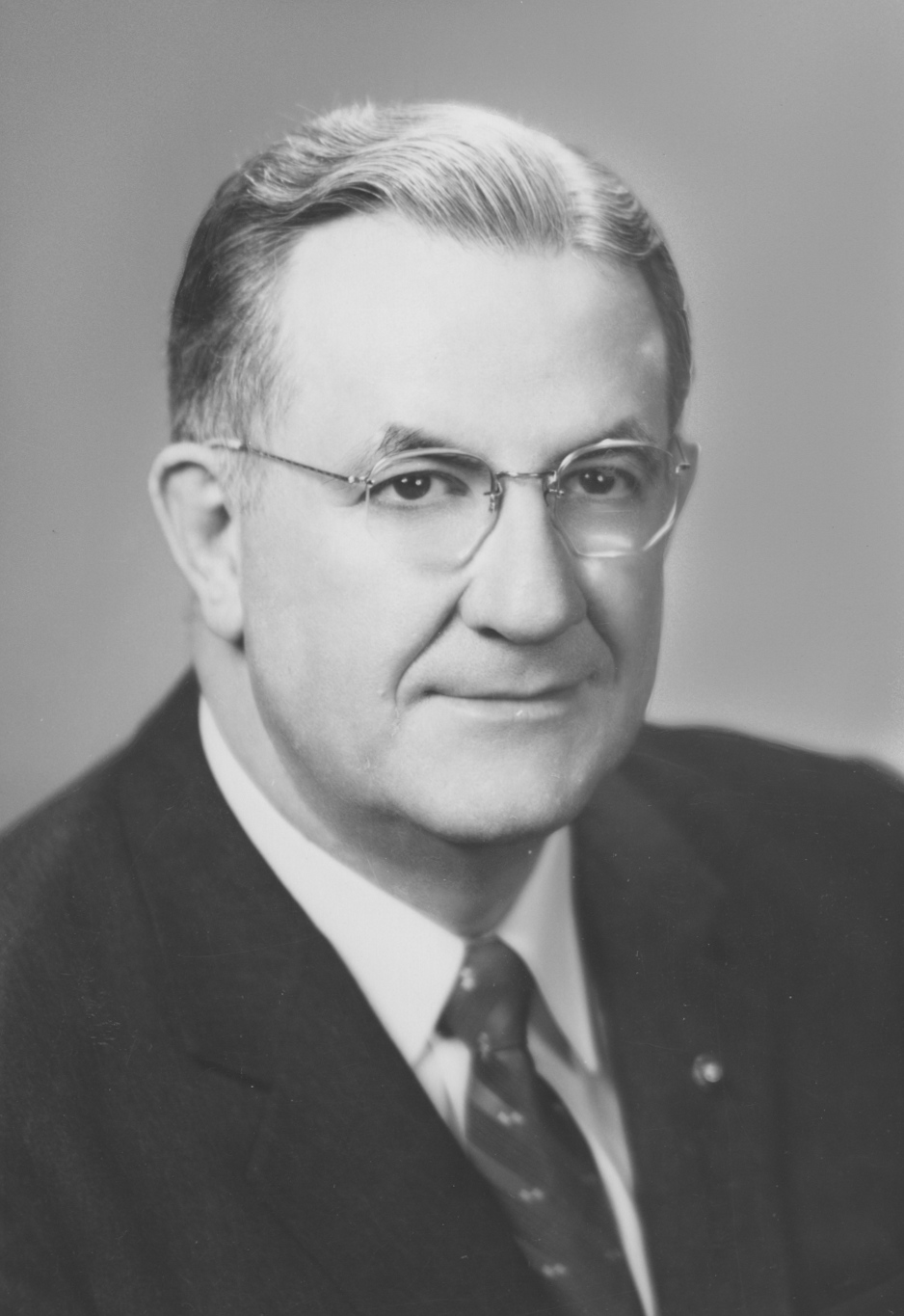

United States Senator from Missouri
- In office September 23, 1960 – December 27, 1968
- Preceded by: Thomas Hennings
- Succeeded by: Thomas Eagleton

36th Lieutenant Governor of Missouri
- In office January 14, 1957 – September 23, 1960
- Governor: James T. Blair Jr.
- Preceded by: James T. Blair Jr.
- Succeeded by: Hilary A. Bush

Member of the Missouri State Senate
- In office 1945–1955

Personal details
- Born: Edward Vaughn Long; July 18, 1908 Whiteside, Missouri, U.S.
- Died: November 6, 1972 (aged 64) Eolia, Missouri, U.S.
- Resting place: Grand View Burial Park; 39°40′06.6″N 91°24′55.4″W
- Party: Democratic
- Education: Culver-Stockton College; University of Missouri

Edward Vaughn Long (July 18, 1908 – November 6, 1972) was a United States senator from Missouri. A member of the Democratic Party, he served in the United States Senate from 1960 until 1968. One of his most notable accomplishments as a US Senator was writing the final draft of the Freedom of Information Act which passed in 1966 after 11 years of research, creation, and fight by the "Father of the Freedom of Information Act", Representative John E. Moss (D) of Sacramento, California.

== Biography ==
Born in rural Lincoln County, Missouri near Whiteside, he was educated at Culver-Stockton College and the University of Missouri.

After holding various local offices in Bowling Green and Pike County, Long was elected to the Missouri State Senate, where he served from 1945 to 1955; he was elected majority floor leader in 1952 and President pro tempore in 1955.

In his first statewide race, he was elected the Lieutenant Governor of Missouri in 1956, serving from 1957 until his appointment in 1960 by Governor James T. Blair Jr. to the Senate seat made vacant by the death of Thomas C. Hennings Jr. He won election to the Senate in his own right in 1962, but lost a primary challenge to Thomas Eagleton in 1968, and resigned his seat on December 27 of that year, resuming his law practice in Missouri. Long voted in favor of the Civil Rights Acts of 1964 and 1968, as well as the 24th Amendment to the U.S. Constitution, the Voting Rights Act of 1965, and the confirmation of Thurgood Marshall to the U.S. Supreme Court.

On November 6, 1972, Long died unexpectedly at the age of 64. Five months later, his personal secretary told prosecutors in Clarksville, Missouri, that he had told her that he believed that he had been poisoned by candy which had been sent to him in the mail, although no box of candy was found later in the home, which had been broken into two days after his death. No charges were ever filed arising from Long's death. Long's widow filed a $3.25 million lawsuit against the secretary on the same day of the report to police.

Long is buried in Grand View Burial Park, Hannibal, Missouri.

Party political offices
Preceded by James T. Blair Jr.	Democratic nominee for Lieutenant Governor of Missouri; 1956	Succeeded by Hilary A. Bush
Preceded by Thomas C. Hennings Jr.	Democratic nominee for U.S. Senator from Missouri (Class 3); 1960, 1962	Succeeded by Thomas Eagleton
Political offices
Preceded by James T. Blair, Jr.	Lieutenant Governor of Missouri; 1957–1960	Succeeded by Hilary A. Bush
U.S. Senate
Preceded by Thomas C. Hennings, Jr.	U.S. senator (Class 3) from Missouri; 1960–1968; Served alongside: Stuart Symington	Succeeded by Thomas Eagleton
