= 1960 Missouri gubernatorial election =

- November 8, 1960
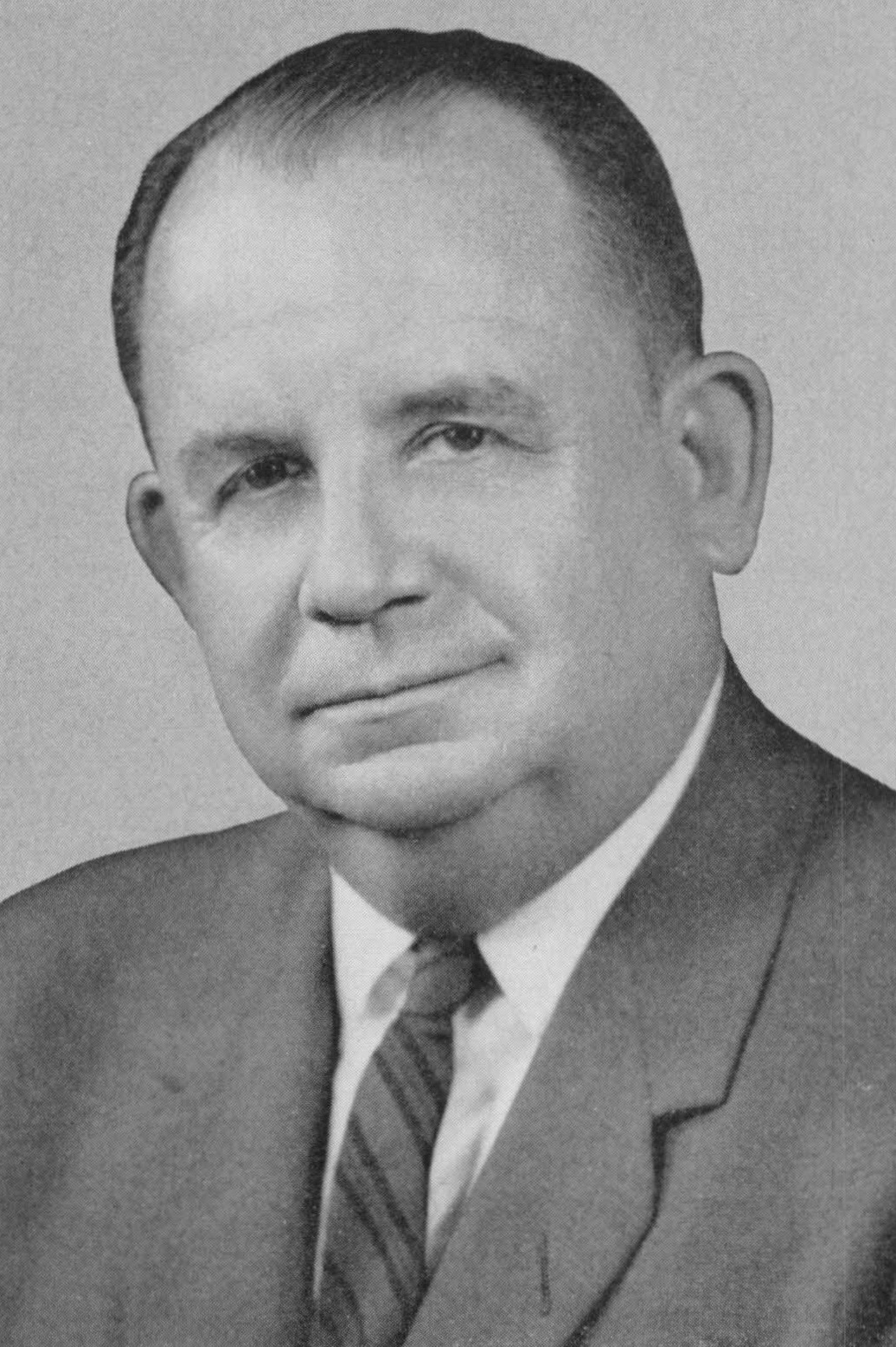

Nominee	John M. Dalton	Edward G. Farmer
Party	Democratic	Republican
Popular vote	1,095,200	792,131
Percentage	58.03%	41.97%
- County results Dalton: 50–60% 60–70% 70–80% Farmer: 50–60% 60–70% 70–80%
Governor before election
James T. Blair, Jr.
Democratic
Elected Governor
John M. Dalton
Democratic

The 1960 Missouri gubernatorial election was held on November 8, 1960, and resulted in a victory for the Democratic nominee, Missouri Attorney General John M. Dalton, over the Republican candidate, Edward G. Farmer.

== Results ==
1960 gubernatorial election, Missouri
Party	Candidate	Votes	%	±%
Democratic	John M. Dalton	1,095,200	58.03	+5.96
Republican	Edward G. Farmer	792,131	41.97	−5.96
Majority		303,069	16.06	+11.93
Turnout		1,887,331	43.69	−2.04
Democratic hold		Swing		
