= W. True Davis Jr. =

American businessman and diplomat

William True Davis (December 23, 1919 – February 26, 2003) was president and chairman of the National Bank of Washington and Ambassador to Switzerland. Under President Lyndon B. Johnson, Davis was assistant secretary of the treasury and then executive director of the Inter-American Development Bank. He died on February 26, 2003, of congestive heart failure in St. Joseph, Missouri.

== Early life ==
Davis was born December 23, 1919, in St. Joseph and graduated from Cornell University. Davis was a civilian flying instructor with the Army Air Corps during World War II and was a test pilot at the Naval Air Station at Pearl Harbor and a senior lieutenant who was honorably discharged in 1945.

== Career ==
In the 1950s, Davis took over his family business, Anchor Serum Co. Under his leadership, the company grew "into one of the largest pharmaceutical companies for veterinary medicine in the country". The company merged into Phillips Lamps Co., in 1959. A Dutch-owned worldwide electronics corporation, Davis was named president of its U.S. subsidiaries and vice president of electronics.

President John F. Kennedy appointed Davis ambassador to Switzerland in 1963. In an interview with The Washington Post in 1972, Davis said "Kennedy felt that economic intelligence flowed more freely between companies than between countries, and he wanted me for my international connections."

He served as Ambassador until 1965, when Johnson named him assistant secretary of the treasury. In 1966, he was named U.S. executive director of the Inter-American Development Bank. He resigned in 1968 so he could run for the Democratic senatorial nomination from Missouri. He lost to Thomas Eagleton, who went on to win the Senate seat. During Eagleton's run to become vice president in 1972, Davis told friends he knew of documents relating to Eagleton being charged with drunken and reckless driving. Jack Anderson went on to report this in The Washington Post.

Davis joined the National Bank of Washington in 1970 but was "eased out by officers of the United Mine Workers union, which was the bank's principal stockholder" in 1973.
