= 1948 Missouri lieutenant gubernatorial election =

- November 2, 1948
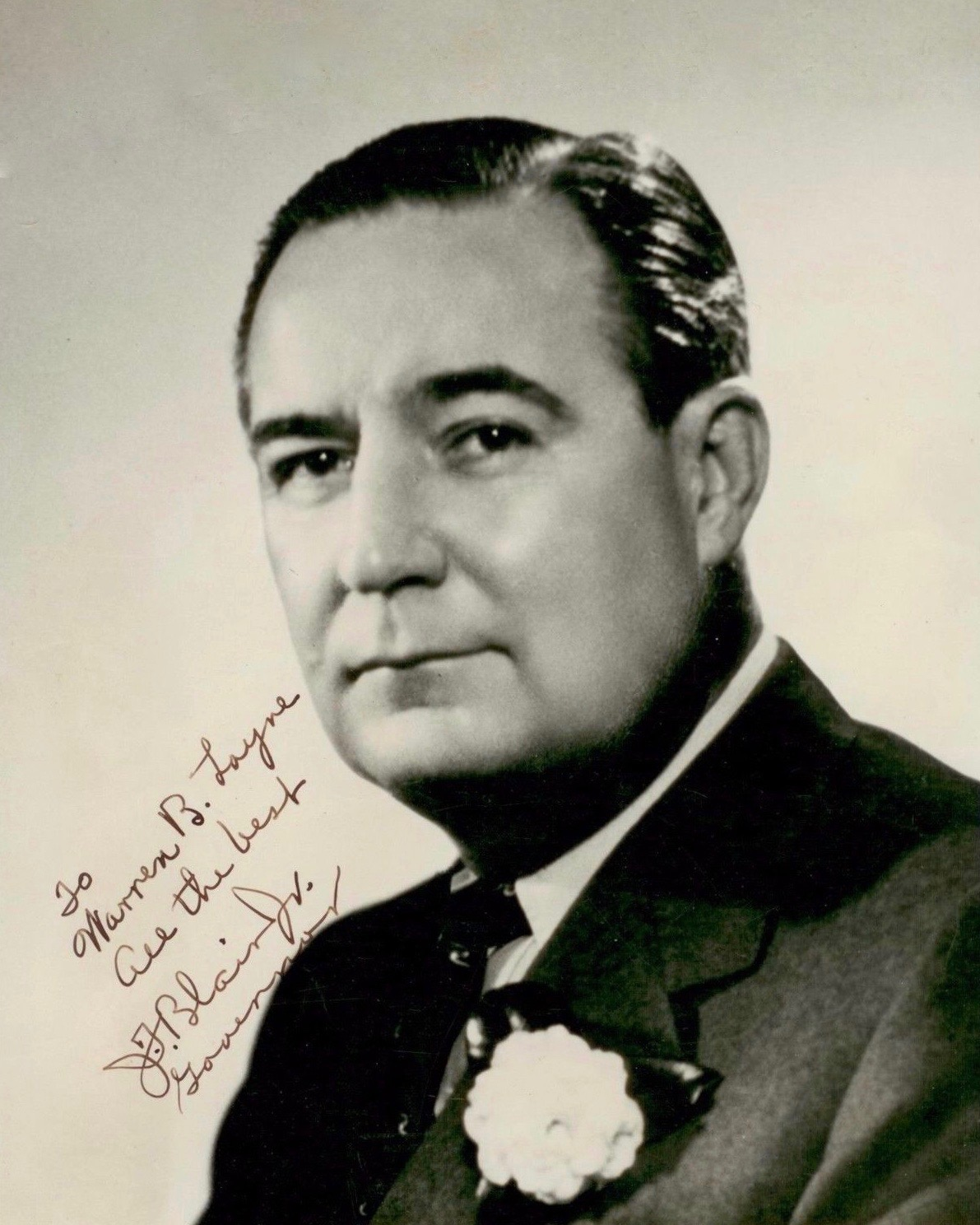

Nominee	James T. Blair Jr.	George H. Miller
Party	Democratic	Republican
Popular vote	900,673	652,776
Percentage	57.83%	41.91%
Lieutenant Governor before election
Walter Naylor Davis
Democratic
Elected Lieutenant Governor
James T. Blair Jr.
Democratic

The 1948 Missouri lieutenant gubernatorial election was held on November 2, 1948. Democratic nominee James T. Blair Jr. defeated Republican nominee George H. Miller with 57.83% of the vote.

== Primary elections ==
Primary elections were held on August 3, 1948.

=== Republican primary ===
==== Candidates ====
- George H. Miller, State Senator
- Kirk Jones
- William R. Orthwein
- Charles L. Madison, State Senator
- Adrian L. Bushman

==== Results ====
Republican primary results
Party	Candidate	Votes	%
Republican	George H. Miller	95,440	32.64
Republican	Kirk Jones	62,491	21.37
Republican	William R. Orthwein	61,755	21.12
Republican	Charles L. Madison	52,248	17.87
Republican	Adrian L. Bushman	20,477	7.00
Total votes		292,411	100.00

== General election ==
=== Candidates ===
Major party candidates

- James T. Blair Jr., Democratic
- George H. Miller, Republican

Other candidates

- Julius B. Jones, Progressive
- Vernon M. Schroeder, Socialist

=== Results ===
1948 Missouri lieutenant gubernatorial election
Party	Candidate	Votes	%	±%
Democratic	James T. Blair Jr.	900,673	57.83%	
Republican	George H. Miller	652,776	41.91%	
Progressive	Julius B. Jones	2,863	0.18%	
Socialist	Vernon M. Schroeder	1,118	0.07%	
Majority		247,897		
Turnout				
Democratic hold		Swing		
