= Thomas Eagleton =

American politician (1929–2007)

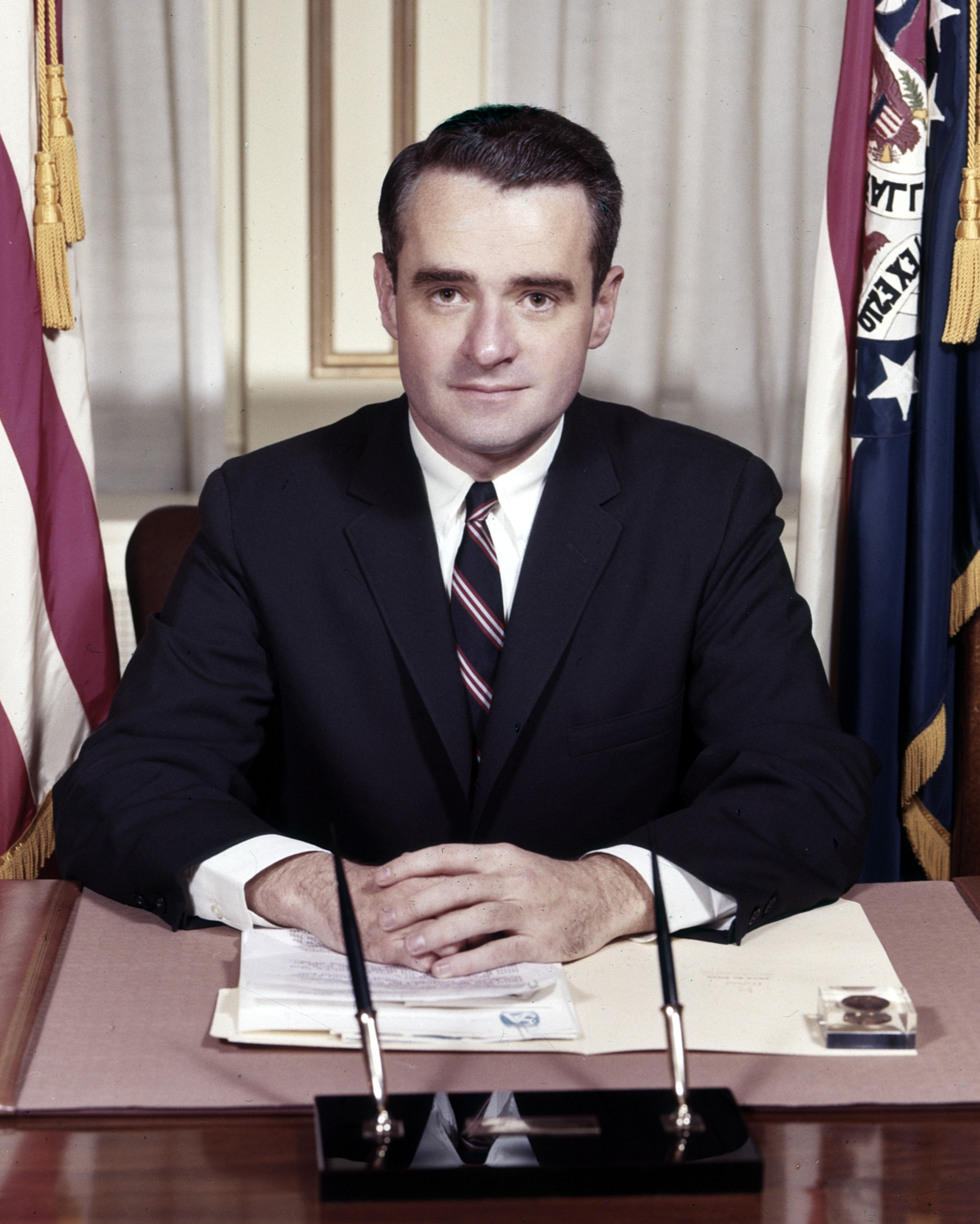
- Official portrait, 1967

United States Senator from Missouri
- In office December 28, 1968 – January 3, 1987
- Preceded by: Edward V. Long
- Succeeded by: Kit Bond

38th Lieutenant Governor of Missouri
- In office January 11, 1965 – December 27, 1968
- Governor: Warren E. Hearnes
- Preceded by: Hilary A. Bush
- Succeeded by: William S. Morris

35th Attorney General of Missouri
- In office January 9, 1961 – January 11, 1965
- Governor: John M. Dalton
- Preceded by: John M. Dalton
- Succeeded by: Norman Anderson

Personal details
- Born: Thomas Francis Eagleton; September 4, 1929 St. Louis, Missouri, U.S.
- Died: March 4, 2007 (aged 77) St. Louis, Missouri, U.S.
- Party: Democratic
- Spouse: Barbara Smith (m. 1956)
- Children: 2
- Relatives: Dominic West (cousin)
- Education: Amherst College (BA); University of Oxford (attended); Harvard University (LLB)
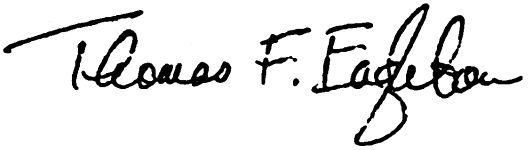
- Signature

Military service
- Allegiance: United States
- Branch/service: United States Navy
- Years of service: 1947–1949

Thomas Francis Eagleton (September 4, 1929 – March 4, 2007) was an American politician and lawyer who served as a United States senator from Missouri from 1968 to 1987. He was briefly the Democratic vice presidential nominee under George McGovern in 1972. He suffered from bouts of depression throughout his life, resulting in several hospitalizations, which were kept secret from the public. When they were revealed, the McGovern campaign was humiliated, and Eagleton was forced to quit the race. He later became an adjunct professor of public affairs at Washington University in St. Louis.

== Early life and political career ==
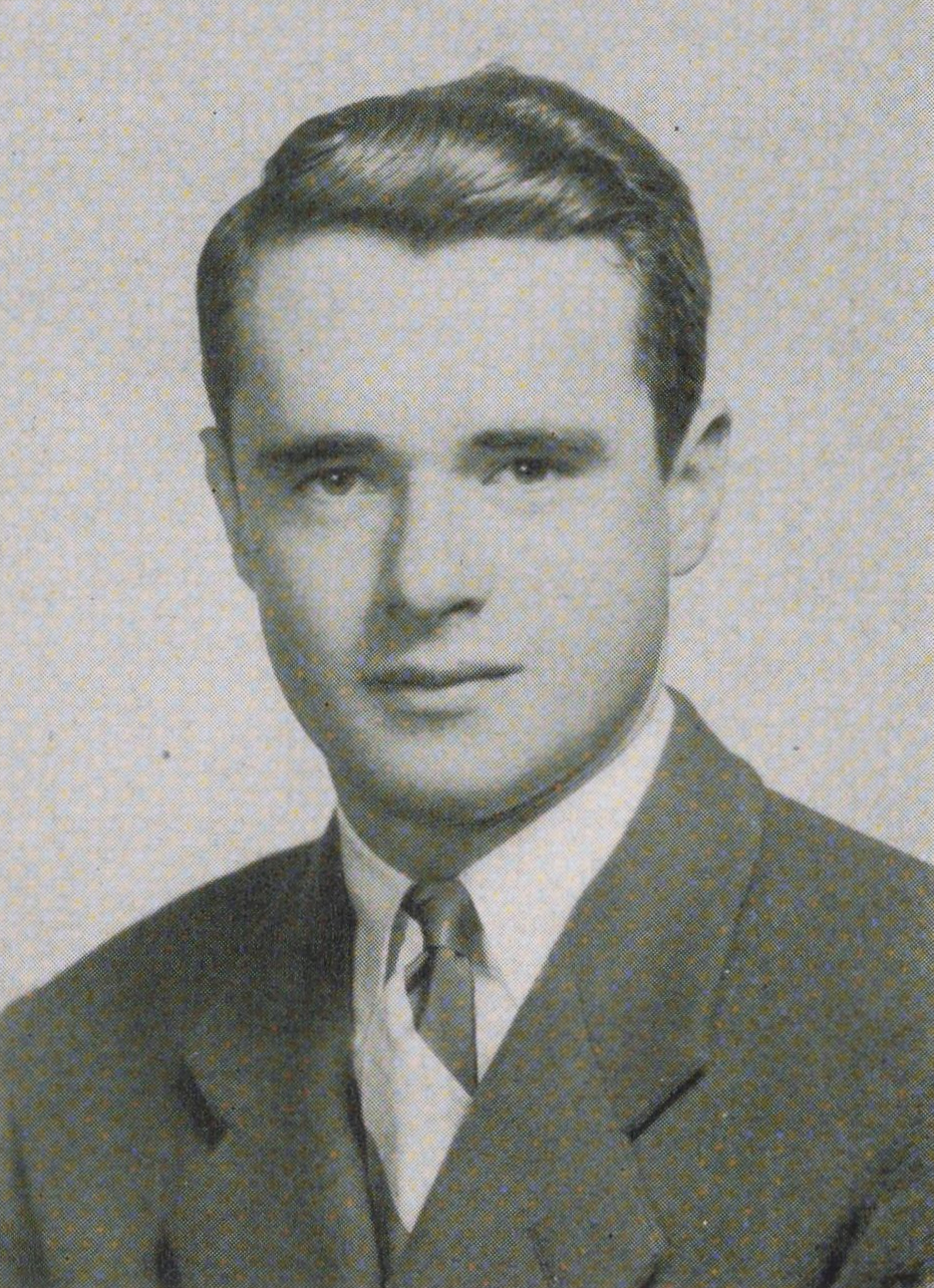
Eagleton in the Amherst College yearbook, 1950

Eagleton was born in St. Louis, Missouri, the son of Zitta Louise (Swanson) and Mark David Eagleton, a politician who had run for mayor. His paternal grandparents were Irish immigrants, and his mother had Swedish, Irish, French, and Austrian ancestry.

Eagleton graduated from St. Louis Country Day School, served in the U.S. Navy for two years, and graduated in 1950 from Amherst College, where he was a member of Delta Kappa Epsilon fraternity (Sigma chapter). He then attended Harvard Law School. After graduating in 1953, Eagleton practiced law at his father's firm and later became associated with Anheuser-Busch's legal department.

Eagleton married Barbara Ann Smith of St. Louis on January 26, 1956. A son, Terence, was born in 1959, and a daughter, Christin, in 1963. He was elected circuit attorney of the City of St. Louis in 1956. During his tenure, he appeared on the TV show What's My Line? (episode #355) as "District Attorney of St. Louis". (He stumped the panel.) He was elected Missouri Attorney General in 1960 at age 31 (the youngest in the state's history). He was elected the 38th lieutenant governor of Missouri in 1964, and won a U.S. Senate seat in 1968, unseating incumbent Edward V. Long in the Democratic primary and narrowly defeating Congressman Thomas B. Curtis in the general election.

Eagleton suffered from depression; he checked himself into hospital three times between 1960 and 1966 for physical and nervous exhaustion, receiving electroconvulsive therapy (shock therapy) twice. He later received a diagnosis of bipolar II from Frederick K. Goodwin.

The hospitalizations, which were not widely publicized, had little effect on his political aspirations. The St. Louis Post-Dispatch noted in 1972, immediately after Eagleton's vice-presidential nomination: "He had been troubled with gastric disturbances, which led to occasional hospitalizations. The stomach troubles have contributed to rumors that he had a drinking problem."

== 1972 vice-presidential candidacy ==
=== "Amnesty, abortion, and acid" ===
On April 25, 1972, as George McGovern won the Massachusetts Democratic primary, conservative journalist Robert Novak phoned Democratic politicians around the country. On April 27, 1972, Novak reported in a column his conversation with an unnamed Democratic senator about McGovern. Novak quoted the senator as saying:

The people don't know McGovern is for amnesty for draft dodgers, abortion, and legalization of pot. Once middle America—Catholic middle America, in particular—finds this out, he's dead.

Because of the column McGovern became known as the candidate of "amnesty, abortion, and acid", even though he only supported the decriminalization of marijuana and maintained that legalized abortion fell under the purview of states' rights.

On July 15, 2007, several months after Eagleton's death, Novak said on Meet the Press that the unnamed senator was Eagleton. Novak was accused in 1972 of manufacturing the quote, but said that to rebut the criticism, he took Eagleton to lunch after the campaign and asked whether he could identify him as the source; Eagleton refused. "Oh, he had to run for reelection", Novak said. "The McGovernites would kill him if they knew he had said that." Political analyst Bob Shrum says that Eagleton never would have been selected as McGovern's running mate if it had been known at the time that Eagleton was the source of the quote. "Boy, do I wish he would have let you publish his name. Then he never would have been picked as vice president," said Shrum. "Because the two things, the two things that happened to George McGovern—two of the things that happened to him—were the label you put on him, number one, and number two, the Eagleton disaster. We had a messy convention, but he could have, I think in the end, carried eight or 10 states, remained politically viable. And Eagleton was one of the great train wrecks of all time."

=== Selection as vice-presidential nominee ===
After a large number of prominent Democrats declined to be McGovern's running mate, Senator Gaylord Nelson (who was among those who declined) suggested Eagleton. McGovern chose Eagleton after only a minimal background check, as was customary for vice-presidential selections at the time. Eagleton did not mention his hospitalizations, and in fact decided with his wife to keep them secret from McGovern while he was flying to his first meeting with McGovern.

=== Replacement on the ticket ===
On July 25, 1972, just over two weeks after the 1972 Democratic Convention, Eagleton said that news reports that he had received electroshock therapy for clinical depression during the 1960s were true. McGovern initially said he would back Eagleton "1,000 percent". McGovern consulted confidentially with preeminent psychiatrists, including Eagleton's doctors, who advised him that a recurrence of Eagleton's depression was possible and could endanger the country should Eagleton become acting president. On August 1, nineteen days after being nominated, Eagleton withdrew at McGovern's request and, after a new search by McGovern, was replaced by Sargent Shriver, former U.S. Ambassador to France, and former (founding) director of the Peace Corps and the Office of Economic Opportunity.

A Time poll taken at the time found that 77% of the respondents said "Eagleton's medical record would not affect their vote." Nonetheless, the press made frequent references to his "shock therapy", and McGovern feared that this would detract from his campaign platform.

McGovern's failure to vet Eagleton and his subsequent handling of the controversy gave occasion for the Republican campaign to raise serious questions about his judgment. In the general election, the Democratic ticket won only Massachusetts and the District of Columbia.

== Later political career ==
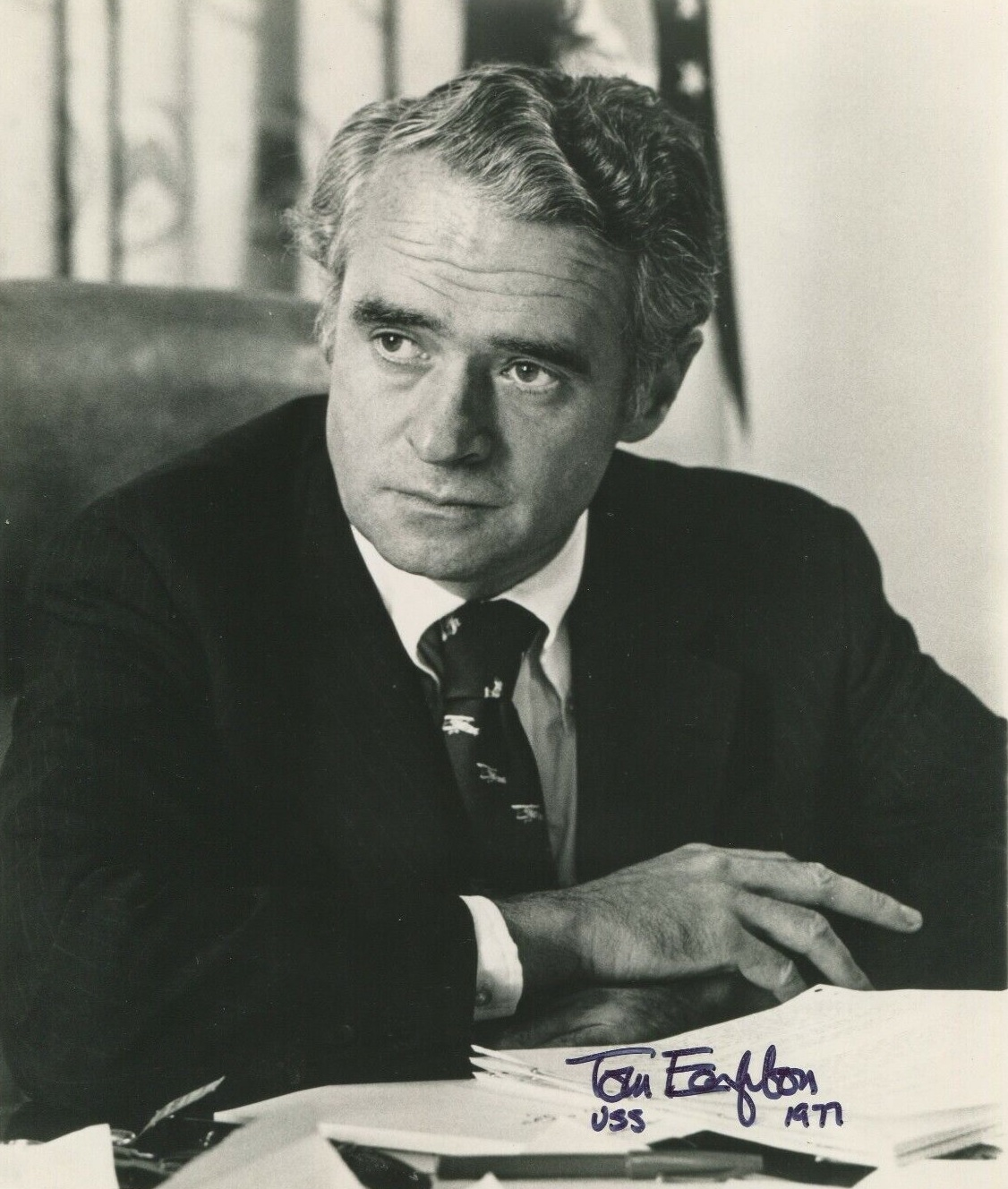
Eagleton in 1977

Eagleton was reelected to the Senate in 1974 with 60% of the vote against Thomas B. Curtis, who had been his opponent in 1968. In 1980, he was reelected by a closer-than-expected margin over St. Louis County Executive Gene McNary.

During the 1980 election, Eagleton's niece Elizabeth Eagleton Weigand and lawyer Stephen Poludniak were arrested for blackmail after they threatened to spread false accusations that Eagleton was bisexual. Eagleton told reporters that the extorted money was to be turned over to the Church of Scientology, to which Weigand and Poludniak both belonged. Weigand appealed her conviction, arguing that her trial should have been moved out of St. Louis because of extensive publicity that might have prejudiced jurors. The U.S. Supreme Court declined her appeal in 1982.

Eagleton did not seek a fourth term in 1986. Former Republican Governor Kit Bond succeeded him in the Senate.

== Senate career ==
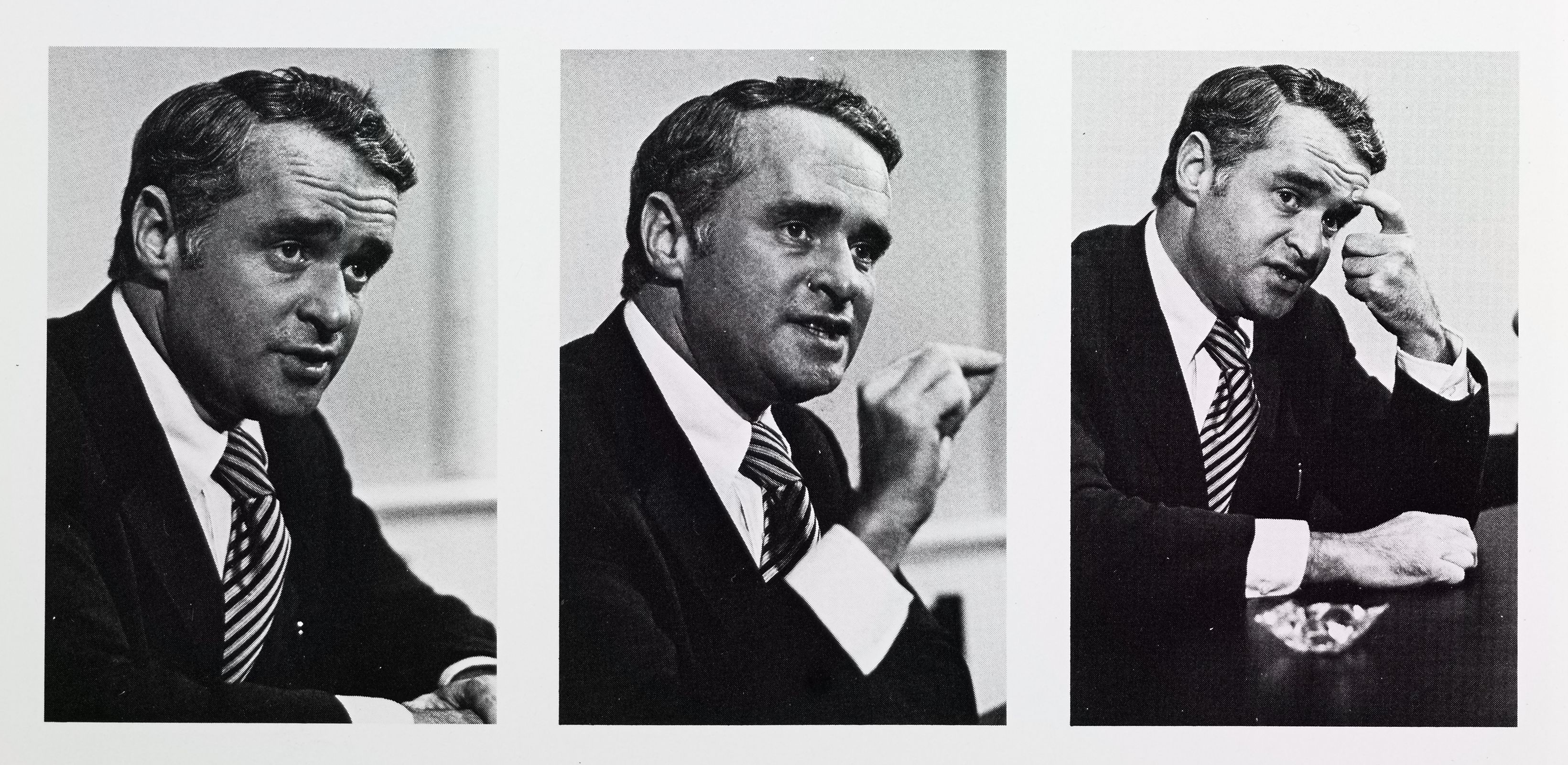
Eagleton speaks at Amherst College, January 14, 1973

In the Senate, Eagleton was active in matters dealing with foreign relations, intelligence, defense, education, health care, and the environment. He was instrumental to the Senate's passage of the Clean Air Act and the Clean Water Act, and sponsored the amendment that halted the bombing in Cambodia and effectively ended American involvement in the Vietnam War.

Notably, Eagleton was one of only three senators to oppose the nomination of Gerald Ford as vice president in 1973. The other two senators were William Hathaway of Maine and Gaylord Nelson of Wisconsin.

Eagleton was involved in the unsuccessful attempt to pass the Human Life Amendment, a series of proposals to amend the United States Constitution with the effect of overturning the Supreme Court 1973 decision Roe v. Wade, which ruled that abortion bans were unconstitutional. The version of the Human Life Amendment in which Eagleton was most involved, the Hatch-Eagleton Human Life Federalism Amendment, was the only one to receive a formal vote in the Senate.

== Post-Senate career ==
In January 1987, Eagleton returned to Missouri as an attorney, political commentator, and professor at Washington University in St. Louis, where until his death he was professor of public affairs. Throughout his Washington University career, Eagleton taught courses in economics with former chairman of the Council of Economic Advisors Murray Weidenbaum and with history professor Henry W. Berger on the Vietnam War.

On July 23, 1996, Eagleton delivered a warm introductory speech for McGovern during a promotional tour for McGovern's book Terry: My Daughter's Life-and-Death Struggle with Alcoholism at The Library, Ltd., in St. Louis. At that time, McGovern spoke favorably about Eagleton and reminisced about their short-lived presidential ticket.

During the 2000s, Eagleton served on the Council of Elders for the George and Eleanor McGovern Center for Leadership and Public Service at Dakota Wesleyan University.

In January 2001, he joined other Missouri Democrats to oppose the nomination of former governor and senator John Ashcroft for United States Attorney General. Eagleton was quoted in the official Judiciary Committee record: "John Danforth (Ashcroft's predecessor, alongside whom Eagleton served) would have been my first choice. John Ashcroft would have been my last choice."

In 2005 and 2006, he co-taught a seminar on the U.S. presidency and the Constitution with Joel Goldstein at Saint Louis University School of Law. He was also a partner in the St. Louis law firm Thompson Coburn and a chief negotiator for a coalition of local business interests that lured the Los Angeles Rams football team to St. Louis. Eagleton authored three books on politics. He strongly supported Democratic Senate nominee Claire McCaskill in 2006; McCaskill defeated incumbent Jim Talent.

Eagleton led a group, Catholics for Amendment 2, composed of prominent Catholics who challenged church leaders' opposition to embryonic stem cell research and supported a proposed state constitutional amendment that would have protected such research in Missouri. The group emailed a letter to fellow Catholics explaining reasons for supporting Amendment 2. The amendment ensures that any federally approved stem cell research and treatments would be available in Missouri. "[T]he letter from Catholics for Amendment 2 said the group felt a moral obligation to respond to what it called misinformation, scare tactics and distortions being spread by opponents of the initiative, including the church."

Eagleton died in St. Louis on March 4, 2007, of heart and respiratory complications. He donated his body to medical science at Washington University. He wrote a farewell letter to his family and friends months before he died, saying that his dying wishes were for people to "go forth in love and peace—be kind to dogs—and vote Democratic".

== Honors and awards ==
On behalf of then-President Ronald Reagan, Eagleton threw out the ceremonial first pitch to end the pregame ceremonies of Game 5 of the 1985 World Series.

The 8th Circuit federal courthouse in St. Louis is named after Eagleton. Dedicated on September 11, 2000, it is named the Thomas F. Eagleton United States Courthouse.

Eagleton has been honored with a star on the St. Louis Walk of Fame.

== Personal life ==
Eagleton was a Roman Catholic. He strongly opposed abortion despite his reputation as a liberal. His religion was one of the defining factors of his political career, as religion was an important political issue in Missouri. Eagleton's Catholicism increased his appeal to the working class of St. Louis and offset the "elitist stigma" of his private school education. At the same time, Missouri's suburbs were staunchly anti-Catholic, which proved a challenge during the 1960 election.

Eagleton believed the Catholic Church was "a vital part of American life, conscience and thought". He described himself as "a Pope John XXIII and an Archbishop John L. May Catholic", and considered these two figures his religious mentors. Because of his religion and youth, Eagleton was often compared to John F. Kennedy; in 1972, the St. Louis Post Dispatch wrote: "With his good looks, style, youth, liberal views and Catholic religion, Eagleton is the closest thing to a Kennedy Missouri has to offer". In his 2006 farewell letter, Eagleton wrote: "In the era of a Christian right, we seem to have merged God's power into political power".

Eagleton married Barbara Ann Smith Eagleton in 1956, and the couple had two children together, a son and a daughter. Eagleton was survived by his wife and their children.

Party political offices
Preceded by John M. Dalton	Democratic nominee for Attorney General of Missouri; 1960	Succeeded by Norman Anderson
Preceded by Hilary A. Bush	Democratic nominee for Lieutenant Governor of Missouri; 1964	Succeeded by William S. Morris
Preceded by Edward V. Long	Democratic nominee for U.S. Senator from Missouri (Class 3); 1968, 1974, 1980	Succeeded by Harriett Woods
Preceded by Mike Mansfield	Response to the State of the Union address 1972; Served alongside: Carl Albert, Lloyd Bentsen, Hale Boggs, John Brademas, Frank Church, Martha Griffiths, John Melcher, Ralph Metcalfe, William Proxmire, Leonor Sullivan	Vacant Title next held by Mike Mansfield
Preceded by Edmund Muskie	Democratic nominee for Vice President of the United States; Withdrew; 1972	Succeeded by Sargent Shriver
Legal offices
Preceded by John M. Dalton	Attorney General of Missouri; 1961–1965	Succeeded by Norman Anderson
Political offices
Preceded by Hilary A. Bush	Lieutenant Governor of Missouri; 1965–1968	Succeeded by William S. Morris
U.S. Senate
Preceded by Edward V. Long	U.S. Senator (Class 3) from Missouri; 1968–1987; Served alongside: Stuart Symington, John Danforth	Succeeded by Kit Bond
Preceded by Charles H. Percy	Ranking Member of the Senate Governmental Affairs Committee; 1981–1987	Succeeded by William Roth
