= Hilary A. Bush =

American politician (1905–1992)

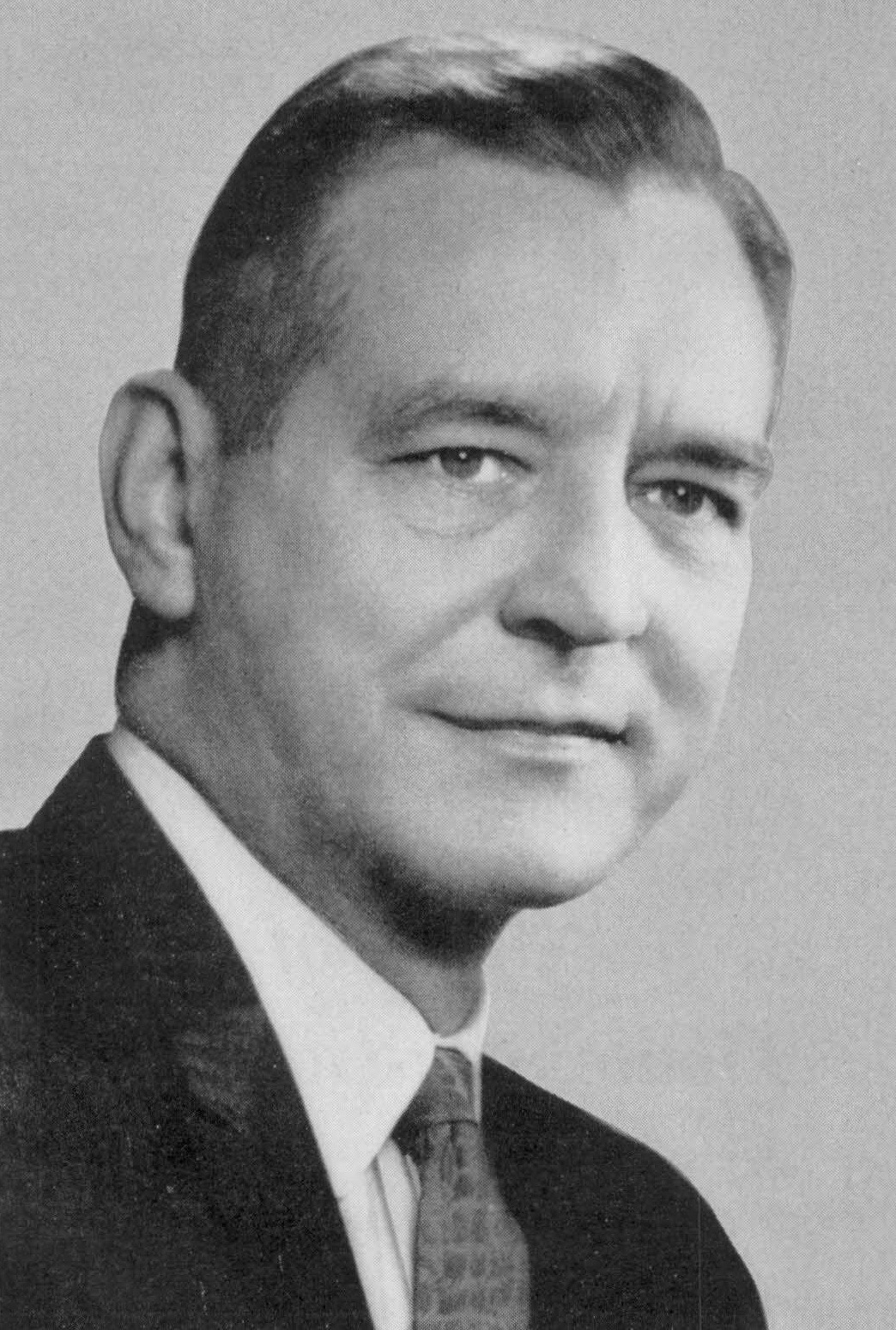

Lieutenant Governor of Missouri
- In office January 9, 1961 – January 11, 1965
- Governor: John M. Dalton
- Preceded by: Edward V. Long
- Succeeded by: Thomas Eagleton

Personal details
- Born: Hilary Ashby Bush; June 21, 1905 Excelsior Springs, Missouri, U.S.
- Died: May 20, 1992 (aged 86) Milwaukee, Wisconsin, U.S.
- Party: Democratic

Hilary Ashby Bush (June 21, 1905 – May 20, 1992) was a Democratic Party politician who was Jackson County, Missouri prosecutor in the 1940s and 1950s, and the 37th lieutenant governor from 1961 to 1965, serving under Governor John M. Dalton. Bush played an influential role in the merger of the University of Kansas City with the University of Missouri system to form the University of Missouri-Kansas City.

== Biography ==
Bush was born on June 21, 1905, in Excelsior Springs, Missouri. He graduated from William Jewell College in 1926, and from the University of Kansas City Law School in 1932. He rose to lieutenant colonel in the Army during World War II and was Military Governor of Aomori Prefecture in Japan in 1945.

In 1960, lieutenant governor incumbent Edward V. Long resigned after being appointed to the U.S. Senate left vacant by the death of Thomas C. Hennings, Jr. Bush became the "establishment" candidate for lieutenant governor, backed by remnants of the Thomas Pendergast political machine. In 1964, he was the Democratic establishment candidate for governor but was defeated in the primary by 59,386 votes by Warren Hearnes who said in his campaign, "At one time all Missouri was controlled from Kansas City by a man named Pendergast. This type of machine politics should never be allowed to rear its ugly head again in Missouri politics."

Hilary A. Bush died in Milwaukee, Wisconsin on May 20, 1992, while visiting family. He was cremated.

Party political offices
| Preceded by Edward V. Long | Democratic nominee for Lieutenant Governor of Missouri; 1960 | Succeeded by Thomas Eagleton |
Political offices
| Preceded by Edward V. Long | Lieutenant Governor of Missouri; 1961–1965 | Succeeded by Thomas Eagleton |
