= 1956 Missouri gubernatorial election =

- November 6, 1956
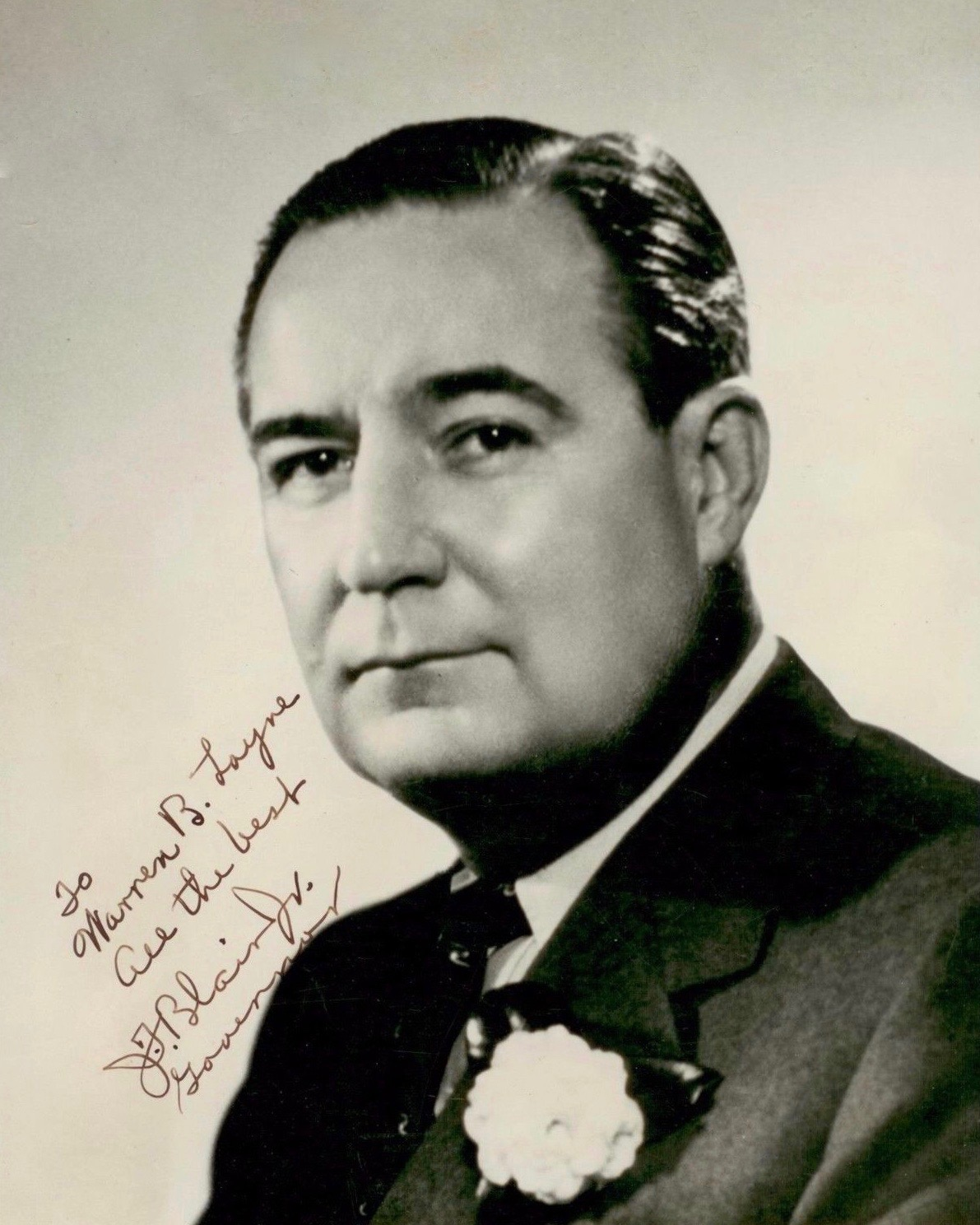

Nominee	James T. Blair Jr.	Lon Hocker
Party	Democratic	Republican
Popular vote	941,528	866,810
Percentage	52.07%	47.93%
- County results Blair: 50–60% 60–70% 70–80% Hocker: 50–60% 60–70% 70–80%
Governor before election
Phil M. Donnelly
Democratic
Elected Governor
James T. Blair Jr.
Democratic

The 1956 Missouri gubernatorial election was held on November 6, 1956, and resulted in a victory for the Democratic nominee, Lt. Governor James T. Blair, Jr., over the Republican nominee, Lon Hocker.

== Results ==
1956 gubernatorial election, Missouri
Party	Candidate	Votes	%	±%
Democratic	James T. Blair, Jr.	941,528	52.07	−0.48
Republican	Lon Hocker	866,810	47.93	+0.56
Majority		74,718	4.13	−1.04
Turnout		1,808,338	45.73	−1.58
Democratic hold		Swing		
