= Whiteside, Missouri =

- Village
- Whiteside Post Office

- Location of Whiteside, Missouri
- Coordinates: 39°11′02″N 91°01′00″W
- Country: United States
- State: Missouri
- County: Lincoln
- Incorporated: 1907

Area
  - Total: 0.10 sq mi (0.27 km^{2})
  - Land: 0.10 sq mi (0.27 km^{2})
  - Water: 0 sq mi (0.00 km^{2})
- Elevation: 801 ft (244 m)

Population (2020)
  - Total: 52
  - Density: 501.5/sq mi (193.63/km^{2})
- Time zone: UTC-6 (Central (CST))
  - Summer (DST): UTC-5 (CDT)
- ZIP code: 63387
- Area code: 573
- FIPS code: 29-79558
- GNIS feature ID: 2400166

Whiteside is a village in Union Township in Lincoln County, Missouri, United States. The population was 52 at the 2020 census.

== History ==
Whiteside was platted in 1882, and named after William Whiteside, the original owner of the town site. A post office called Whiteside has been in operation since 1883.

== Geography ==
According to the United States Census Bureau, the village has a total area of 0.09 square miles (0.23 km^{2}), all land.

== Demographics ==
Historical population
Census	Pop.	Note	%±
1910	129		—
1920	166		28.7%
1930	119		−28.3%
1940	122		2.5%
1950	93		−23.8%
1960	122		31.2%
1970	125		2.5%
1980	97		−22.4%
1990	79		−18.6%
2000	67		−15.2%
2010	75		11.9%
2020	52		−30.7%
U.S. Decennial Census

=== 2010 census ===
As of the census of 2010, there were 75 people, 29 households, and 20 families living in the village. The population density was 833.3 inhabitants per square mile (321.7/km^{2}). There were 32 housing units at an average density of 355.6 per square mile (137.3/km^{2}). The racial makeup of the village was 96.0% White, 1.3% from other races, and 2.7% from two or more races. Hispanic or Latino of any race were 2.7% of the population.

There were 29 households, of which 31.0% had children under the age of 18 living with them, 41.4% were married couples living together, 17.2% had a female householder with no husband present, 10.3% had a male householder with no wife present, and 31.0% were non-families. 20.7% of all households were made up of individuals, and 6.9% had someone living alone who was 65 years of age or older. The average household size was 2.59 and the average family size was 2.80.

The median age in the village was 42.5 years. 18.7% of residents were under the age of 18; 13.3% were between the ages of 18 and 24; 19.9% were from 25 to 44; 36% were from 45 to 64; and 12% were 65 years of age or older. The gender makeup of the village was 56.0% male and 44.0% female.

=== 2000 census ===
As of the census of 2000, there were 67 people, 26 households, and 19 families living in the village. The population density was 737.7 inhabitants per square mile (284.8/km^{2}). There were 31 housing units at an average density of 341.3 per square mile (131.8/km^{2}). The racial makeup of the village was 100.00% White.

There were 26 households, out of which 30.8% had children under the age of 18 living with them, 57.7% were married couples living together, 11.5% had a female householder with no husband present, and 26.9% were non-families. 23.1% of all households were made up of individuals, and 15.4% had someone living alone who was 65 years of age or older. The average household size was 2.58 and the average family size was 2.84.

In the village, the population was spread out, with 32.8% under the age of 18, 3.0% from 18 to 24, 31.3% from 25 to 44, 17.9% from 45 to 64, and 14.9% who were 65 years of age or older. The median age was 37 years. For every 100 females, there were 123.3 males. For every 100 females age 18 and over, there were 95.7 males.

The median income for a household in the village was $41,250, and the median income for a family was $48,125. Males had a median income of $31,250 versus $26,250 for females. The per capita income for the village was $16,297. There were 11.1% of families and 12.5% of the population living below the poverty line, including 16.7% of under eighteens and none of those over 64.

== Education ==
It is in the Pike County R-III School District.
