= Richard M. Webster =

American politician

Member of the Missouri Senate from the 32nd district
- In office January 9, 1963 – March 4, 1990
- Preceded by: Arkley Frieze
- Succeeded by: Marvin Singleton

Speaker of the Missouri House of Representatives
- In office 1954–1955
- Preceded by: L.A. Vonderschmidt
- Succeeded by: Roy Hamlin

Personal details
- Born: April 29, 1922 Carthage, Missouri, U.S.
- Died: March 4, 1990 (aged 67)
- Party: Republican
- Spouse: Janet Poston Whitehead
- Children: William L. Webster
- Education: University of Missouri

Richard M. Webster (April 29, 1922 – March 4, 1990) was an American politician from Missouri. He attended the University of Missouri and worked as an attorney in Carthage, Missouri. He was elected to the Missouri House of Representatives, in 1948, 1950, and 1953 (special election). He served as Speaker of the House in 1954. He was elected to the Missouri State Senate in 1962 and was re-elected 6 times. He served in the Missouri Senate until his death in 1990.

Webster represented Ken McElroy, along with defense attorney Richard Gene McFadin, in McElroy's 1981 trial for shooting a grocer.

Webster was married to the former Janet Poston Whitehead for 42 years. Their son, William L. Webster served as Missouri Attorney General. Their oldest son, Richard M. Webster, Jr. continues to live in Carthage, Missouri and served as the Jasper County Auditor.

Party political offices
Preceded by Herbert Douglas	Republican nominee for Missouri Attorney General; 1952	Succeeded by Vincent E. Baker
Preceded by Henry Arthur	Republican nominee for Lieutenant Governor of Missouri; 1956	Succeeded by Harry E. Hatcher
Preceded by L.A. Vonderschmidt	Speaker of the Missouri House of Representatives; 1954–1955	Succeeded by Roy Hamlin
