= John M. Dalton =

American politician (1900–1972)

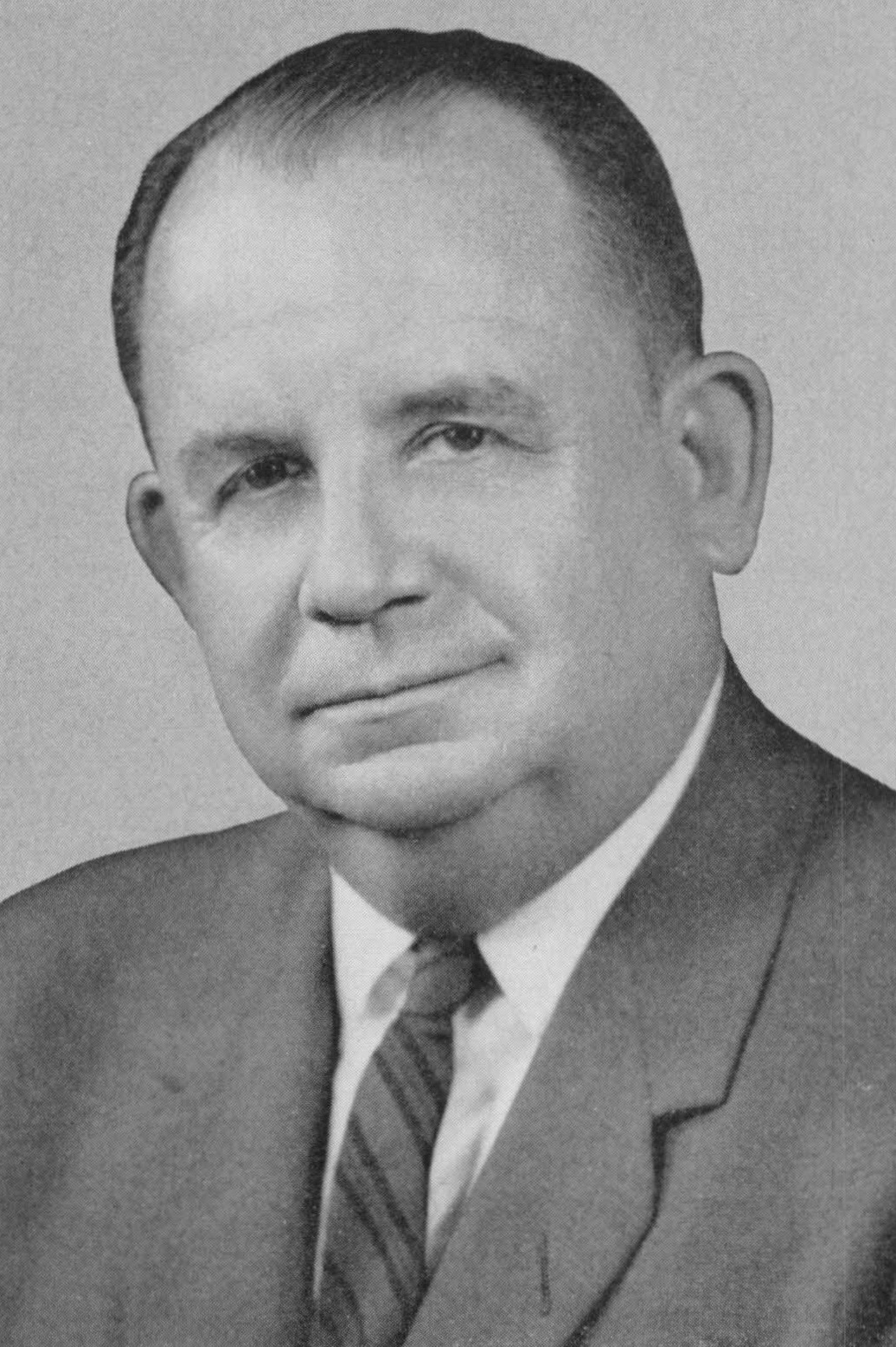

45th Governor of Missouri
- In office January 9, 1961 – January 11, 1965
- Lieutenant: Hilary A. Bush
- Preceded by: James T. Blair Jr.
- Succeeded by: Warren E. Hearnes

34th Attorney General of Missouri
- In office 1953–1961
- Governor: Phil M. Donnelly (1953–1957); James T. Blair, Jr. (1957–1961)
- Preceded by: Jonathan E. "Buck" Taylor
- Succeeded by: Thomas Eagleton

Personal details
- Born: November 9, 1900 Vernon County, Missouri, U.S.
- Died: July 7, 1972 (aged 71) Jefferson City, Missouri, U.S.
- Resting place: Oak Ridge Cemetery; Kennett, Missouri
- Party: Democratic
- Spouse: Geraldine Hall
- Profession: Lawyer

John Montgomery Dalton (November 9, 1900 – July 7, 1972) was an American attorney and Democratic politician from the state of Missouri. He was the 45th governor of Missouri and the state's 34th attorney general of Missouri.

== Personal history ==
Dalton was born in rural Vernon County, Missouri, in 1900 to Frederick Alfred Dalton and Ida Jane Dunlap (née Poage) Dalton. He had three brothers and two sisters. One brother, Sidna P. Dalton, would serve as Chief Justice of the Missouri Supreme Court. He received his secondary education at Columbia High School in Columbia, Missouri, and then attended the University of Missouri where he earned a law degree in 1923.

After passing the Missouri Bar, he returned to southern Missouri, establishing a law practice in Kennett, where he also served as city attorney from 1944 to 1953. John Dalton and his wife Geraldine were the parents of two children. Dalton died July 7, 1972, in Jefferson City, Missouri, and is buried in Oak Ridge Cemetery in Kennett.

== Political history ==
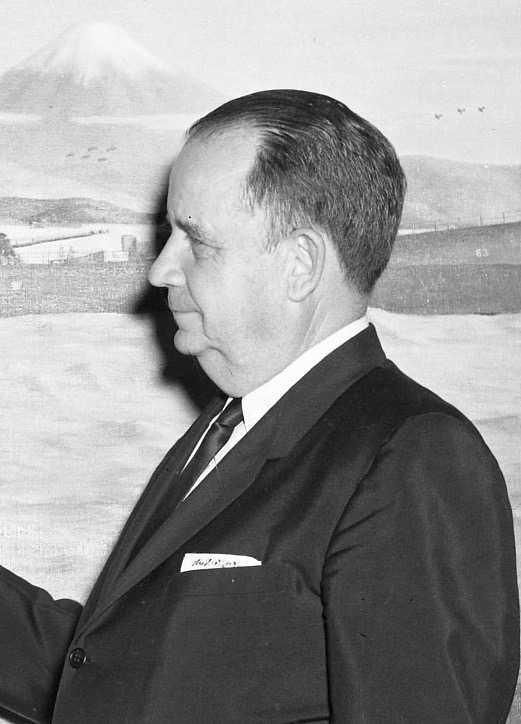
Dalton in 1963

John Dalton first entered statewide politics in 1952, running for and winning the first of two consecutive terms as Missouri Attorney General. In November 1960, Dalton won election to be Missouri's 45th Governor, his term running from January 9, 1961, to January 11, 1965.

Governor Dalton signed legislation requiring all passenger vehicles in Missouri to have seat belts and established a drivers license points system for traffic violations. Other actions included securing funding for a new headquarters for the Missouri Highway Patrol, creation of the Ozark National Scenic Riverways, and furthering desegregation of Missouri schools.

== Honors ==
- The Dalton Cardiovascular Research Center at the University of Missouri is named for Dalton.
- A portion of U.S. Highway 412 in Dunklin County and Pemiscot County bears the name "Governor John M. Dalton Memorial Highway."
- Gov. Dalton was a Master mason, serving as Grand Orator for the Grand Lodge of Missouri.

Party political offices
Preceded by Jonathan E. Taylor	Democratic nominee for Missouri Attorney General; 1952, 1956	Succeeded by Thomas Eagleton
Preceded by James T. Blair Jr.	Democratic nominee for Governor of Missouri; 1960	Succeeded by Warren E. Hearnes
Legal offices
Preceded by Jonathan E. Taylor	Missouri State Attorney General; January 12, 1953–January 9, 1961	Succeeded by Thomas Eagleton
Political offices
Preceded by James T. Blair, Jr.	Governor of Missouri; January 9, 1961–January 11, 1965	Succeeded by Warren E. Hearnes
