= James T. Blair Jr. =

American politician (1902–1962)

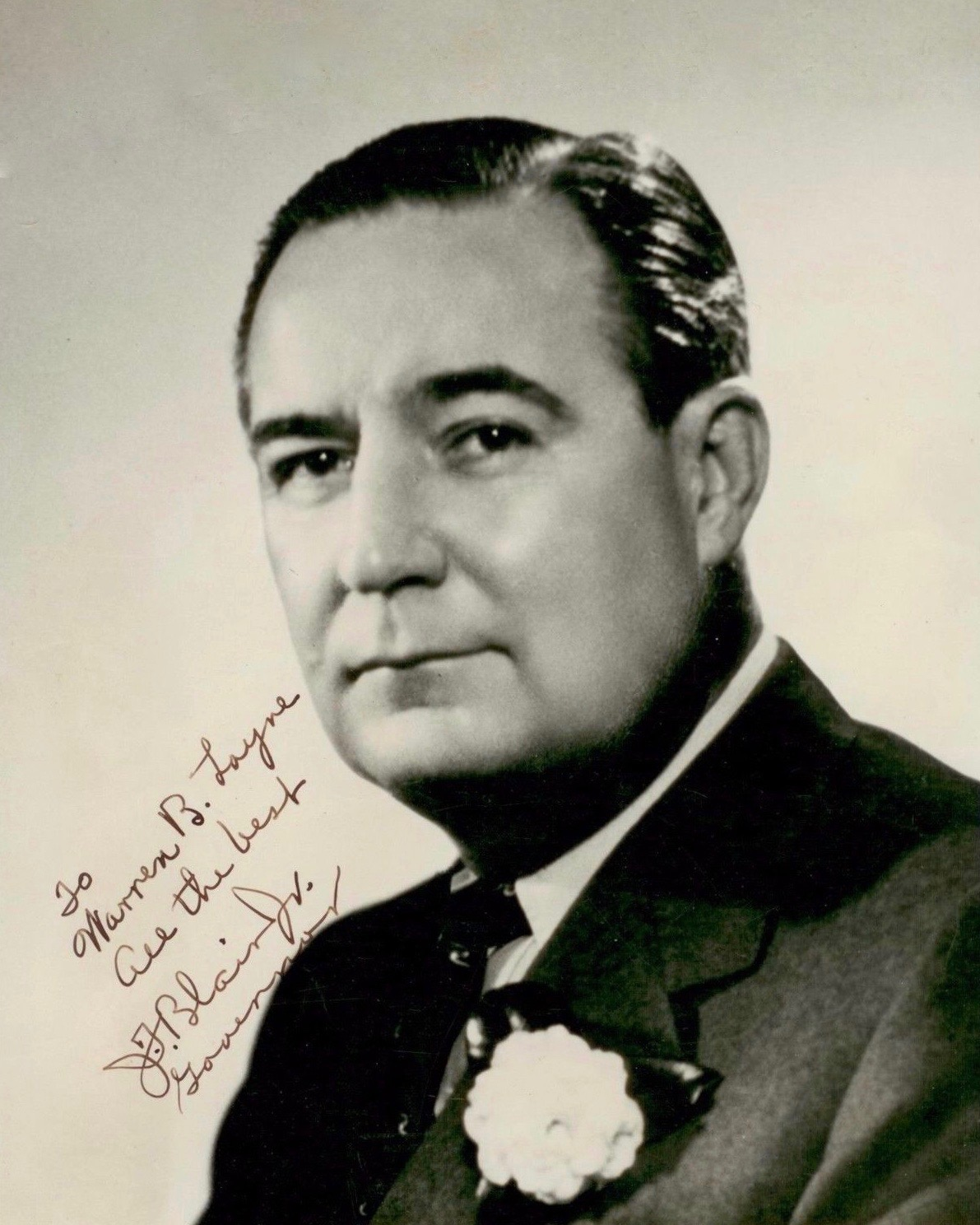

44th Governor of Missouri
- In office January 14, 1957 – January 9, 1961
- Lieutenant: Edward V. Long
- Preceded by: Phil M. Donnelly
- Succeeded by: John M. Dalton

35th Lieutenant Governor of Missouri
- In office January 10, 1949 – January 14, 1957
- Governor: Forrest Smith; Phil M. Donnelly
- Preceded by: Walter N. Davis
- Succeeded by: Edward V. Long

Member of the Missouri House of Representatives
- In office 1929–1937

Personal details
- Born: James Thomas Blair Jr. March 15, 1902 Maysville, Missouri, U.S.
- Died: July 12, 1962 (aged 60) Jefferson City, Missouri, U.S.
- Resting place: Riverview Cemetery, Jefferson City, Missouri
- Party: Democratic
- Spouse: Emilie Chorn
- Children: 2
- Profession: Politician; Lawyer
- Awards: Air Medal; Legion of Merit; Bronze Star

Military service
- Allegiance: United States
- Branch/service: United States Army
- Rank: Lieutenant Colonel
- Battles/wars: World War II

James Thomas Blair Jr. (March 15, 1902 – July 12, 1962) was an American Democratic politician from the state of Missouri. He served as the 44th governor of Missouri from 1957 to 1961, as well as the 35th lieutenant governor of Missouri from 1949 to 1957, and a member of the Missouri House of Representatives.

== Personal history ==
Blair was born in Maysville, Missouri to James T. Blair and Grace (Ray) Blair. His father was a prominent lawyer in Springfield, Missouri who would later serve as an assistant attorney general for the state of Missouri and, in 1914, be appointed a judge to the Missouri Supreme Court. Blair Jr. attended the Jefferson City, Missouri public schools and Staunton Military Academy in Virginia before pursuing higher education at Southwest Missouri State Teachers College (now Missouri State University) and the University of Missouri. He earned his law degree in 1924 from Cumberland University in Tennessee. Blair married his wife Emilie Chorn of Kansas City in July 1926.

They were the parents of two children: a son, James T. Blair III, and daughter Mary Margaret. During World War II Blair served in the US Army Air Forces in the European Theater. He received the Air Medal, Legion of Merit, and Bronze Star among other awards as he rose to the rank of lieutenant colonel.

== Political history ==
Blair first entered politics shortly after graduation from law school by running for and winning election as city attorney for Jefferson City in 1925. In 1928, Blair won election to the first of two consecutive terms in Missouri House of Representatives. Following his second term in the General Assembly, Blair left politics to focus on his private law practice until his service in World War II. Blair returned to politics in 1947 with his election as mayor of Jefferson City. His mayoral term was short-lived, however, as in 1948 he was elected Missouri's Lieutenant Governor, a post he held until he assumed the office of governor, winning that race in November 1956.

As governor, Blair was known as a civil rights advocate, declaring to the General Assembly "Always and everywhere I will identify myself with any victim of oppression or discrimination...and I will support him". This helped lead to the Missouri Commission on Human Rights in 1957. While in office, Blair was also an advocate of welfare reform and extending health insurance to the disabled. Under his governorship the first budget control and review office was established. Other highlights include a nursing home licensing law, establishing a Council on Higher Education, expansion of the Missouri Highway Patrol and setting of road speed limits, and setting up a state employee pension fund. At the time Missouri law prohibited a second consecutive term as governor, leading to Blair's retirement from politics after leaving office in January 1961.

== Death ==
James T. Blair's retirement would be short-lived. On July 12, 1962, Blair and his wife were found dead in their suburban Jefferson City home due to carbon monoxide poisoning. Investigators theorized the home's central air conditioning system sucked in exhaust fumes from a vehicle accidentally left running in the garage. Governor Blair and his wife were buried in the Riverview Cemetery in Jefferson City.

Party political offices
Preceded by Walter Naylor Davis	Democratic nominee for Lieutenant Governor of Missouri; 1948, 1952	Succeeded by Edward V. Long
Preceded by Phil M. Donnelly	Democratic nominee for Governor of Missouri; 1956	Succeeded by John M. Dalton
Political offices
Preceded by Walter Naylor Davis	Lieutenant Governor of Missouri; 1949–1957	Succeeded by Edward V. Long
Preceded by Phil M. Donnelly	Governor of Missouri; 1957–1961	Succeeded by John M. Dalton
