= 1964 Missouri Secretary of State election =

- November 3, 1964
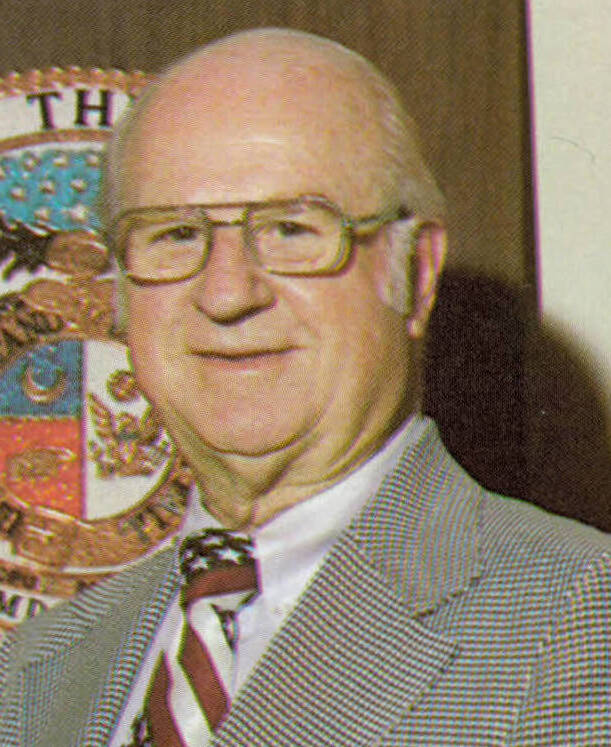

Nominee	James Kirkpatrick	William J. Jones
Party	Democratic	Republican
Popular vote	1,131,119	624,704
Percentage	64.42%	35.58%
Secretary of State before election
Warren E. Hearnes
Democratic
Elected Secretary of State
James Kirkpatrick
Democratic

The 1964 Missouri Secretary of State election was held on November 3, 1964, in order to elect the secretary of state of Missouri. Democratic nominee James Kirkpatrick defeated Republican nominee William J. Jones.

== General election ==
On election day, November 3, 1964, Democratic nominee James Kirkpatrick won the election by a margin of 506,415 votes against his opponent Republican nominee William J. Jones, thereby retaining Democratic control over the office of secretary of state. Kirkpatrick was sworn in as the 32nd secretary of state of Missouri on January 11, 1965.

=== Results ===
Missouri Secretary of State election, 1964
Party	Candidate	Votes	%
Democratic	James Kirkpatrick	1,131,119	64.42
Republican	William J. Jones	624,704	35.58
Total votes		1,755,823	100.00
Democratic hold			

== See also ==
- 1964 Missouri gubernatorial election
