= 1978 Missouri State Auditor election =

- November 7, 1978

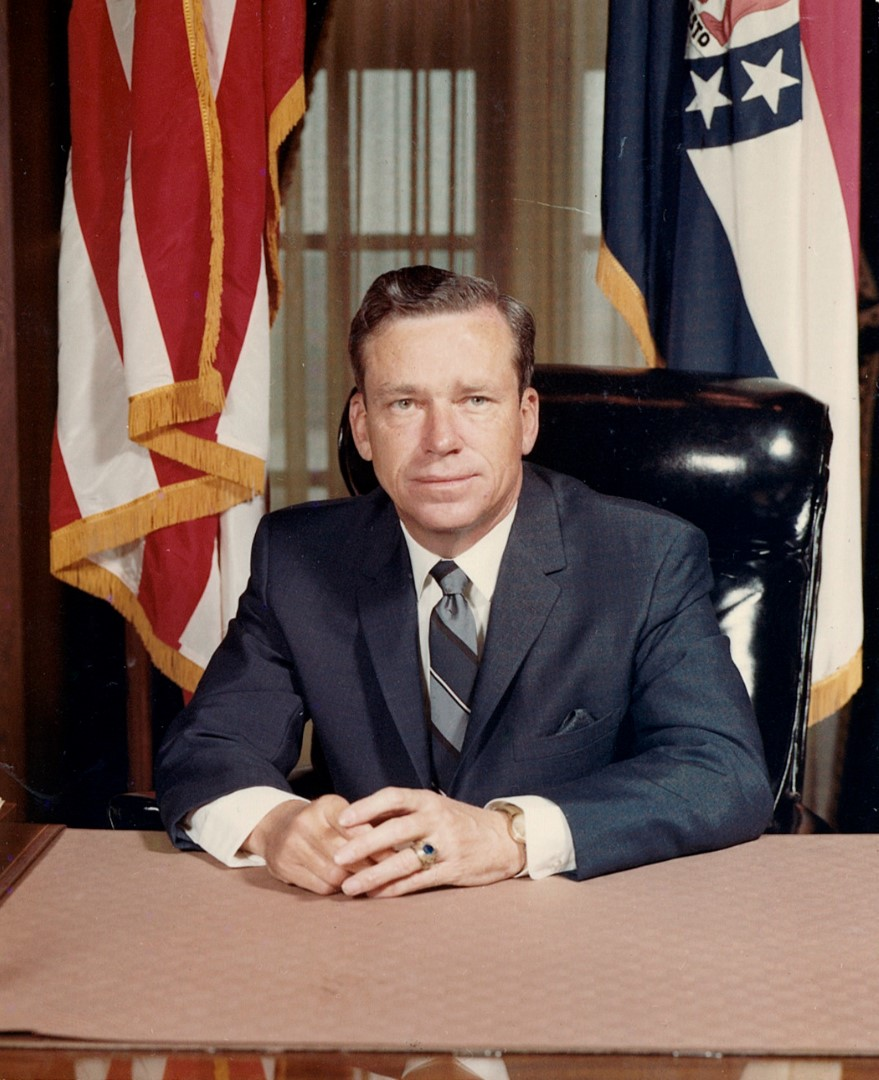
Nominee	James Antonio	Warren E. Hearnes
Party	Republican	Democratic
Popular vote	801,445	744,896
Percentage	51.83%	48.17%
State Auditor before election
Thomas M. Keyes (Acting)
Democratic
Elected State Auditor
James Antonio
Republican

The 1978 Missouri State Auditor election was held on November 7, 1978, in order to elect the state auditor of Missouri. Republican nominee James Antonio defeated Democratic nominee and former governor of Missouri Warren E. Hearnes.

== General election ==
On election day, November 7, 1978, Republican nominee James Antonio won the election by a margin of 56,549 votes against his opponent Democratic nominee Warren E. Hearnes, thereby gaining Republican control over the office of state auditor. Antonio was sworn in as the 32nd state auditor of Missouri on January 8, 1979.

=== Results ===
Missouri State Auditor election, 1978
Party	Candidate	Votes	%
Republican	James Antonio	801,445	51.83
Democratic	Warren E. Hearnes	744,896	48.17
Total votes		1,546,341	100.00
Republican gain from Democratic			
