= 1968 Missouri Secretary of State election =

- November 5, 1968
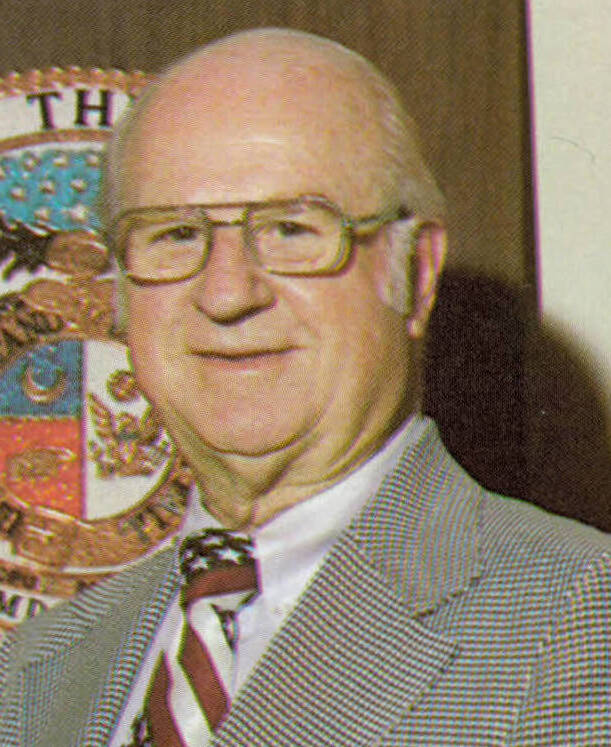

Nominee	James Kirkpatrick	Murray C. Colbert
Party	Democratic	Republican
Popular vote	995,742	699,765
Percentage	58.73%	41.27%
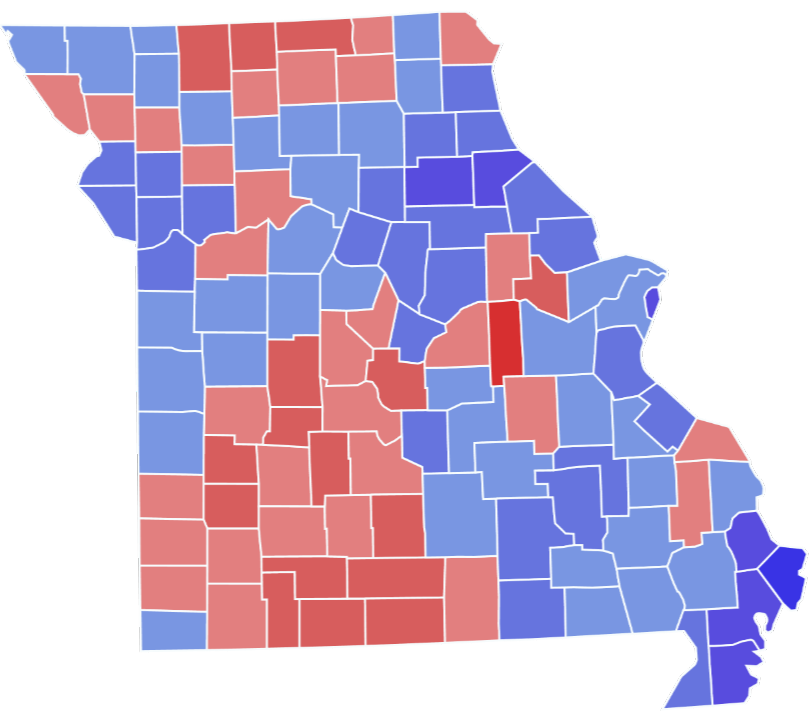
- County results Kirkpatrick: 50–60% 60–70% 70–80% 80–90% Colbert: 50–60% 60–70% 70–80%
Secretary of State before election
James Kirkpatrick
Democratic
Elected Secretary of State
James Kirkpatrick
Democratic

The 1968 Missouri Secretary of State election was held on November 5, 1968, in order to elect the secretary of state of Missouri. Democratic nominee and incumbent secretary of state James Kirkpatrick defeated Republican nominee Murray C. Colbert.

== General election ==
On election day, November 5, 1968, Democratic nominee James Kirkpatrick won re-election by a margin of 295,977 votes against his opponent Republican nominee Murray C. Colbert, thereby retaining Democratic control over the office of secretary of state. Kirkpatrick was sworn in for his second term on January 13, 1969.

=== Results ===
Missouri Secretary of State election, 1968
Party	Candidate	Votes	%
Democratic	James Kirkpatrick (incumbent)	995,742	58.73
Republican	Murray C. Colbert	699,765	41.27
Total votes		1,695,507	100.00
Democratic hold			

== See also ==
- 1968 Missouri gubernatorial election
