= 1972 Missouri Secretary of State election =

- November 7, 1972
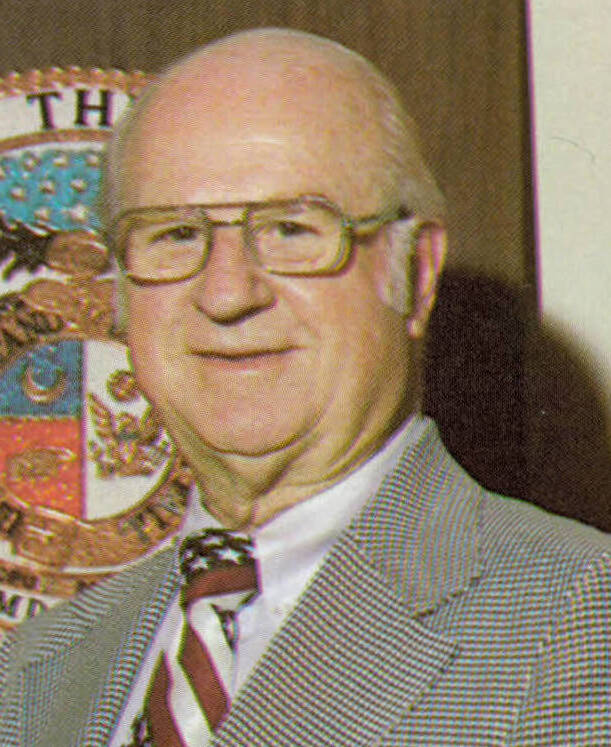

Nominee	James Kirkpatrick	Harold Kuehle
Party	Democratic	Republican
Popular vote	1,060,810	739,346
Percentage	58.93%	41.07%
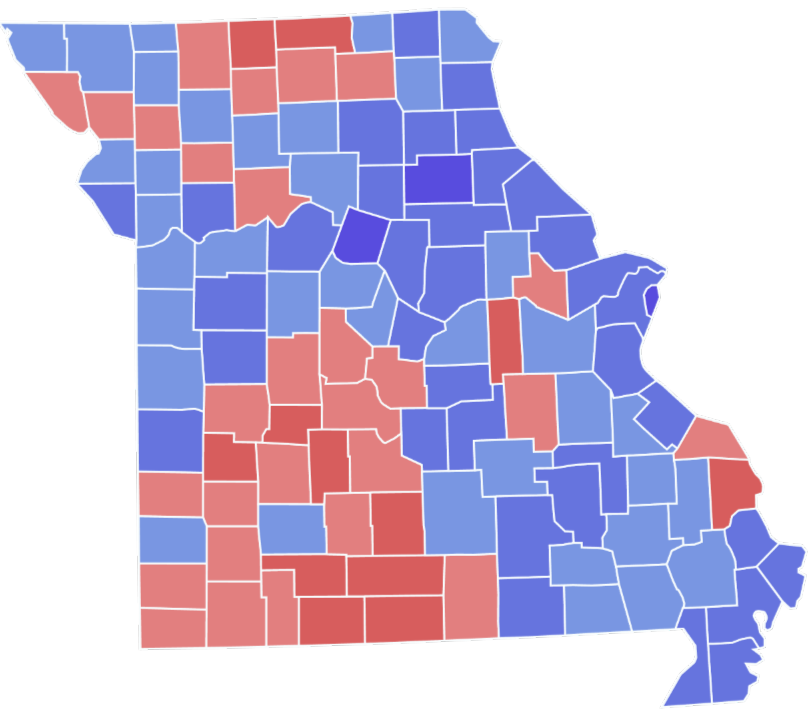
- County results Kirkpatrick: 50–60% 60–70% 70–80% Kuehle: 50–60% 60–70%
Secretary of State before election
James Kirkpatrick
Democratic
Elected Secretary of State
James Kirkpatrick
Democratic

The 1972 Missouri Secretary of State election was held on November 7, 1972, in order to elect the secretary of state of Missouri. Democratic nominee and incumbent secretary of state James Kirkpatrick defeated Republican nominee Harold Kuehle.

== General election ==
On election day, November 7, 1972, Democratic nominee James Kirkpatrick won re-election by a margin of 321,464 votes against his opponent Republican nominee Harold Kuehle, thereby retaining Democratic control over the office of secretary of state. Kirkpatrick was sworn in for his third term on January 8, 1973.

=== Results ===
Missouri Secretary of State election, 1972
Party	Candidate	Votes	%
Democratic	James Kirkpatrick (incumbent)	1,060,810	58.93
Republican	Harold Kuehle	739,346	41.07
Total votes		1,800,156	100.00
Democratic hold			

== See also ==
- 1972 Missouri gubernatorial election
