= 1968 Missouri Attorney General election =

- November 5, 1968
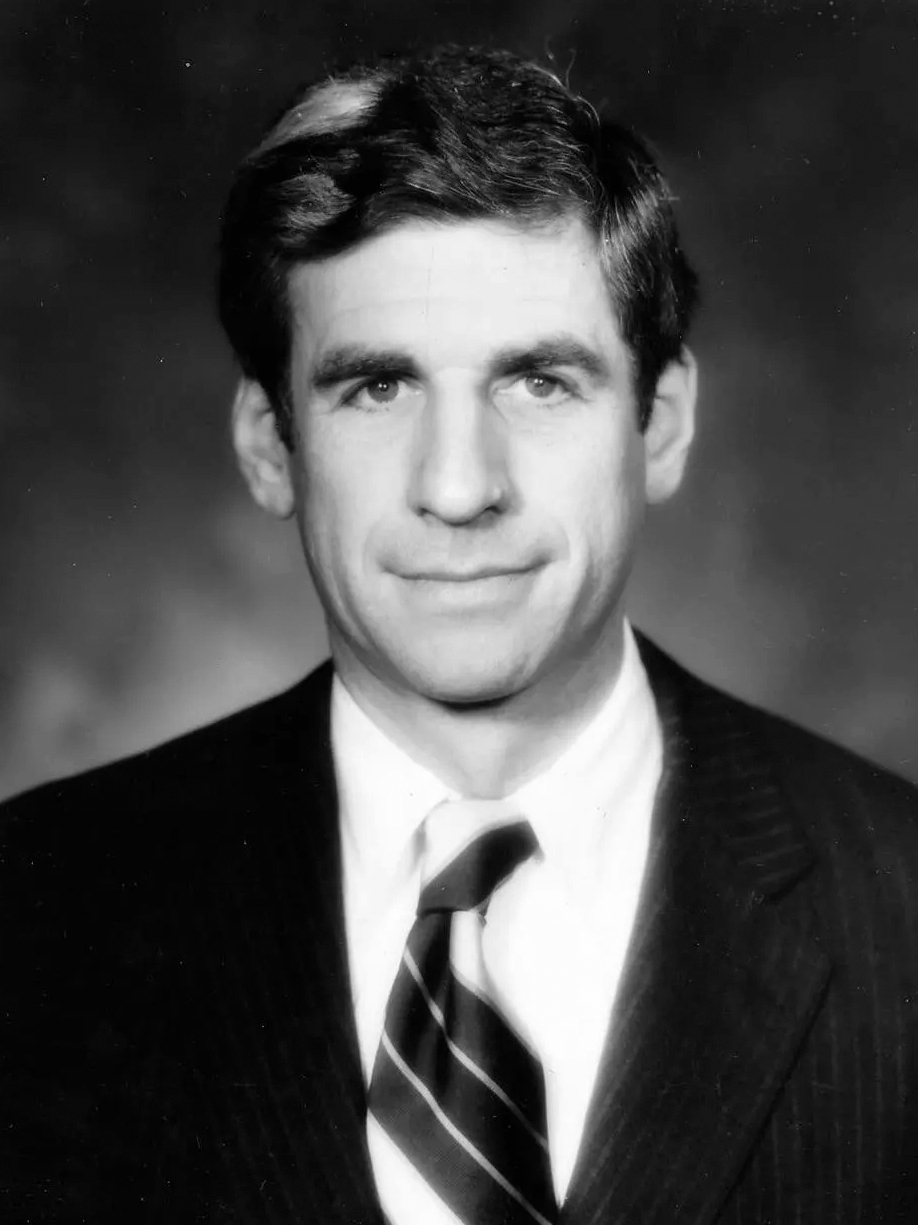

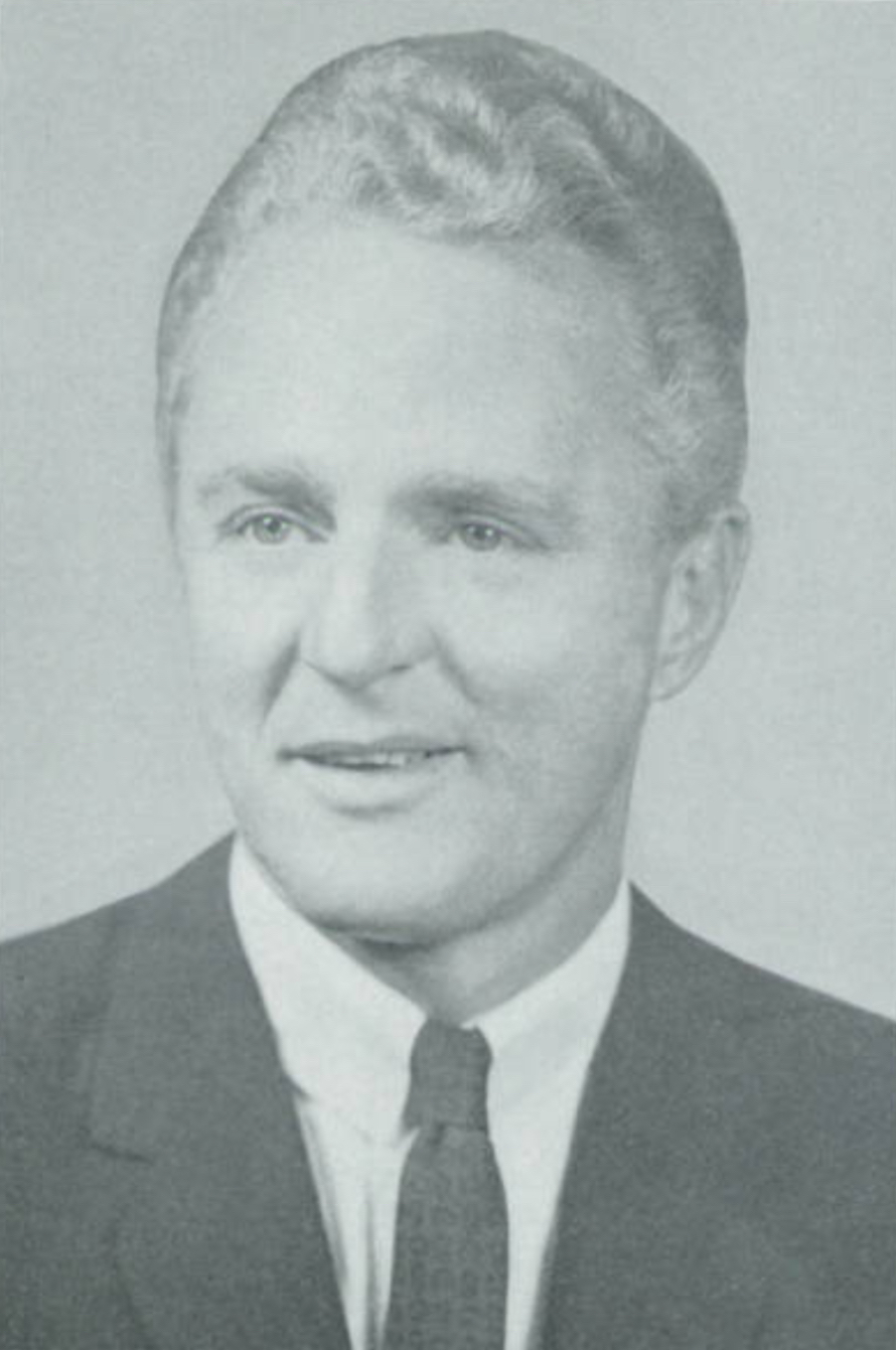
Nominee	John Danforth	Norman H. Anderson
Party	Republican	Democratic
Popular vote	891,498	819,365
Percentage	52.11%	47.89%
Attorney General before election
Norman H. Anderson
Democratic
Elected Attorney General
John Danforth
Republican

The 1968 Missouri Attorney General election was held on November 5, 1968, in order to elect the attorney general of Missouri. Republican nominee John Danforth defeated Democratic nominee and incumbent attorney general Norman H. Anderson.

== General election ==
On election day, November 5, 1968, Republican nominee John Danforth won the election by a margin of 72,133 votes against his opponent Democratic nominee Norman H. Anderson, thereby gaining Republican control over the office of attorney general. Danforth was sworn in as the 37th attorney general of Missouri on January 13, 1969.

=== Results ===
Missouri Attorney General election, 1968
Party	Candidate	Votes	%
Republican	John Danforth	891,498	52.11
Democratic	Norman H. Anderson (incumbent)	819,365	47.89
Total votes		1,710,863	100.00
Republican gain from Democratic			

== See also ==
- 1968 Missouri gubernatorial election
