= 1984 Missouri Secretary of State election =

- November 6, 1984
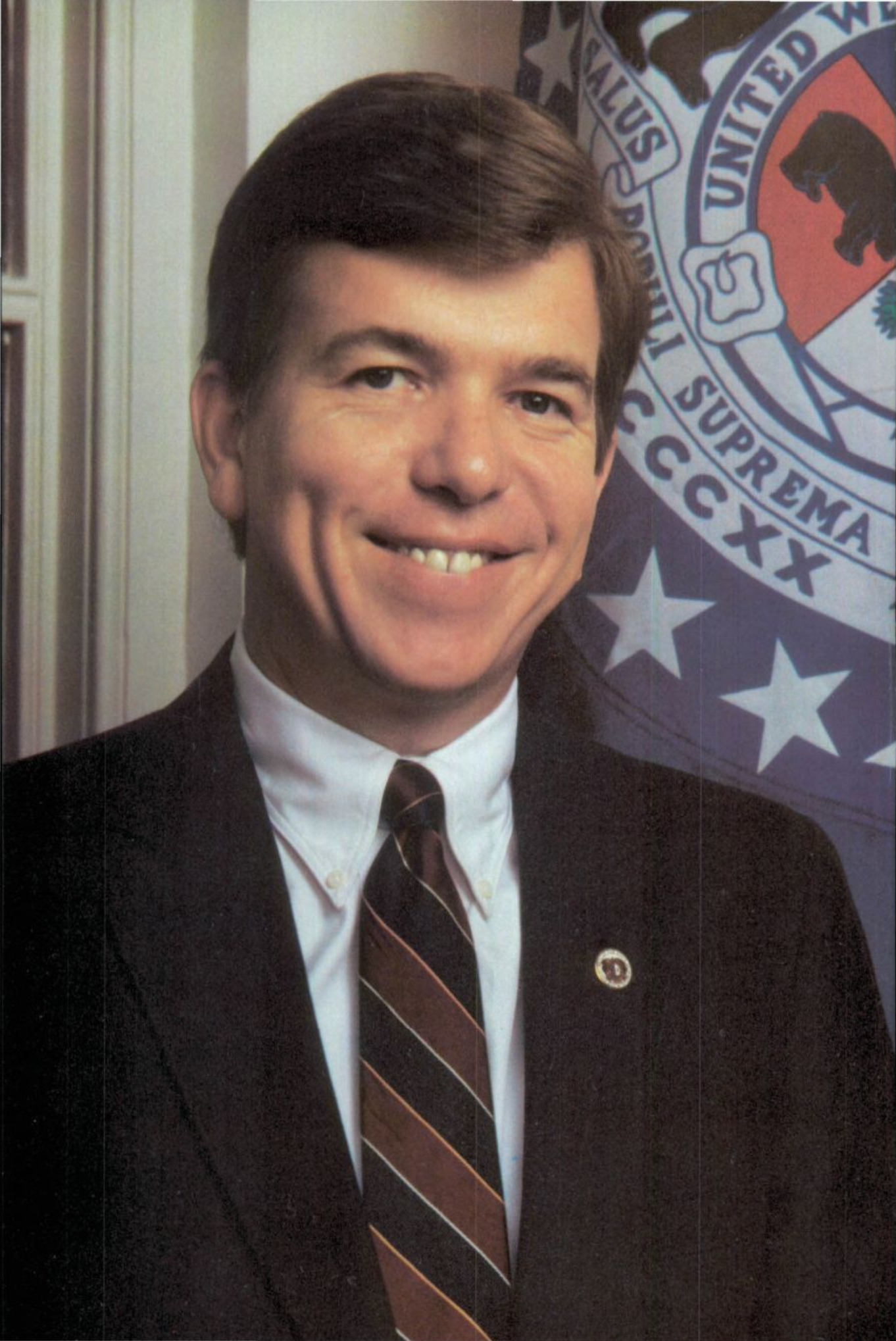

Nominee	Roy Blunt	Gary D. Sharpe
Party	Republican	Democratic
Popular vote	1,108,579	940,236
Percentage	54.11%	45.89%
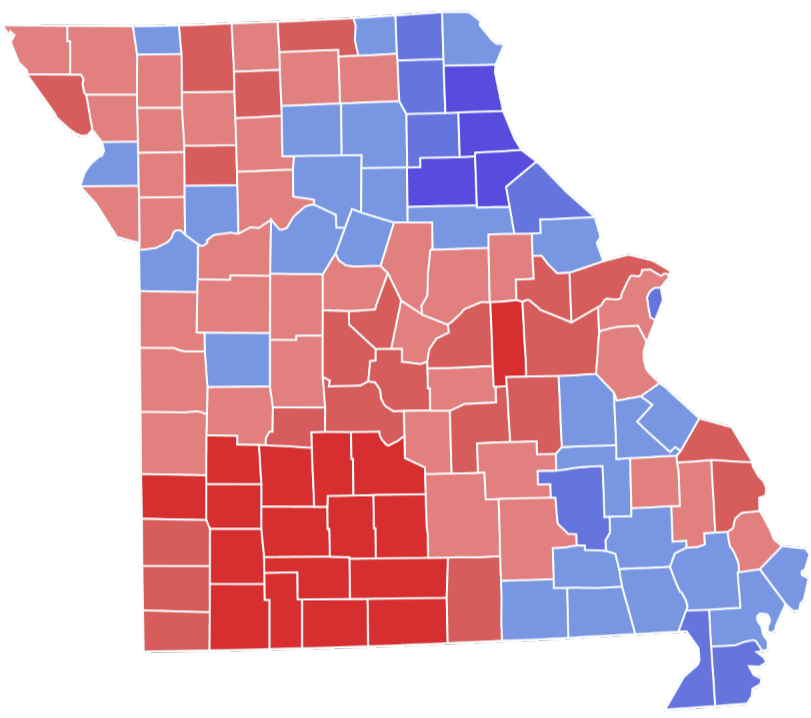
- County results Blunt: 50–60% 60–70% 70–80% Sharpe: 50–60% 60–70% 70–80%
Secretary of State before election
James Kirkpatrick
Democratic
Elected Secretary of State
Roy Blunt
Republican

The 1984 Missouri Secretary of State election was held on November 6, 1984, in order to elect the secretary of state of Missouri. Republican nominee Roy Blunt defeated Democratic nominee Gary D. Sharpe.

== General election ==
On election day, November 6, 1984, Republican nominee Roy Blunt won the election by a margin of 168,343 votes against his opponent Democratic nominee Gary D. Sharpe, thereby gaining Republican control over the office of secretary of state. Blunt was sworn in as the 33rd secretary of state of Missouri on January 8, 1985.

=== Results ===
Missouri Secretary of State election, 1984
Party	Candidate	Votes	%
Republican	Roy Blunt	1,108,579	54.11
Democratic	Gary D. Sharpe	940,236	45.89
Total votes		2,048,815	100.00
Republican gain from Democratic			

== See also ==
- 1984 Missouri gubernatorial election
