= 1982 Missouri State Auditor election =

- November 2, 1982

Nominee	James Antonio	James R. Butler
Party	Republican	Democratic
Popular vote	837,853	646,684
Percentage	56.44%	43.56%
State Auditor before election
James Antonio
Republican
Elected State Auditor
James Antonio
Republican

The 1982 Missouri State Auditor election was held on November 2, 1982, in order to elect the state auditor of Missouri. Republican nominee and incumbent state auditor James Antonio defeated Democratic nominee James R. Butler.

== General election ==
On election day, November 2, 1982, Republican nominee James Antonio won re-election by a margin of 191,169 votes against his opponent Democratic nominee James R. Butler, thereby retaining Republican control over the office of state auditor. Antonio was sworn in for his second term on January 11, 1983.

=== Results ===
Missouri State Auditor election, 1982
Party	Candidate	Votes	%
Republican	James Antonio (incumbent)	837,853	56.44
Democratic	James R. Butler	646,684	43.56
Total votes		1,484,537	100.00
Republican hold			
