= 1964 Missouri Attorney General election =

- November 3, 1964
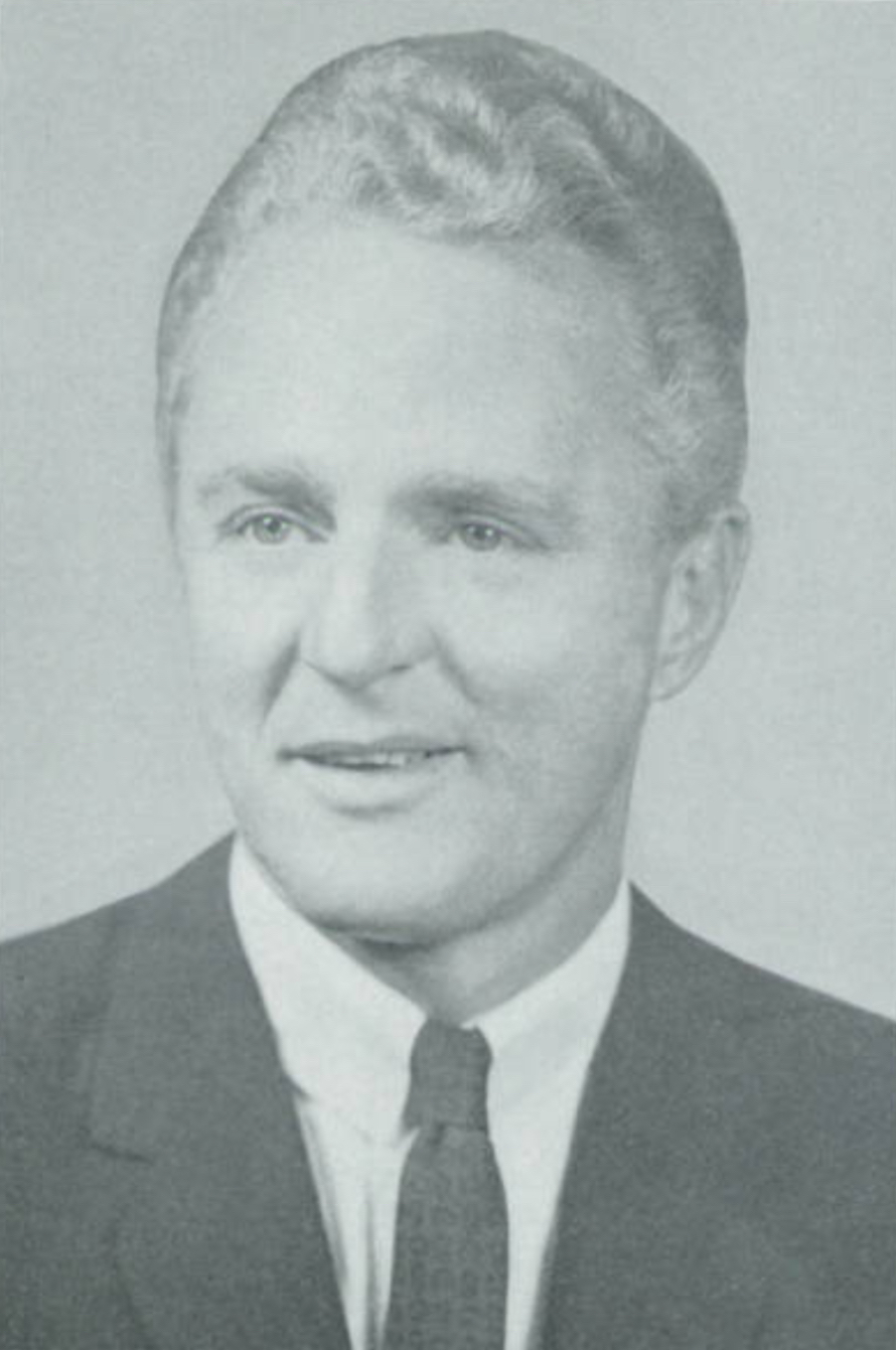

Nominee	Norman H. Anderson	Daniel Bartlett Jr.
Party	Democratic	Republican
Popular vote	1,120,555	631,953
Percentage	63.94%	36.06%
Attorney General before election
Thomas Eagleton
Democratic
Elected Attorney General
Norman H. Anderson
Democratic

The 1964 Missouri Attorney General election was held on November 3, 1964, in order to elect the attorney general of Missouri. Democratic nominee Norman H. Anderson defeated Republican nominee Daniel Bartlett Jr..

== General election ==
On election day, November 3, 1964, Democratic nominee Norman H. Anderson won the election by a margin of 488,602 votes against his opponent Republican nominee Daniel Bartlett Jr., thereby retaining Democratic control over the office of attorney general. Anderson was sworn in as the 36th attorney general of Missouri on January 11, 1965.

=== Results ===
Missouri Attorney General election, 1964
Party	Candidate	Votes	%
Democratic	Norman H. Anderson	1,120,555	63.94
Republican	Daniel Bartlett Jr.	631,953	36.06
Total votes		1,752,508	100.00
Democratic hold			

== See also ==
- 1964 Missouri gubernatorial election
