= 1980 Missouri Secretary of State election =

- November 4, 1980
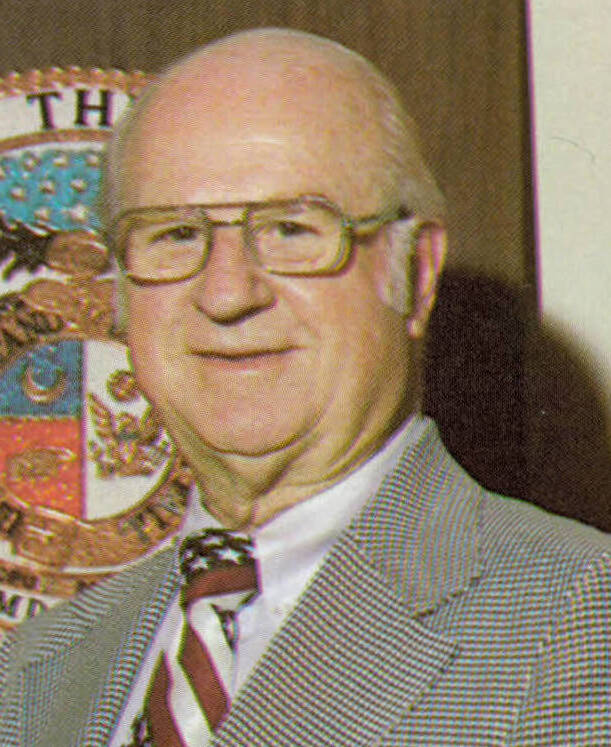

Nominee	James Kirkpatrick	Walter L. Pfeffer II
Party	Democratic	Republican
Popular vote	1,366,466	642,166
Percentage	68.03%	31.97%
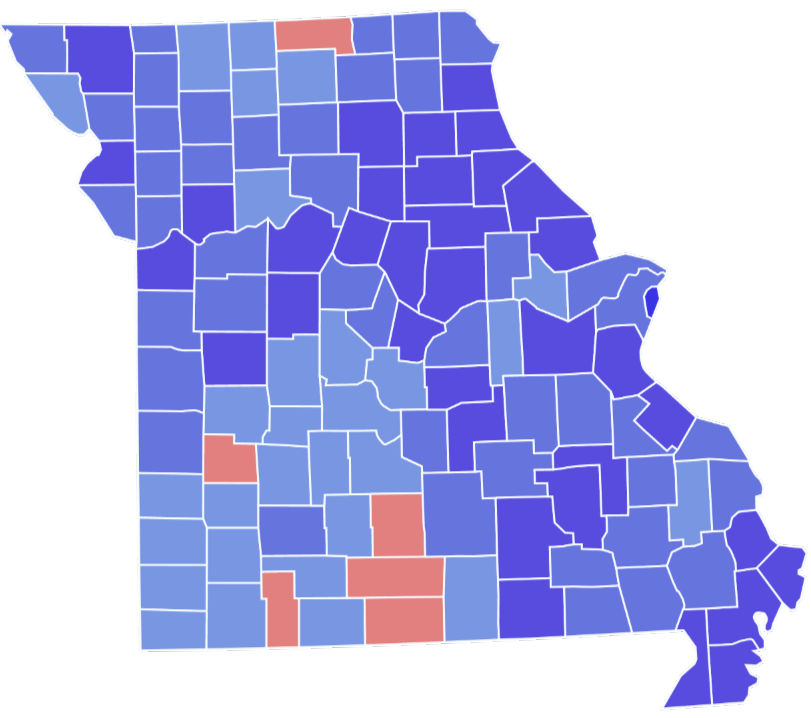
- County results Kirkpatrick: 50–60% 60–70% 70–80% 80–90% Pfeffer: 50–60%
Secretary of State before election
James Kirkpatrick
Democratic
Elected Secretary of State
James Kirkpatrick
Democratic

The 1980 Missouri Secretary of State election was held on November 4, 1980, in order to elect the secretary of state of Missouri. Democratic nominee and incumbent secretary of state James Kirkpatrick defeated Republican nominee Walter L. Pfeffer II.

== General election ==
On election day, November 4, 1980, Democratic nominee James Kirkpatrick won re-election by a margin of 724,300 votes against his opponent Republican nominee Walter L. Pfeffer II, thereby retaining Democratic control over the office of secretary of state. Kirkpatrick was sworn in for his fifth term on January 12, 1981.

=== Results ===
Missouri Secretary of State election, 1980
Party	Candidate	Votes	%
Democratic	James Kirkpatrick (incumbent)	1,366,466	68.03
Republican	Walter L. Pfeffer II	642,166	31.97
Total votes		2,008,632	100.00
Democratic hold			

== See also ==
- 1980 Missouri gubernatorial election
