= 1976 Missouri Secretary of State election =

- November 2, 1976
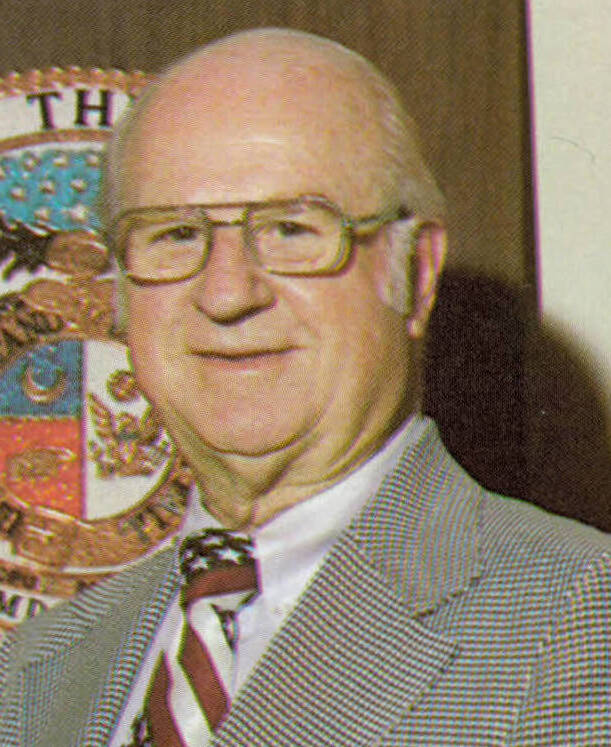

Nominee	James Kirkpatrick	Mildred P. Huffman
Party	Democratic	Republican
Popular vote	1,273,023	585,862
Percentage	67.91%	31.26%
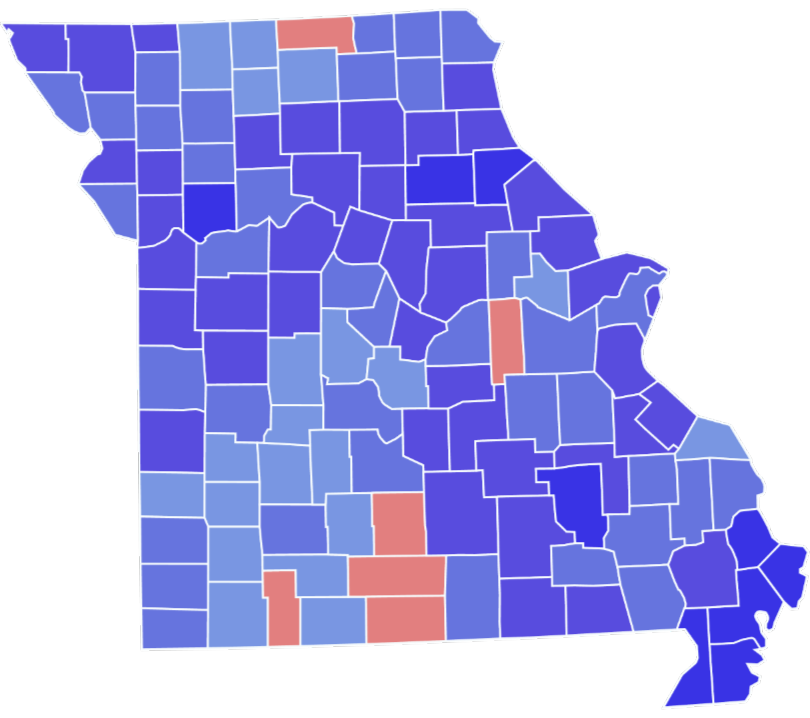
- County results Kirkpatrick: 50–60% 60–70% 70–80% 80–90% Huffman: 50–60%
Secretary of State before election
James Kirkpatrick
Democratic
Elected Secretary of State
James Kirkpatrick
Democratic

The 1976 Missouri Secretary of State election was held on November 2, 1976, in order to elect the secretary of state of Missouri. Democratic nominee and incumbent secretary of state James Kirkpatrick defeated Republican nominee Mildred P. Huffman and Nonpartisan candidate Evelyn F. Carmack.

== General election ==
On election day, November 2, 1976, Democratic nominee James Kirkpatrick won re-election by a margin of 687,161 votes against his foremost opponent Republican nominee Mildred P. Huffman, thereby retaining Democratic control over the office of secretary of state. Kirkpatrick was sworn in for his fourth term on January 10, 1977.

=== Results ===
Missouri Secretary of State election, 1976
Party	Candidate	Votes	%
Democratic	James Kirkpatrick (incumbent)	1,273,023	67.91
Republican	Mildred P. Huffman	585,862	31.26
Nonpartisan	Evelyn F. Carmack	15,584	0.83
Total votes		1,874,469	100.00
Democratic hold			

== See also ==
- 1976 Missouri gubernatorial election
