= James W. Symington =

American politician (born 1927)

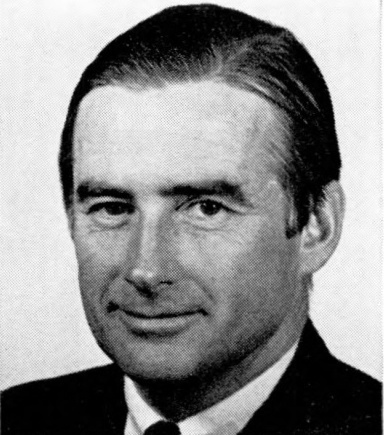

Member of the U.S. House of Representatives from Missouri's 2nd district
- In office January 3, 1969 – January 3, 1977
- Preceded by: Thomas B. Curtis
- Succeeded by: Robert A. Young

12th Chief of Protocol of the United States
- In office March 22, 1966 – March 31, 1968
- President: Lyndon B. Johnson
- Preceded by: Lloyd Nelson Hand
- Succeeded by: Angier Biddle Duke

Personal details
- Born: James Wadsworth Symington; September 28, 1927 (age 98) Rochester, New York, U.S.
- Party: Democratic
- Spouse: Sylvia Schlapp (m. 1953)
- Children: 2
- Parent: Stuart Symington (father)
- Relatives: Symington family
- Education: Yale University (BA); Columbia University (LLB)
- Awards: Order of Friendship (2008)

Military service
- Allegiance: United States
- Branch: United States Marine Corps
- Service years: 1945–1946
- Rank: Private (first class)
- Conflict: World War II

James Wadsworth Symington (/ˈsaɪmɪŋtən/ SY-ming-tən; born September 28, 1927) is an American lawyer and politician who served as a member of the United States House of Representatives for four terms representing St. Louis County, Missouri from 1969 to 1977. Prior to that, in the late 1960s, he served as Chief of Protocol of the United States from 1966 to 1968 under President of the United States Lyndon B. Johnson. He is a member of the Democratic Party.

== Biography ==
=== Youth, family, and education ===
Symington, son of Stuart Symington (United States Senate member from Missouri) and Evelyn (Wadsworth) Symington, was born on September 28, 1927, in Rochester, New York. Through his mother, he is the grandson of James W. Wadsworth Jr., a politician from New York who served in both chambers of the United States Congress, and a great-grandson of James W. Wadsworth, a U.S. House of Representatives member from New York who was state comptroller of New York, and John Hay, the 37th United States Secretary of State.

James attended St. Bernard's School in New York City, Mary Institute and St. Louis Country Day School in St. Louis. In 1945, he graduated from Deerfield Academy in Massachusetts and enlisted in the United States Marine Corps at the age of 17. He served in the Marine Corps as a Private first class from 1945 to 1946.

Symington earned his Bachelor of Arts degree from Yale University in 1950 where he sang as a member of The Whiffenpoofs and as a member of the Glee Club. He also joined Berzelius secret society, according to the 1950 Yale Banner. He graduated from Columbia Law School in 1954. He married the former Sylvia Caroline Schapp on January 24, 1953 at The Church of St. Michael & St. George in Clayton, Missouri. Together, they had two children and five grandchildren.

=== Early legal career and public service ===
After graduating from law school, Symington served for two years as Assistant City Counselor (1954–1955) for St. Louis. In 1958, Symington entered the United States Foreign Service and was posted to London as assistant to John Hay Whitney, the ambassador of the United States to the United Kingdom and his cousin one time removed.

He served in this role until 1960, when he returned to private practice in Washington, D.C., where he served in a series of roles in government from 1961 to 1968: deputy director, Food for Peace (1961–1962); administrative assistant to United States Attorney General Robert F. Kennedy (1962–1963); director, President's Committee on Juvenile Delinquency (1965–1966); consultant, President's Commission on Law Enforcement and Administration of Justice (1965–1966); and Chief of Protocol of the United States (1966–1968).

=== Congressional career ===
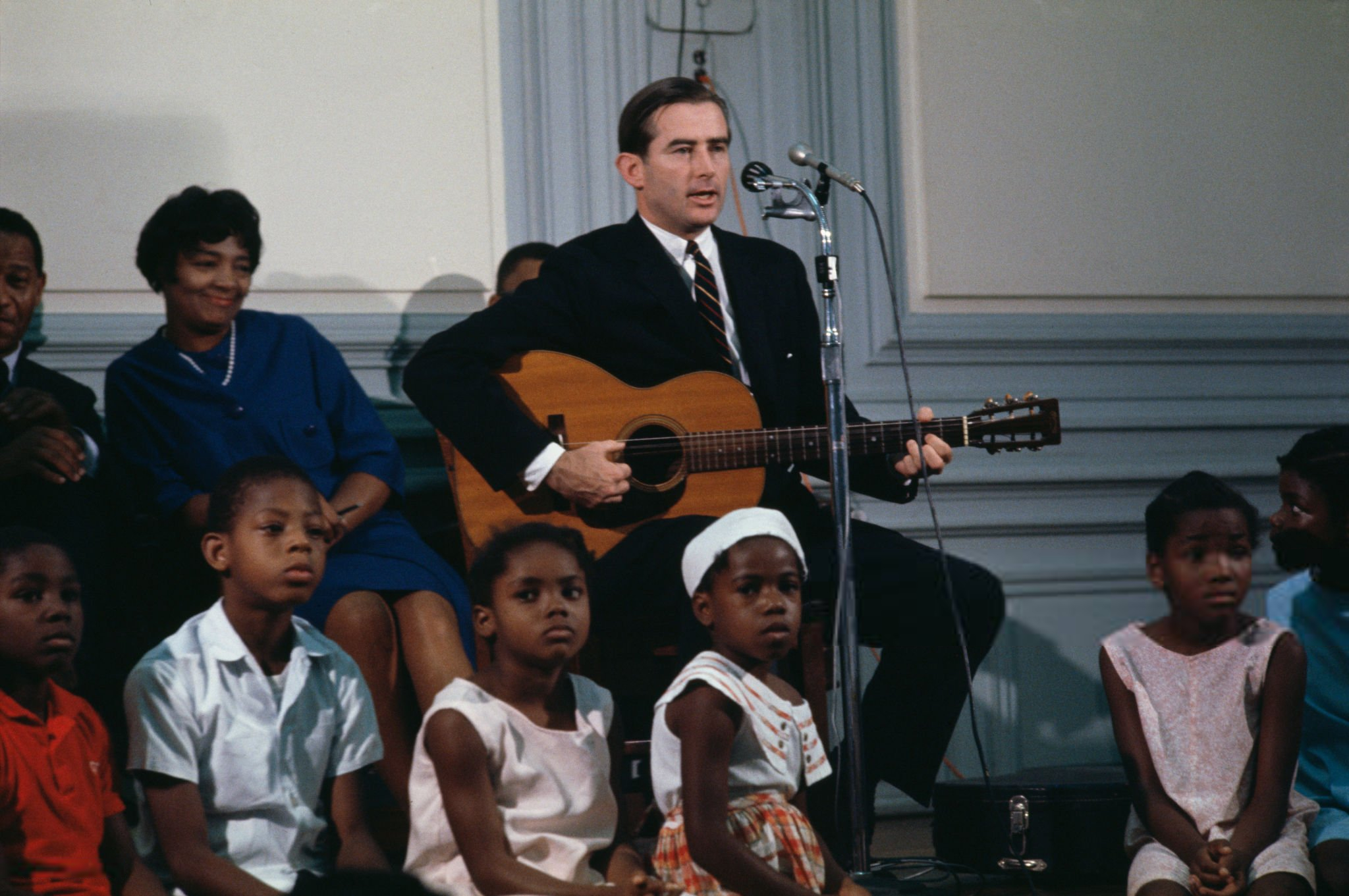
Symington plays the guitar and sings to children from Junior Village at the District Building, Washington D.C., August 25, 1967

In 1968, Symington was elected to the 91st United States Congress to represent Missouri's 2nd congressional district. He served four terms in the United States House of Representatives from 1969 to 1977. While in the U.S. House of Representatives, he served on the United States House Committee on Energy and Commerce and the United States House Committee on Science, Space, and Technology, chairing the subcommittees on Space Science and Applications; Science, Research & Technology; and International Cooperation.

In the 1976 United States Senate election in Missouri, he chose not to seek his seat for a fifth term; rather, he made an unsuccessful bid for the Democratic nomination to fill the United States Senate seat vacated by his father, who retired after serving four terms. He faced Governor of Missouri Warren E. Hearnes and U.S. House of Representatives member Jerry Litton in the Democratic primary.

Litton won the primary, but was killed when his plane crashed en route to the victory party. Hearnes was named the Democratic candidate and ultimately lost to Republican Party candidate John Danforth. At the end of his congressional term, Symington returned to the Washington, D.C.–based law firm Smathers, Symington & Herlong as a partner.

=== Post-congressional roles ===
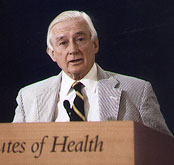
Symington in 2001

Symington served as director of The Atlantic Council from 1986 to 2001, and as director of the Library of Congress Russian Leadership Program in 2001. In 1992, he founded the American-Russian Cultural Cooperation Foundation, which he chaired from its inception until 2015. Symington was awarded the Order of Friendship by President of Russia Vladimir Putin in 2008. He also made occasional appearances as a singer.

Symington appeared as a commentator in the 1990 Ken Burns film The Civil War. As of 2001, he was practicing law with the law firm of Nossaman LLP/O'Connor & Hannan, where he specialized in legislative and administrative representation. Symington was also a writer. A collection of his poems, songs, and prose, A Muse 'N Washington: Beltway Ballads and Beyond, was published in 1999.

== Notes ==
U.S. House of Representatives
Preceded by Thomas B. Curtis	Member of the U.S. House of Representatives from Missouri's 2nd congressional district 1969–1977	Succeeded by Robert A. Young
U.S. order of precedence (ceremonial)
Preceded by David F. Emery as Former U.S. Representative	Order of precedence of the United States as Former U.S. Representative	Succeeded by Pat Danner as Former U.S. Representative
