= 1970 United States Senate election in Missouri =

- November 3, 1970
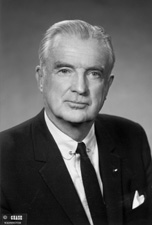

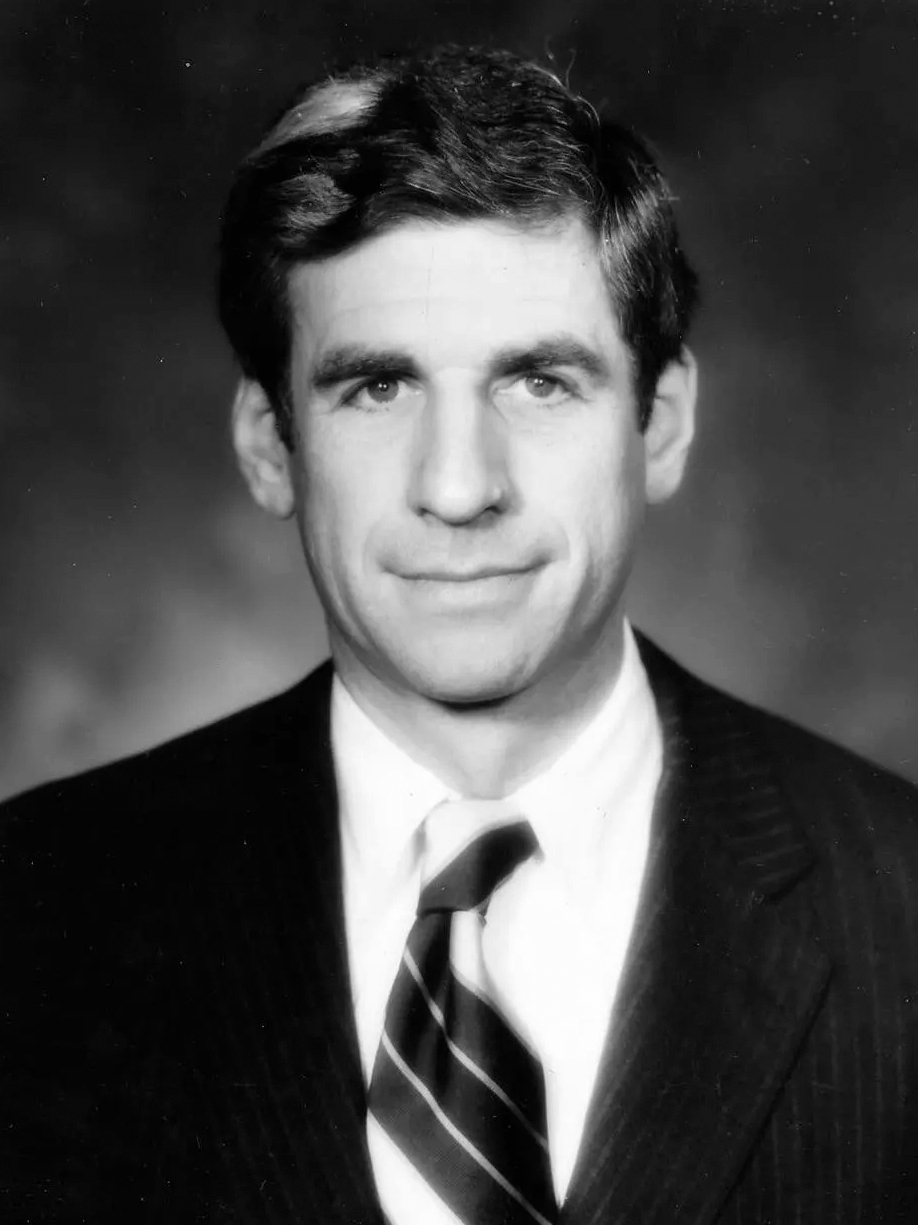
Nominee	Stuart Symington	John Danforth
Party	Democratic	Republican
Popular vote	654,831	617,903
Percentage	51.03%	48.15%
- County results Symington: 40–50% 50–60% 60–70% 70–80% Danforth: 50–60% 60–70% 70–80%
U.S. senator before election
Stuart Symington
Democratic
Elected U.S. Senator
Stuart Symington
Democratic

The 1970 United States Senate election in Missouri took place on November 3, 1970. Incumbent Democratic U.S. Senator Stuart Symington was re-elected to a fourth term in office over Republican John Danforth (who would eventually succeed the retiring Symington in 1976).

== Democratic primary ==
=== Candidates ===
- Hershel V. Page
- Stuart Symington, incumbent Senator since 1953
- Lee C. Sutton, former State Representative from Monroe County (1955–61)
- William McKinley Thomas
- Douglas V. White

=== Results ===
1970 Democratic U.S. Senate primary
Party	Candidate	Votes	%
Democratic	Stuart Symington (incumbent)	392,670	89.28%
Democratic	Douglas V. White	15,187	3.45%
Democratic	William McKinley Thomas	13,018	2.96%
Democratic	Lee Sutton	11,105	2.53%
Democratic	Hershel V. Page	7,843	1.78%
Total votes		439,823	100.00%

== Republican primary ==
=== Candidates ===
- Doris M. Bass, St. Louis City Alderman
- John Danforth, Attorney General of Missouri
- Morris Duncan, perennial candidate

=== Results ===
1970 Republican U.S. Senate primary
Party	Candidate	Votes	%
Republican	John Danforth	165,728	72.55%
Republican	Doris Bass	45,049	19.72%
Republican	Morris Duncan	17,670	7.74%
Total votes		228,447	100.00%

== American Party primary ==
=== Candidates ===
- Gene Chapman
- Ralph A. DePugh, Jackson County deputy sheriff
- Lawrence "Red" Petty

=== Results ===
1970 American Party U.S. Senate primary
Party	Candidate	Votes	%
American	Gene Chapman	684	47.11%
American	Lawrence Petty	400	27.55%
American	Ralph A. DePugh	368	25.34%
Total votes		1,452	100.00%

== General election ==
Considered a safely Democratic state, Symington was seen as an overwhelming favorite, leading in one poll 54% to 28%. His campaign focused on his seniority, criticizing Richard Nixon, and generally ignoring his opponent, even refusing debates. That said, Danforth was seen as a possible contender for an upset. Near the campaigns end, Danforth was seen as closing the gap, providing a real threat to Symington. Symington won the race by just under 3 points.

=== Results ===
General election results
Party	Candidate	Votes	%	±%
Democratic	Stuart Symington (incumbent)	654,831	51.03%	▼15.52
Republican	John Danforth	617,903	48.15%	▲14.70
American	Gene Chapman	10,065	0.78%	N/A
Independent	Emilio J. DiGirolamo	513	0.04%	N/A
Turnout		1,283,312	100.00%	
Democratic hold				

== See also ==
- 1970 United States Senate elections
