= Jerry Litton =

American politician (1937–1976)

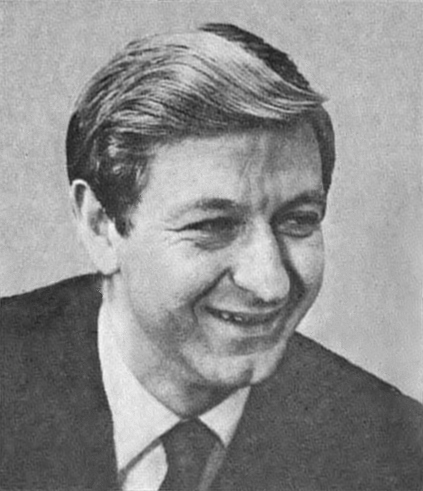
- Official portrait, c. 1973

Member of the U.S. House of Representatives from Missouri's 6th district
- In office January 3, 1973 – August 3, 1976
- Preceded by: William Raleigh Hull Jr.
- Succeeded by: Tom Coleman

Personal details
- Born: Jerry Lon Litton; May 12, 1937 Lock Springs, Missouri, U.S.
- Died: August 3, 1976 (aged 39) Chillicothe, Missouri, U.S.
- Cause of death: Airplane crash
- Resting place: Resthaven Memorial Gardens
- Party: Democratic
- Spouse: Sharon Litton (m. 1959)
- Children: 2
- Parents: Charley Litton (father); Mildred Litton (mother)
- Education: University of Missouri, Columbia (BS)
- Occupation: Politician
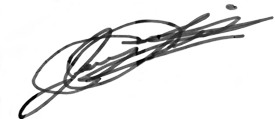
- Signature

Military service
- Allegiance: United States
- Branch/service: United States Army National Guard
- Years of service: 1955-1962

Jerry Lon Litton (May 12, 1937 – August 3, 1976) was an American politician from Missouri who served as a member of the United States House of Representatives representing Missouri's 6th congressional district from 1973 until his death in 1976. A member of the Democratic Party, he ran for United States Senate in 1976. Litton won the Democratic primary; however, he died in a plane crash while heading to his victory party.

== Early life ==
Litton was born near Lock Springs, Missouri, in a house without electricity. He was Missouri state president (1955–1956) and national secretary (1956–1957) of the Future Farmers of America (FFA), and he later graduated from the University of Missouri in 1961 with a B.S. in Journalism. He was president of the University of Missouri Young Democrats and chair of the National Youth for Stuart Symington during Symington's unsuccessful 1960 run for U.S. President. Litton served as President of the Theta chapter of the Alpha Gamma Rho fraternity.

He made his fortune raising cattle at the Litton Charolais Cattle Ranch in Chillicothe, Missouri. This ranch was maintained as a beautiful showplace where he entertained both the well-connected and constituents. Litton made a point to bring schoolchildren and low-level local leaders to his home. Before he began his political career, he was active in promoting youth involvement in leadership in agriculture and rural communities. His family, including his parents, Mildred and Charley Litton, was very prominent in the Charolais cattle business.

== U.S. Representative ==
Litton was elected to the U.S. House as a Democrat in 1972, assuming office at the beginning of the 93rd Congress, and succeeding retiring Rep. William R. Hull Jr. (D). In this election, Litton defeated the Republican nominee, Russell Sloan.

Elected to represent Missouri's 6th congressional district, he was considered a rising star in the Democratic Party following his election to the House, and his television show Dialogue with Litton was broadcast statewide. Among the guests were Jimmy Carter, former Vice President Hubert Humphrey, Secretary of Agriculture Earl Butz, Congressman Tip O'Neill, and House Speaker Carl Albert.

Green bumper stickers, like those used in his prior Congressional campaigns, circulated in the state, saying "Litton for President". Jimmy Carter said that he thought Litton would be president one day.

Rep. Litton was re-elected to a second term in the House in 1974, defeating the Republican nominee, Grover H. Speers in a landslide. His service in the nation's lower legislature continued throughout most of the 94th United Congress.

== 1976 U.S. Senate election ==
In 1976, while serving out only his second term in the House of Representatives, Litton entered into what amounted to a three-way Democratic Party primary race for the U.S. Senate seat of retiring Democratic U.S. senator and former 1960 presidential election candidate Stuart Symington. The other two major contenders for the nomination were Symington's son, U.S. Rep. James W. Symington (MO-2), and former Missouri governor Warren Hearnes. Final election tabulations showed Litton winning a plurality of Democratic support, winning the primary with 45.39% of the total vote. Former Governor Warren Hearnes placed second with a distant 26.38%, and Rep. James Symington finished third with 25.16% of the statewide vote. Seven other candidates, including Kansas City mayor Charles Wheeler, split the remaining 4 percent of the vote amongst themselves.

== Death ==
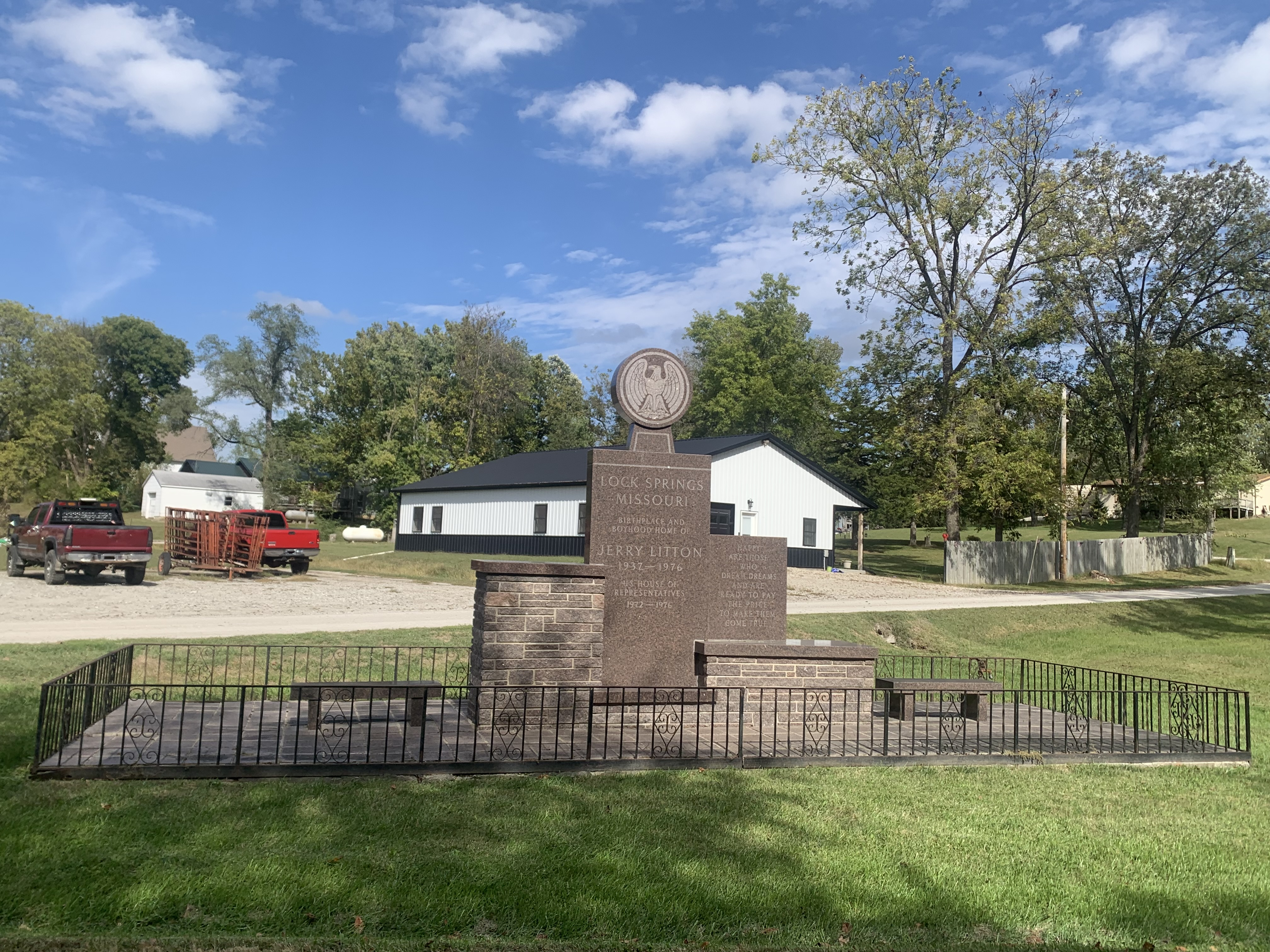
Jerry Litton Memorial in Lock Springs

While Litton won the Democratic primary for U.S. Senate, his victory was short-lived. He died the evening of Tuesday, August 3, 1976, along with his entire family (wife Sharon and their two children, Linda and Scott), pilot Paul Rupp Jr., and the pilot's son, Paul Rupp III, as they departed together for the Litton campaign's victory party in Kansas City. The group's aircraft, a Beechcraft Model 58 Baron, crashed during take-off from the Chillicothe Municipal Airport in Chillicothe, Missouri, shortly after 9 p.m. on election night.

The investigation into the crash determined the twin-engine plane broke a crankshaft in the left engine. The plane was about 100 to 150 feet (30 to 46 m) above the airport's only hard-surfaced runway when the engine failed. The plane veered to the left and crashed rapidly into a soybean field, where it exploded on impact, burning all victims beyond recognition.

The NTSB reported that the pilot did not retract the wheels when the engine cut off and that this contributed to the sudden loss of control. The report said the plane had been airborne for only 19 seconds before striking the ground. The plane was owned by Rupp Automotive, which was the car parts store owned by Rupp.

The State Democratic Committee held a vote on a new nominee on August 21, and Hearnes defeated Missouri State Treasurer Jim Spainhower, garnering 63.3% of the vote. Hearnes proceeded to lose the general election to the Republican nominee, Missouri Attorney General John Danforth, who garnered 56.93% of the vote.

A museum of Litton memorabilia was opened in the Jerry L. Litton Visitor Center near the dam at Smithville Lake, in Smithville, Missouri.

== See also ==
- List of members of the United States Congress who died in office (1950–1999)

U.S. House of Representatives
Preceded by William Raleigh Hull Jr.	Member of the U.S. House of Representatives from Missouri's 6th congressional district 1973–1976	Succeeded by Tom Coleman
Party political offices
Preceded by Stuart Symington	Democratic nominee for U.S. Senator from Missouri (Class 1); 1976	Succeeded by Warren E. Hearnes
