= 1976 United States Senate election in Missouri =

- November 2, 1976
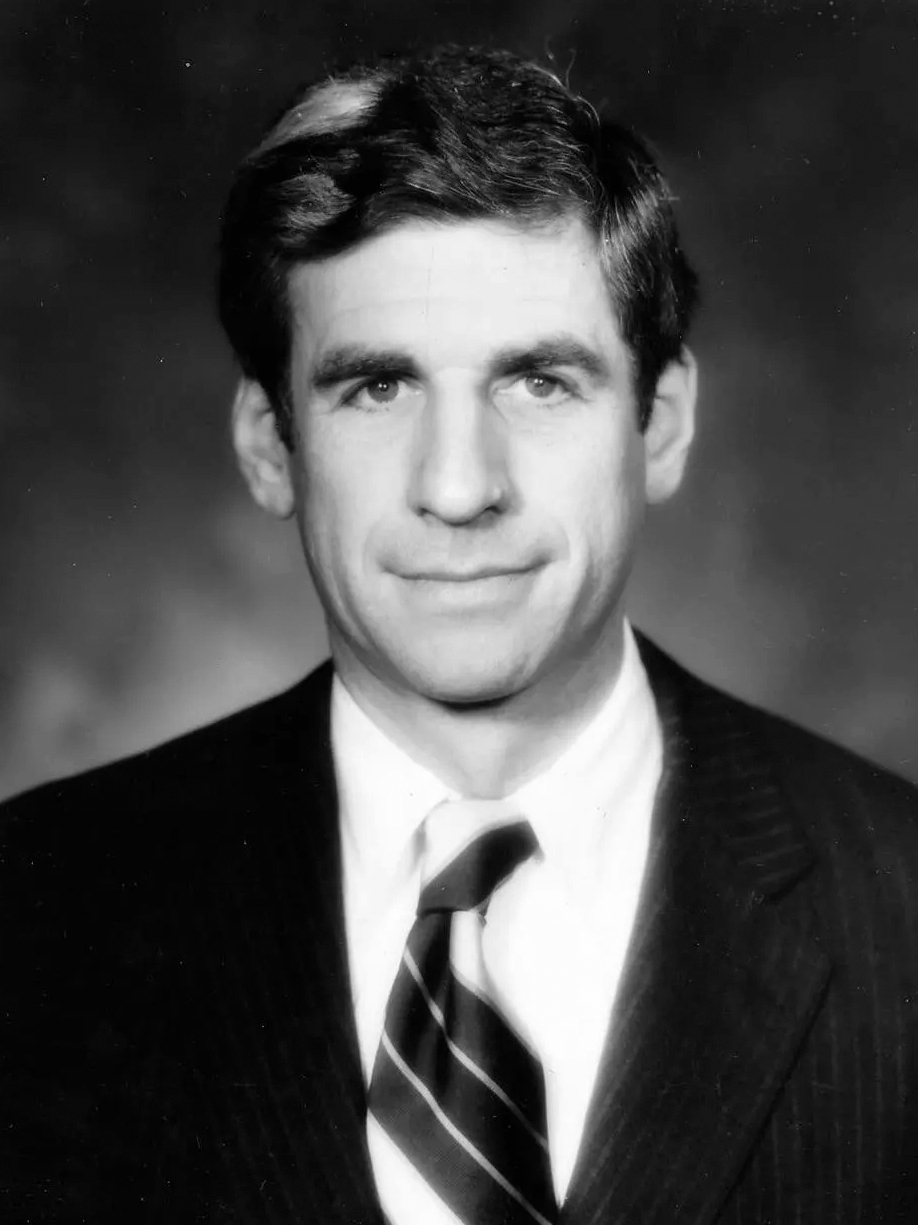

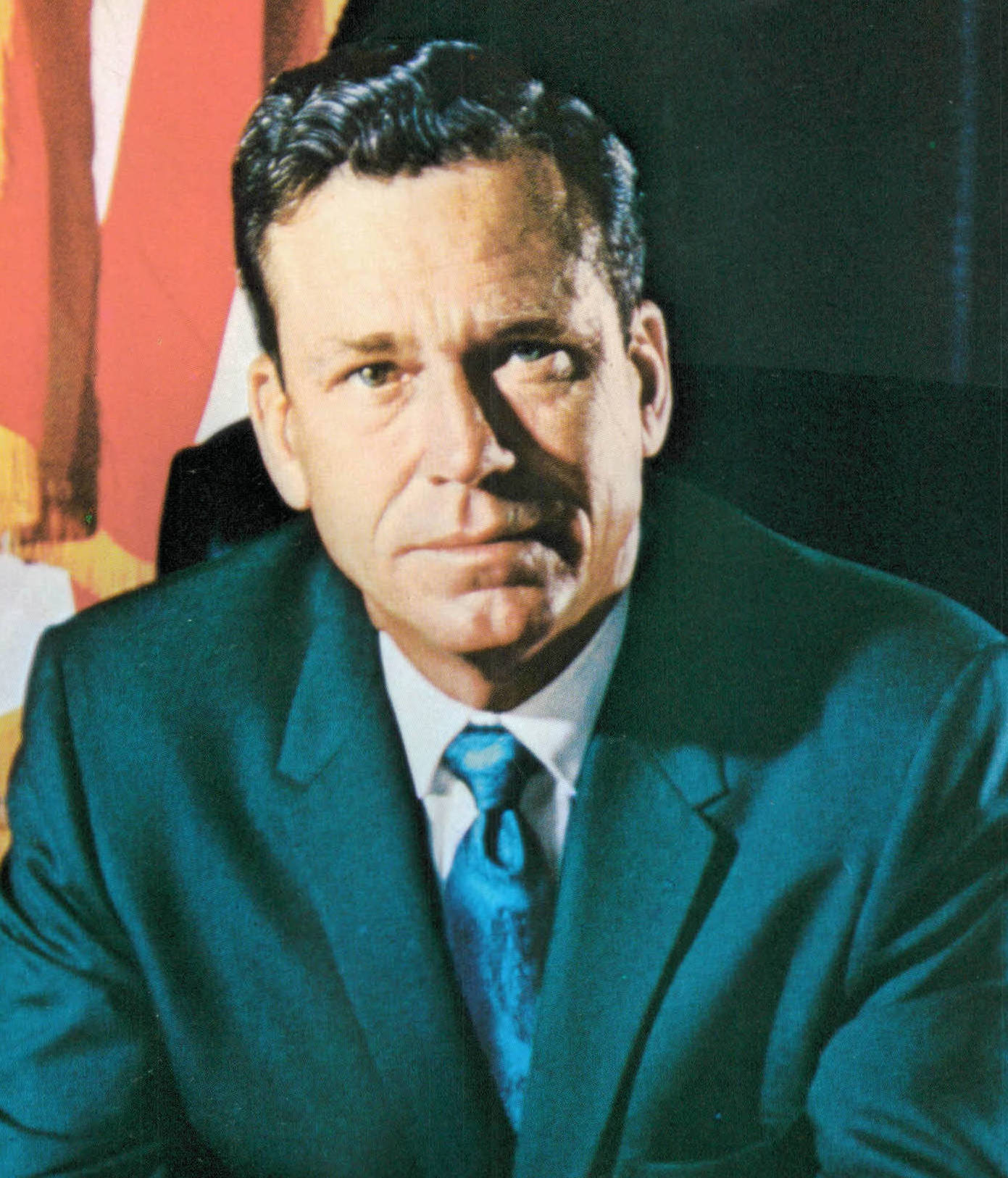
Nominee	John Danforth	Warren E. Hearnes
Party	Republican	Democratic
Popular vote	1,090,067	813,571
Percentage	56.94%	42.50%
- County results Danforth: 50–60% 60–70% 70–80% Hearnes: 50–60% 60–70% 70–80%
U.S. senator before election
Stuart Symington
Democratic
Elected U.S. Senator
John Danforth
Republican

The 1976 United States Senate election in Missouri took place on November 2, 1976. Incumbent Democratic U.S. Senator Stuart Symington decided to retire, instead of seeking a fifth term.

On the Democratic side, former Governor Warren Hearnes competed with Symington's son Congressman James Symington and Congressman Jerry Litton for the Democratic nomination. Litton defeated Hearnes and Symington, but on the night of the primary, Litton was killed in a plane crash on his way to a victory party. In a replacement vote held by the Missouri Democratic Party, Hearnes defeated James Spainhower for the nomination.

On the Republican side, Missouri Attorney General John Danforth, the nominee for this seat in 1970, ran for this seat a second time. Danforth defeated Hearnes, who had been caught up in a federal investigation over his tax returns.

== Democratic primary ==
=== Candidates ===
- Warren Hearnes, former governor of Missouri
- Horace Kingery
- Jerry Litton, U.S. representative from Chillicothe
- Terry Richards
- Lee Sutton, former state representative
- James W. Symington, U.S. representative from Ladue and son of incumbent Senator Stuart Symington
- William McKinley Thomas, perennial candidate
- Norman L. Tucker
- Jim C. Tyler
- Charles Wheeler, mayor of Kansas City

=== Withdrew ===
- Joseph Teasdale, attorney, candidate for governor in 1972

=== Campaign ===
The race for the Democratic nomination began before the announcement of incumbent Senator Stuart Symington's retirement. In December 1974, Joseph Teasdale, a Kansas City attorney and former gubernatorial candidate, filed first. Teasdale would eventually withdraw in November 1975, and become a successful candidate for governor.

For the most part, Symington had said he planned to run for a fifth term, though many Democrats had grown skeptical that he actually would do so. On April 22, 1975, Symington officially announced his intent to retire, kicking off the race for a now open seat. Even before Symington's retirement, the race was seen as a contest between three main contenders.

The first was former Governor Warren Hearnes. As early as June 1974, Hearnes made his intentions clear to consider a run, regardless of Symington's plans. A central focus of his candidacy was the issue of federal deficit spending. To bolster his candidacy, Hearnes secured the endorsement of prominent Democrats such as State Auditor George Lehr, and even other prominent leaders in St. Louis. Some of these endorsements were, however, marred by charges that supporters of Hearnes forced some of these endorsements against the will of some of the members of the groups who made these endorsements. Hearnes started out with a bigger cash advantage, in addition to more endorsements, and was seen as the frontrunner, with Attorney General John Danforth calling him 'formidable'. However, Hearnes was embroiled in an investigation by a federal grand jury over finance issues, not only personal finances, but finances from his gubernatorial tenure as well.

The second most prominent candidate was James Symington, a congressman representing Missouri's 2nd District, and the son of Stuart Symington. Symington hailed from the St. Louis area. While not to the same extent as Hearnes, Symington had some level of institutional support. This included the support of State Treasurer James Spainhower, who resigned his post as state party chair to join Symington's campaign. He also had endorsements from the St. Louis Post-Dispatch and The Kansas City Star. The younger Symington also had the advantage of being mistaken for his father, which at least one poll showed to help him outpoll Republicans such as John Danforth.

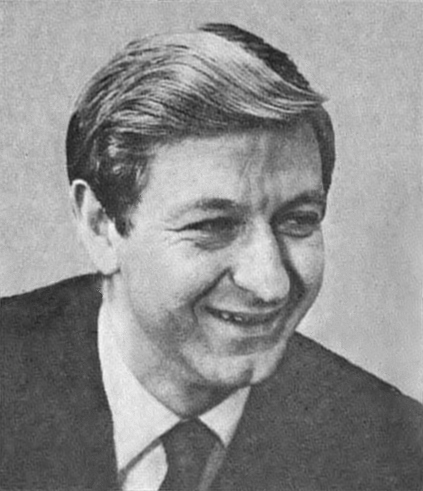
Jerry Litton

The third candidate was 6th District Congressman Jerry Litton from Chillicothe. He had not acquired the same level of name recognition as the other candidates, leaving him to be seen as the third place contender. To make up the difference, he generated attention from his TV program Dialogue with Litton. Furthermore, as a millionaire, he was able to self-fund to outspend his opponents on TV advertisements. As a congressman from the western part of the state, supporters of Litton hoped that Hearnes and Symington would split the St. Louis vote, leaving the rest of the state for Litton. Litton, himself also hoped for this outcome.

A fourth, less major candidate would emerge in Charles Wheeler, the mayor of Kansas City. Wheeler ran to express his opposition to a series of strikes by public employees in Kansas City. He had previously intended a bid for the Vice Presidential nomination, and was not seen as a particularly serious candidate. That said, merely hailing from Western Missouri, it was thought he might have an effect on Litton's vote share, and affect his candidacy, though Litton disagreed with this assertion.

The three leading candidates held few significant differences on the issues, with few exceptions. For example, Hearnes was completely opposed to abortion, whereas Litton supported leaving it up to states and Symington supported it more completely. Litton painted himself as someone who did not go into politics from law school, but owned a business and worked with his hands. Hearnes focused on his conservatism, attacking Congress for its spending habits. Symington focused on his government experience, prior to serving in Congress.

During the race, a Supreme Court ruling was issued lifting spending limits among the candidates and their families. John Danforth asked that the Democrats abide by the old limits. Wheeler agreed, as did Symington who agreed only if Danforth abided by them in a general election. Hearnes agreed to a $35,000 personal limit. Litton refused arguing that spending would be the only way to get his name out to other parts of the state.

=== Results ===
1976 Democratic U.S. Senate primary
Party	Candidate	Votes	%
Democratic	Jerry Litton †	401,822	45.40%
Democratic	Warren Hearnes	233,544	26.38%
Democratic	James Symington	222,681	25.16%
Democratic	Charles Wheeler	10,894	1.23%
Democratic	William McKinley Thomas	4,865	0.55%
Democratic	Lee C. Sutton	4,784	0.54%
Democratic	Norman Tucker	1,923	0.22%
Democratic	Jim Tyler	1,923	0.22%
Democratic	Terry Richards	1,425	0.16%
Democratic	Horace Kingery	1,207	0.14%
Total votes		885,068	100.00%

=== Litton's death and replacement ===
On primary night, Representative Litton and his entire family left from near Chillicothe to Kansas City to attend a party with his supporters. On the plane's take-off, the plane took a nosedive, and the wheel got caught by a barbed wire, causing the plane to catch fire immediately. Litton, his wife Sharon, their two children, their pilot and his son, were all killed, with their bodies hard to identify. The National Transportation Safety Board later found that a broken crankshaft was the cause of a failure in the left engine. Hours later, Litton was announced the winner.

To replace Litton on the general election ticket, the Missouri Democratic State Committee was to hold a meeting to figure out a replacement candidate. Symington immediately took himself out of contention for the seat, out of respect for Litton. Warren Hearnes had many friends on the state's committee and was seen as a favorite, though he was not the preferred choice of many Litton voters. Hearnes faced a challenge from State Treasurer James Spainhower, who did not actively run, but would accept the nomination if drafted. However, Hearnes held too much influence, and won the committee's nomination.

1976 Missouri Democratic State Committee vote
Party	Candidate	Votes	%
Democratic	Warren Hearnes	38	63.33%
Democratic	Jim Spainhower	22	36.67%
Total votes		60	100.00%

== Republican primary ==
=== Candidates ===
- John Danforth, Attorney General of Missouri and nominee for Senate in 1970
- Gregory Hansman, candidate for Lt. governor in 1972 and Senate in 1974

=== Campaign ===
John Danforth had previously been the Republican nominee for Symington's seat in 1970, and came within three points of unseating him. In the years which followed, Danforth was seen as a likely candidate for another bid in 1974 or 1976. After passing on a 1974 bid, Danforth made clear he would either run for Senate in 1976, or retire from politics altogether. Ultimately, Danforth would end up announcing his run, and was the only prominent candidate to run. There was speculation that Governor Kit Bond might have run for the seat, though nothing came of this. Bond ran for re-election, but lost to Joseph Teasdale. Bond would later become a U.S. Senator in 1986.

=== Results ===
1976 Republican U.S. Senate primary
Party	Candidate	Votes	%
Republican	John Danforth	284,025	93.48%
Republican	Gregory Hansman	19,796	6.52%
Total votes		303,821	100.00%

== General election ==
=== Candidates ===
- John Danforth, Attorney General of Missouri and nominee for Senate in 1970 (Republican)
- Warren Hearnes, former governor of Missouri (Democratic)
- Lawrence "Red" Petty, unsuccessful candidate for the American Party nomination for Senate in 1970 (Independent)

=== Campaign ===
Hearnes entered the general election campaign with some key disadvantages. Hearnes was seen as too conservative for the party base, and was also hurt by the federal investigation around him. Hearnes tried to fight the charges, claiming a Republican conspiracy, but he would still be hurt, and many Democrats tried to prevent it from hurting other races on the ballot. Not helping matters, there were few truly appreciable differences between Danforth and Hearnes on many issues, except for the death penalty (Hearnes was for it and Danforth was against it) and the construction of a dam in the Meramac River (Hearnes supported it, Danforth opposed it). Hearnes also had difficulty winning over the support of former Litton backers, some of whom allegedly promised to vote for Danforth.

After releasing a statement critical of Hearnes' nomination, Danforth moved to run a more positive campaign. He focused more on his goals as a Senator rather than attack Hearnes. Danforth was criticized by Hearnes for being the heir of the Ralston-Purina fortune and for "treating politics like a hobby", but Danforth dismissed these claims.

=== Results ===
Danforth won handily, becoming the first Republican U.S. Senator for Missouri since 1946. Hearnes was cleared of any wrongdoing in 1977, but he would never hold elected office again, despite running twice more.

General election results
Party	Candidate	Votes	%	±%
Republican	John Danforth	1,090,067	56.94%	▲8.79
Democratic	Warren E. Hearnes	813,571	42.50%	▼8.54
Independent	Lawrence "Red" Petty	10,822	0.57%	N/A
Turnout		1,914,460	100.00%	
Republican gain from Democratic				

== See also ==
- 1976 United States Senate elections
