= John Danforth =

American politician (born 1936)

The Reverend John Danforth
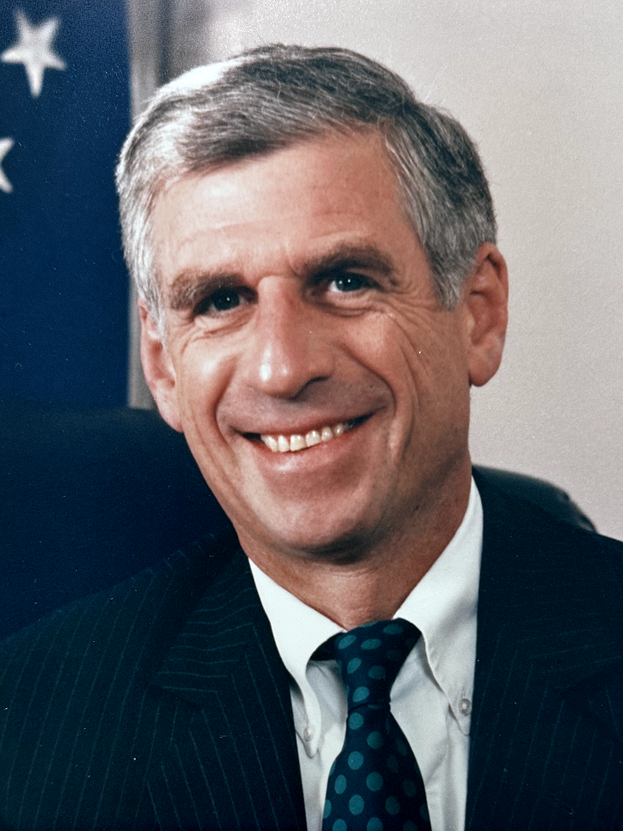

24th United States Ambassador to the United Nations
- In office July 23, 2004 – January 20, 2005
- President: George W. Bush
- Preceded by: John Negroponte
- Succeeded by: Anne Patterson (acting)

Special Counsel for the United States Department of Justice
- In office September 9, 1999 – c. July 23, 2000
- Appointed by: Janet Reno
- Deputy: Edward L. Dowd Jr.
- Preceded by: Position not in use
- Succeeded by: Position not in use

Chair of the Senate Commerce Committee
- In office January 3, 1985 – January 3, 1987
- Preceded by: Bob Packwood
- Succeeded by: Ernest Hollings

United States Senator from Missouri
- In office December 27, 1976 – January 3, 1995
- Preceded by: Stuart Symington
- Succeeded by: John Ashcroft

37th Attorney General of Missouri
- In office January 13, 1969 – December 27, 1976
- Governor: Warren E. Hearnes; Kit Bond
- Preceded by: Norman H. Anderson
- Succeeded by: John Ashcroft

Personal details
- Born: John Claggett Danforth; September 5, 1936 (age 89) St. Louis, Missouri, U.S.
- Party: Republican
- Spouse: Sally Dobson (m. 1957)
- Children: 5
- Relatives: William Danforth (brother); William H. Danforth (grandfather)
- Education: Princeton University (BA); Yale University (JD, MDiv)

John Claggett Danforth (born September 5, 1936) is an American politician, attorney, diplomat, and Episcopal priest who served as the attorney general of Missouri from 1969 to 1976 and as a United States senator from 1976 to 1995. A member of the Republican Party, he later served as special counsel for the U.S. Department of Justice from 1999 to 2000 and as the United States Ambassador to the United Nations from 2004 to 2005.

Born in St. Louis, Missouri, Danforth graduated from Princeton University and Yale University. George H. W. Bush considered selecting him as a vice-presidential running mate in 1988, and Bush's son, George W. Bush, considered doing the same in 2000.

== Early life and education ==
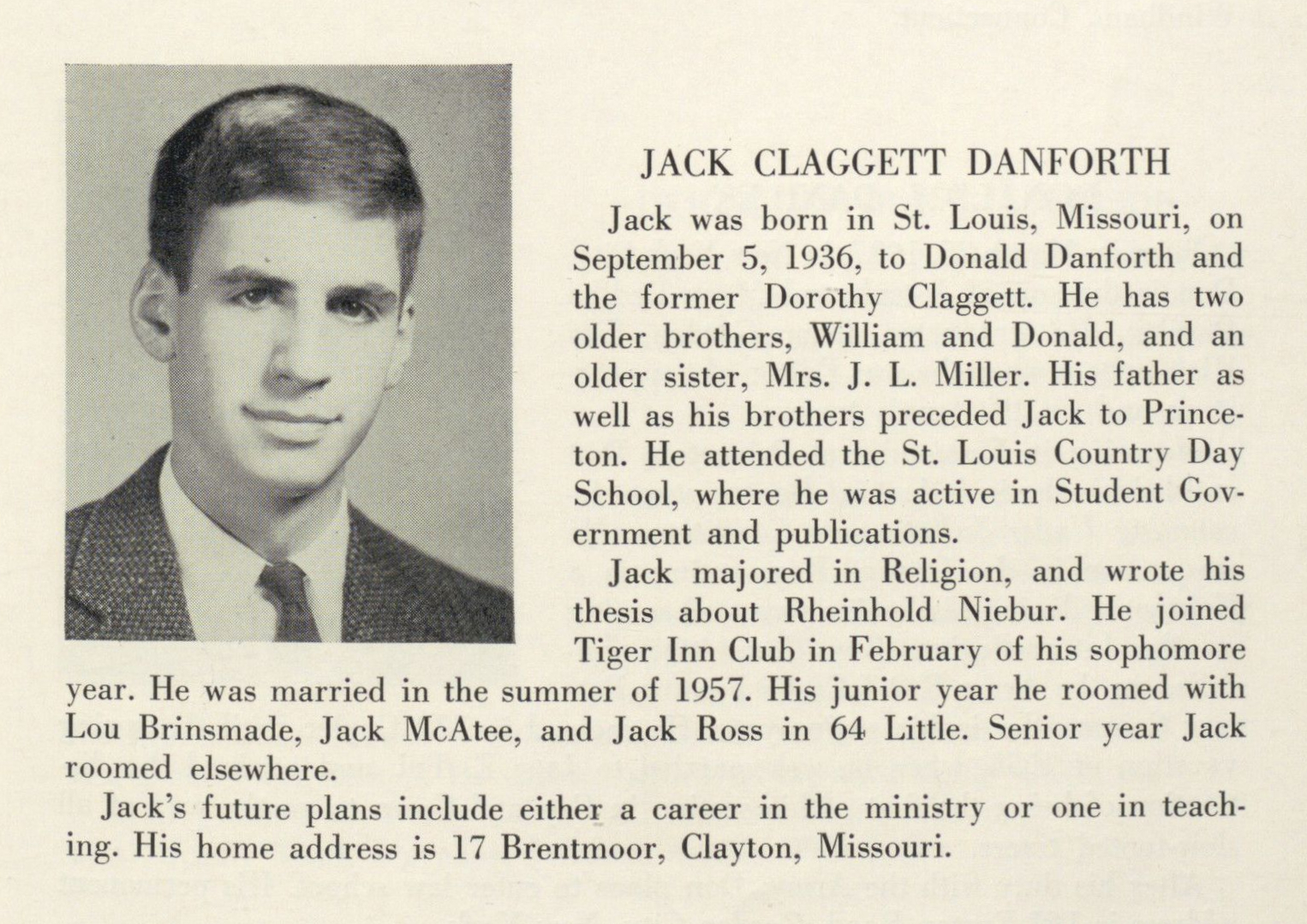
Danforth in the Princeton University yearbook, 1958

Danforth was born in St. Louis, Missouri, the son of Dorothy (Claggett) and Donald Danforth. He is the grandson of William H. Danforth, founder of Ralston Purina. Danforth's brother, William Henry Danforth, was former chancellor of Washington University in St. Louis.

Danforth attended St. Louis Country Day School. He graduated from Princeton University in 1958 with an A.B. in religion after completing his senior thesis, "Christ and Meaning: An Interpretation of Reinhold Niebuhr's Christology." He received degrees from Yale Law School and Yale Divinity School in 1963.

== Career ==
Danforth practiced law at the New York law firm Davis Polk & Wardwell from 1964 to 1966. He was a partner at the law firm of Bryan, Cave, McPheeters and McRoberts in St. Louis from 1966 to 1968.

Before Danforth entered Republican politics, Missouri was a reliably Democratic state with its U.S. senators and governors usually being Democrats. Danforth's seat in the Senate was previously held by a succession of Democrats, including Thomas Hart Benton, Stuart Symington, and Harry S. Truman.

=== Missouri Attorney General ===
In 1968, Danforth was elected Missouri Attorney General, the first Republican elected to the office in 40 years, and the first from his party elected to statewide office in 22 years. Among his staff of assistant attorneys general were future Missouri Governor and U.S. Senator Kit Bond, future Missouri Governor, U.S. Senator and U.S. Attorney General John Ashcroft, future Supreme Court Justice Clarence Thomas, and future federal judge D. Brook Bartlett. Danforth was reelected in 1972.

=== United States Senate ===
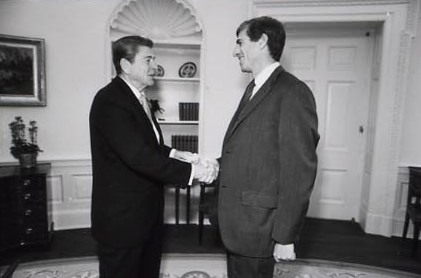
Danforth greeting President Ronald Reagan, 1981

==== Elections ====
In 1970, Danforth ran for the United States Senate for the first time, against Democratic incumbent Stuart Symington. He lost in a close race.

In 1976, Danforth ran to succeed Symington, who was retiring. He had little opposition in the Republican primary. The Democrats had a three-way battle among Symington's son James W. Symington, former Missouri Governor Warren Hearnes, and rising political star Congressman Jerry Litton. Litton won the primary, but he and his family were killed when the plane taking them to their victory party in Kansas City crashed on takeoff in Chillicothe, Missouri. Hearnes, who had finished second in the primary, was chosen to replace Litton as the Democratic nominee. In the general election, Danforth defeated Hearnes with nearly 57% of the vote.

In 1982, the Democratic nominee for U.S. Senate was Harriett Woods, a relatively unknown state senator from the St. Louis suburb of University City. She was active in women's rights organizations and collected union support and was a cousin of Democratic Senator Howard Metzenbaum of Ohio. Her speeches denounced Ronald Reagan's policies so vigorously that she ran on the nickname "Give 'em Hell, Harriett" (a play on the famous Truman phrase). Danforth defeated Woods 51% to 49%, with Woods's pro-choice stance said to be the reason for her loss.

In 1988, Danforth defeated Democrat Jay Nixon, 68%–32%. He chose not to run for a fourth term and retired from the Senate in 1995. He was succeeded by former Missouri governor John Ashcroft. Nixon was later elected Missouri Attorney General, and, in 2008, governor of Missouri.

In January 2001, when Missouri Democrats opposed Ashcroft's nomination for U.S. Attorney General, Danforth's name was invoked. Former U.S. Senator Tom Eagleton reacted to the nomination by saying: "John Danforth would have been my first choice. John Ashcroft would have been my last choice."

==== Tenure ====
During the 1991 Senate confirmation hearings for U.S. Supreme Court nominee Clarence Thomas, Danforth used his clout to support Thomas, who had served Danforth during his state attorney general years and later as an aide in the Senate.

Danforth portrayed himself as a political moderate, but voted like his right-wing Republican colleagues, including sustaining filibusters. He was once quoted as saying he joined the Republican Party for "the same reason you sometimes choose which movie to see—[it's] the one with the shortest line."

Danforth is a longtime opponent of capital punishment, as he made clear on the Senate floor in 1994.

In 1988, George H. W. Bush's presidential campaign vetted Danforth as a potential running mate. Bush selected Indiana Senator Dan Quayle instead.

=== UN Ambassador ===
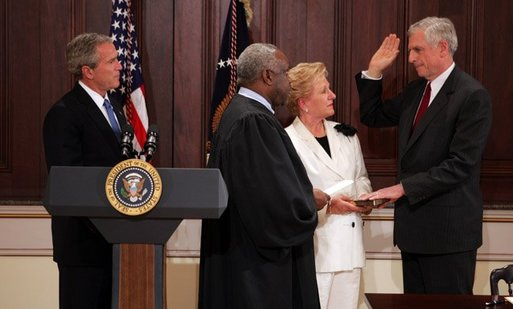
Danforth's swearing in to be the United States Ambassador to the United Nations by Justice Clarence Thomas, his former assistant, 2004

On July 1, 2004, Danforth was sworn in as the United States Ambassador to the United Nations, succeeding John Negroponte, who left the post after becoming the U.S. Ambassador to Iraq in June. He is best remembered for attempts to bring peace to the Sudan but stayed at the UN for just six months. Danforth was mentioned as a successor to Secretary of State Colin Powell. Six days after the announcement that Condoleezza Rice was going to take the position, Danforth submitted his resignation on November 22, 2004, effective January 20, 2005. His resignation letter said, "Forty-seven years ago, I married the girl of my dreams, and, at this point in my life, what is most important to me is to spend more time with her."

== Post-Senate career ==
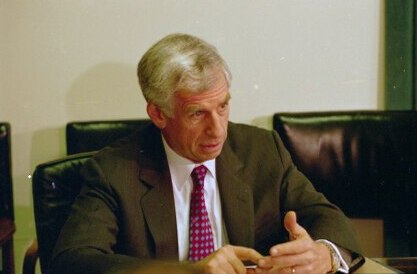
Danforth talks with reporters about his investigation of the 1993 incident involving the FBI and the Branch Davidians in Waco, Texas, 1999

Report to the Deputy Attorney General Concerning the 1993 Confrontation at the Mt. Carmel Complex, Waco, Texas, John Danforth, Independent Counsel, November 8, 2000. Federal government document.

=== Political activity ===
In 1999, Democratic U.S. Attorney General Janet Reno appointed Danforth to lead an investigation into the FBI's role in the 1993 Waco Siege. Danforth appointed Democratic U.S. Attorney Edward L. Dowd Jr. for the Eastern District of Missouri as his deputy special counsel. He also hired Bryan Cave partner Thomas A. Schweich as his chief of staff. Assistant U.S. Attorney James G. Martin served as Danforth's director of investigative operations for what became known as the "Waco Investigation" and its resulting "Danforth Report".

In July 2000, Danforth's name was leaked as being on the short list of potential vice presidential nominees for Republican nominee George W. Bush, along with Michigan Governor John Engler, New York Governor George Pataki, Pennsylvania Governor Tom Ridge, and former U.S. Secretary of Transportation, U.S. Secretary of Labor and former American Red Cross President Elizabeth Dole. One week before the 2000 Republican National Convention was held in Philadelphia, campaign sources said that Dick Cheney, the man charged with leading the selection process for the nominee, had recommended Danforth. But Danforth wanted to continue living mainly in Missouri, where his family was still based, and formally declined to run for vice president on July 11, 2000. Bush ultimately selected Cheney himself. Bush wrote in his book Decision Points that Danforth would have been his choice if Cheney had not accepted; on July 28, 2000, The New York Times reported that the choice of Cheney as Bush's running mate was secretly made "weeks" before it was formally announced on July 25. On September 6, 2001, Bush appointed Danforth a special envoy to Sudan. He brokered a peace deal that officially ended the civil war in the South between Sudan's Islamic government and the U.S.-backed Christian rebels, but elements of that conflict still remained unresolved (as had the separate Darfur conflict). Known as the Second Sudanese Civil War, the conflict ended in January 2005 with the signing of a peace agreement.

On June 11, 2004, Danforth presided over the funeral of Ronald Reagan, held at Washington National Cathedral. Danforth also officiated at the funerals of Washington Post executive Katharine Graham, former United States Senator Harry Flood Byrd Jr. of Virginia, and Missouri State Auditor Tom Schweich.

On March 30, 2005, Danforth wrote an op-ed in The New York Times critical of the Republican party. The article began: "By a series of recent initiatives, Republicans have transformed our party into the political arm of conservative Christians". He also penned a June 17, 2005, piece headlined "Onward, Moderate Christian Soldiers". At a Log Cabin Republicans meeting on April 30, 2006, Danford publicly expressed opposition to the proposed Federal Marriage Amendment, which would have banned same sex marriages, calling it "silly" and comparing it to Prohibition. In 2015, Danforth and 299 other Republicans signed an amicus brief calling on the Supreme Court to legalize same-sex marriage.

Contributing to the anthology Our American Story (2019), Danforth addressed the possibility of a shared American narrative and focused on the "great American purpose" of "hold[ing] together in one nation a diverse and often contentious people." He encouraged continued work "to demand a functioning government where compromise is the norm, to integrate all our people into one indivisible nation, and to incorporate separated individuals into the wholeness of the community." Danforth is a member of the Reformers Caucus of Issue One.

Danforth was a mentor and political supporter of Josh Hawley, who became Attorney General of Missouri in 2017 and U.S. Senator in 2019 with Danforth's encouragement; Danforth also supported Hawley's presidential ambitions. In the wake of the January 6 United States Capitol attack and Hawley's efforts to challenge the 2021 United States Electoral College vote count, Danforth said that supporting Hawley in the 2018 election "was the worst mistake I ever made in my life". During the 2022 United States Senate election in Missouri, Danforth headed a PAC supporting independent candidate John Wood, considered a long shot to win. Wood collected enough signatures to get on the ballot but dropped out after 50 days when Eric Schmitt won the Republican primary. Danforth spent $6 million on the effort.

=== Private sector ===
In 1995, following his departure from the Senate, Danforth again became a partner at the Bryan Cave law firm. As of 2021 Danforth is a partner at Dowd Bennett, a Clayton law firm just outside Saint Louis.

In May 2012, a group led by Danforth's son-in-law, Summitt Distributing CEO Tom Stillman, in which Danforth is a minority investor, took controlling ownership of the St. Louis Blues of the National Hockey League. The group acquired full ownership of the team in June 2019. Danforth has a star on the St. Louis Walk of Fame. He is an honorary board member of the humanitarian organization Wings of Hope.

== Personal life ==
Danforth married the former Sally Dobson in 1957. They have five children and 15 grandchildren.

== Author ==
- Resurrection: The Confirmation of Clarence Thomas, Viking, 1994
- Faith and Politics: How the "Moral Values" Debate Divides America and How to Move Forward Together, Viking Press, 2006. ISBN 978-0670037872
- The Relevance of Religion: How Faithful People Can Change Politics. Description & preview. Random House, 2015. ISBN 978-0812997903

== See also ==
- George H. W. Bush Supreme Court candidates
- List of attorneys general of Missouri

Party political offices
Preceded by Daniel Bartlett	Republican nominee for Attorney General of Missouri; 1968, 1972	Succeeded by John Ashcroft
Preceded by Jean Bradshaw	Republican nominee for U.S. Senator from Missouri (Class 1); 1970, 1976, 1982, 1988	Succeeded by John Ashcroft
Legal offices
Preceded by Norman Anderson	Attorney General of Missouri; 1969–1976	Succeeded by John Ashcroft
U.S. Senate
Preceded by Stuart Symington	United States Senator (Class 1) from Missouri; 1976–1995; Served alongside: Thomas Eagleton, Kit Bond	Succeeded by John Ashcroft
Preceded by Bob Packwood	Chair of the Senate Commerce Committee; 1985–1987	Succeeded by Ernest Hollings
Preceded by Ernest Hollings	Ranking Member of the Senate Commerce Committee; 1987–1995	Succeeded by Ernest Hollings
Diplomatic posts
Preceded by John Negroponte	United States Ambassador to the United Nations; 2004–2005	Succeeded by Anne Patterson; Acting
U.S. order of precedence (ceremonial)
Preceded by Olympia Snowe as Former U.S. Senator	Order of precedence of the United States as Former U.S. Senator	Succeeded by Bill Nelson as Former U.S. Senator
