= Norman H. Anderson (politician) =

American attorney and politician (1924–1997)

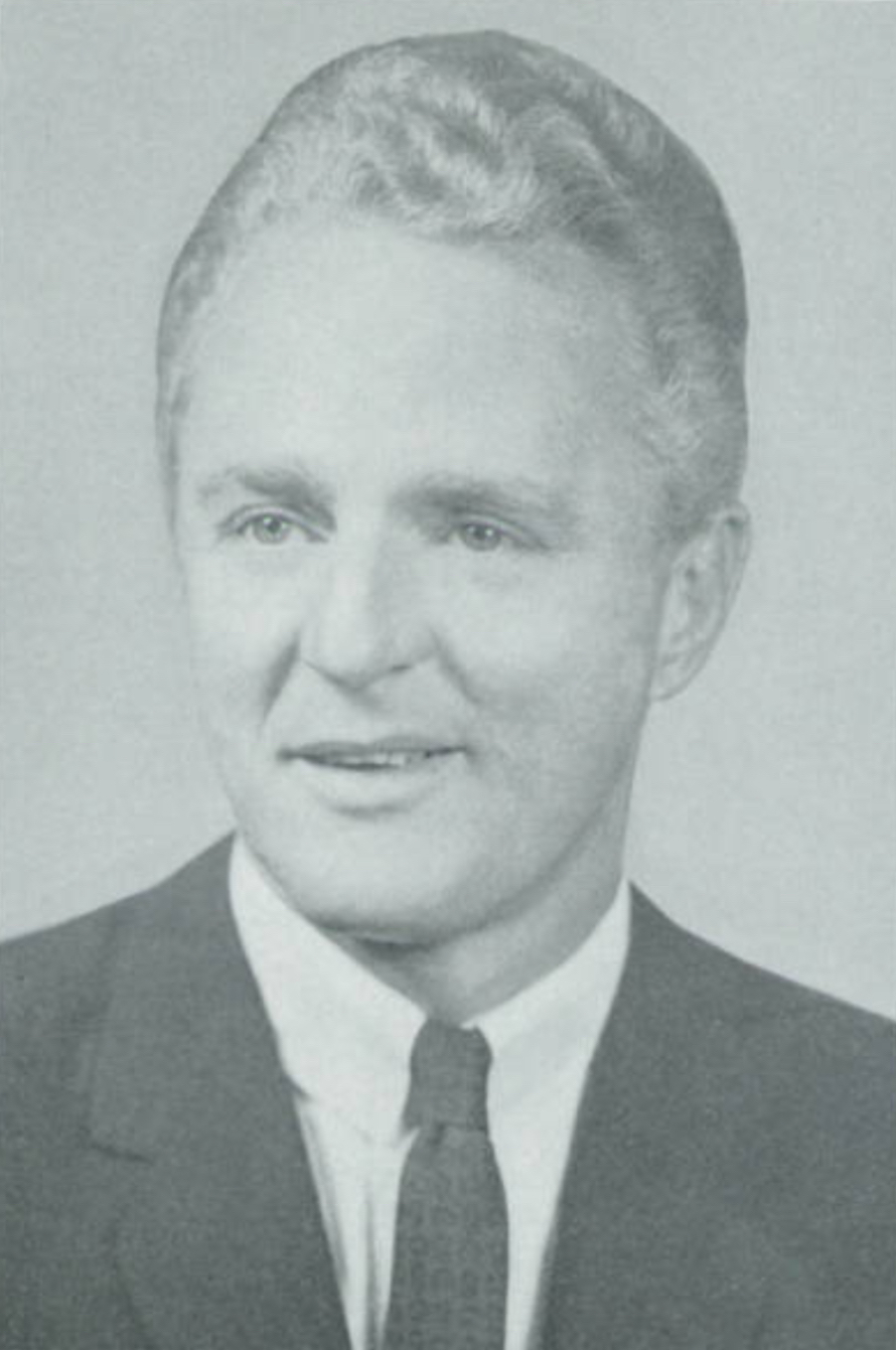
- Anderson in 1965

36th Attorney General of Missouri
- In office 1965–1969
- Governor: Warren E. Hearnes
- Preceded by: Thomas Eagleton
- Succeeded by: John Danforth

Personal details
- Born: March 2, 1924 St. Louis County, Missouri, U.S.
- Died: June 16, 1997 (aged 73)
- Party: Democratic

Norman H. Anderson (March 2, 1924 – June 16, 1997) was an American attorney and politician. He served as attorney general of Missouri from 1965 to 1969.

== Life and career ==
Anderson was born in St. Louis County, Missouri. He was a St. Louis County prosecuting attorney and magistrate judge.

Anderson served as attorney general of Missouri from 1965 to 1969.

Anderson died on June 16, 1997 of lung cancer, at the age of 73.
