= James Antonio =

American politician (born 1939)

32nd Auditor of Missouri
- In office 1978 – July 16, 1984
- Governor: Joseph P. Teasdale; Kit Bond
- Preceded by: Thomas M. Keyes
- Succeeded by: Margaret B. Kelly

Personal details
- Born: June 30, 1939 (age 86)
- Party: Republican

James F. Antonio (born June 30, 1939) served as state auditor of the U.S. state of Missouri. A Republican from Cole County, he served from 1978 until his resignation in mid-1984.

Party political offices
| Preceded by John Ashcroft | Republican nominee for State Auditor of Missouri; 1978, 1982 | Succeeded by Margaret B. Kelly |
Political offices
| Preceded by Thomas M. Keyes | State Auditor of Missouri; 1978–1984 | Succeeded by Margaret B. Kelly |
