= Warren E. Hearnes =

American politician (1923–2009)

Warren Hearnes
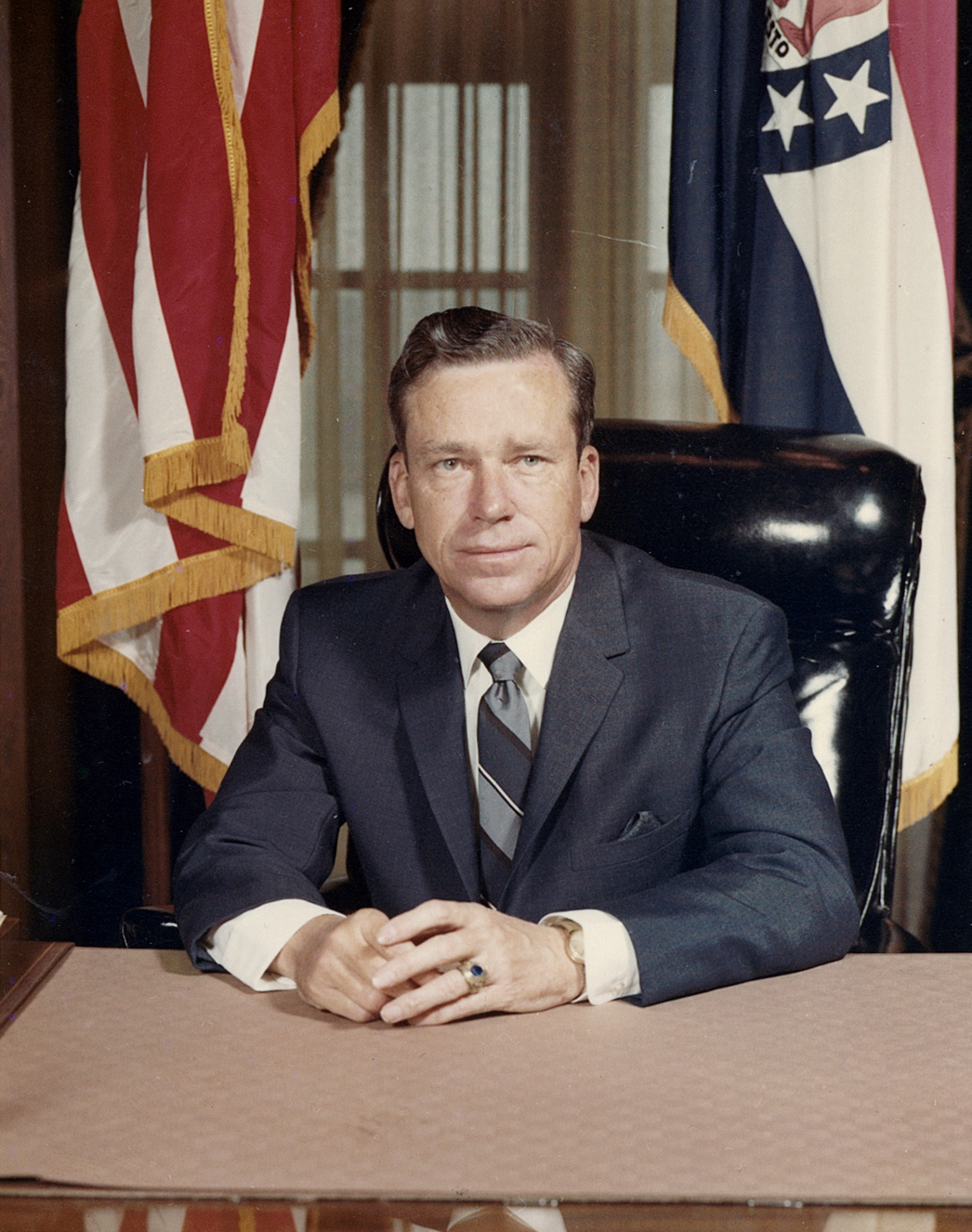
- Hearnes in 1967

46th Governor of Missouri
- In office January 11, 1965 – January 8, 1973
- Lieutenant: Thomas Eagleton; William S. Morris
- Preceded by: John M. Dalton
- Succeeded by: Kit Bond

Chair of the National Governors Association
- In office August 9, 1970 – September 12, 1971
- Preceded by: John Arthur Love
- Succeeded by: Arch A. Moore Jr.

31st Secretary of State of Missouri
- In office January 9, 1961 – January 11, 1965
- Governor: John M. Dalton
- Preceded by: Robert Crawford
- Succeeded by: James Kirkpatrick

Member of the Missouri House of Representatives from the Mississippi County district
- In office January 3, 1951 – January 4, 1961
- Preceded by: Kelly Jackson
- Succeeded by: David Rolwing

Judge of the Missouri Circuit Court for the 33rd circuit
- In office 1980

Personal details
- Born: Warren Eastman Hearnes; July 24, 1923 Moline, Illinois, U.S.
- Died: August 16, 2009 (aged 86) Charleston, Missouri, U.S.
- Party: Democratic
- Spouse: Betty Cooper
- Education: United States Military Academy (BS); University of Missouri (LLB)

Military service
- Allegiance: United States
- Branch/service: United States Army
- Years of service: 1941–1949
- Battles/wars: World War II

Warren Eastman Hearnes (July 24, 1923 – August 16, 2009) was an American politician who served as the 46th governor of Missouri from 1965 to 1973. A member of the Democratic Party, he was the first officeholder eligible to serve two consecutive four-year terms as Governor. He previously served as the Secretary of State of Missouri from 1961 to 1965.

After leaving office Hearnes was dogged by a tax investigation, relating to finances in and out of his administration. While later cleared of any wrongdoing, Hearnes faced trouble in future bids for office. He was the Democratic nominee for U.S. Senate in 1976, replacing Jerry Litton who died after winning the nomination, but lost to John Danforth in November. He subsequently lost bids for Missouri Auditor in 1978, and a Circuit Court Judge position in 1980.

Hearnes was the last Democrat to serve two full terms as Governor until Jay Nixon, who served as Governor from 2009 to 2017.

== Early life ==
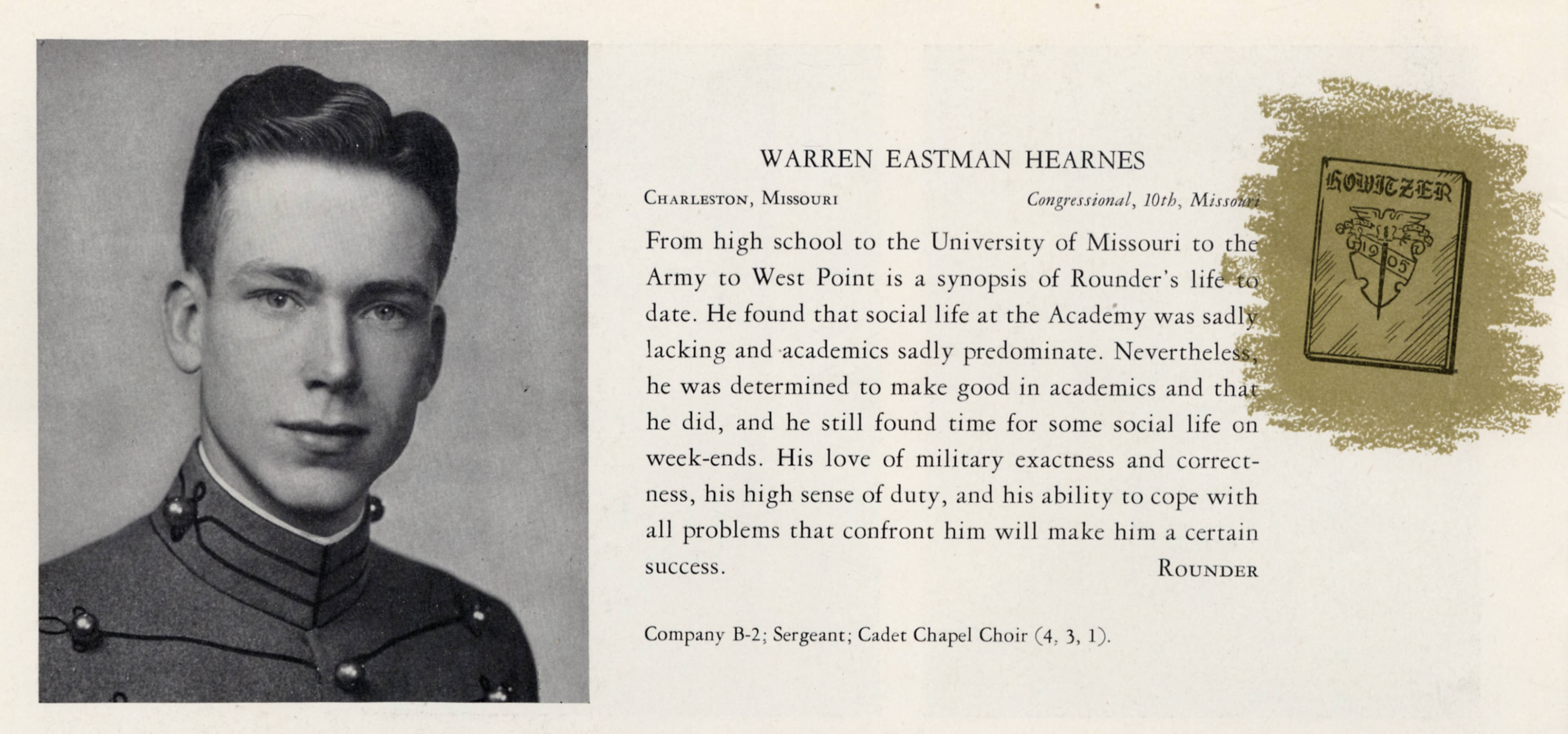
Hearnesin the United States Military Academy yearbook, 1946

Born in Moline, Illinois, Hearnes moved to Charleston, Missouri, as a child and resided there until his death. After high school, he attended the University of Missouri for a year and a half, until he was drafted. Soon after reporting for duty, Hearnes was appointed by President Roosevelt to the United States Military Academy at West Point, Class of 1946. He married Betty Cooper (born July 24, 1927), his childhood sweetheart, on July 2, 1948. He served in the U.S. Army and was medically discharged in 1949 after he broke his ankle in a softball game. He was a 1952 graduate of the University of Missouri School of Law.

== Political career ==
While attending law school, he was elected to the Missouri House of Representatives in 1950 and served until 1961. He served as majority floor leader from 1957 until leaving office.

In 1960, he ran for secretary of state of Missouri. In the primary, he defeated James Kirkpatrick, garnering 42.15% of the vote. He defeated Joseph Badgett in the general election with 56.18% of the vote.

=== Governor of Missouri ===
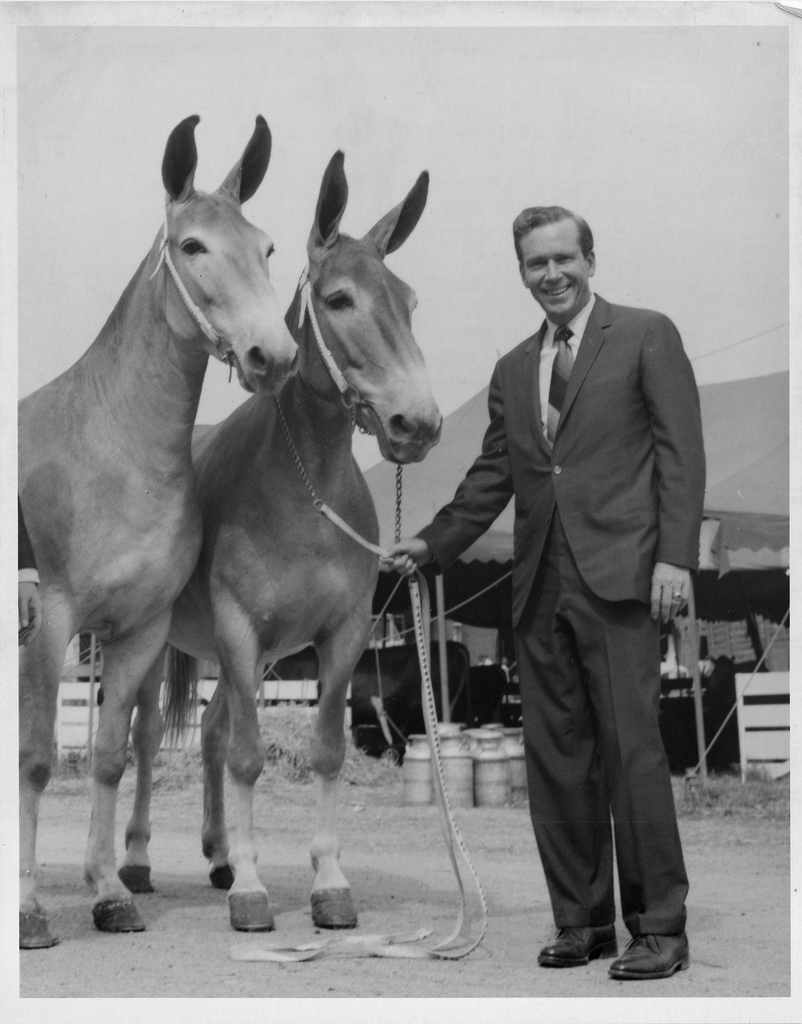
Hearnes inspecting champion mules at the 1969 Missouri State Fair

In 1964, Hearnes challenged the remnants of the Tom Pendergast political machine in the race for governor. During the primary he campaigned against Kansas City establishment candidate Hilary A. Bush charging, "At one time all Missouri was controlled from Kansas City by a man named Pendergast. This type of machine politics should never be allowed to rear its ugly head again in Missouri politics." Among Hearnes' plans was an effort to gain support in western Missouri by the establishment of a four-year college (Missouri Western State University) in the population center of St. Joseph, Missouri despite the presence of a state college (Northwest Missouri State University) less than 50 miles away in the much smaller city of Maryville, Missouri.

Hearnes also campaigned against the Central Trust Bank of Jefferson City, Missouri (which, since its 1902 founding by Lon Stephens, had been the central depository for state funds), saying that the bank's power was creating an atmosphere where establishment forces would "select rather than elect" a leader.

Hearnes won the primary over Bush with 51.9% of the vote. In the general election he won by more than 500,000 votes and 62% of the vote, defeating Republican Ethan A.H. Shepley, chancellor of Washington University in St. Louis. His lieutenant governor in the race was Thomas Eagleton. In 1965 the constitution was amended to permit governors to serve two consecutive terms.

Hearnes considered running as a favorite son candidate in the 1968 Democratic Party presidential primaries, but ultimately withdrew his candidacy. He chaired the Missouri delegation to the 1968 Democratic National Convention, which was selected by a traditional caucus of party members and overwhelmingly supported the candidacy of Hubert Humphrey. At the convention, he spoke in support of President Lyndon B. Johnson's Vietnam policy. Despite this, Hearnes voted to pass a minority report from the convention's Rules Committee which ultimately established the McGovern-Fraser Commission, which would substantially democratize the Democratic primaries. Historians of the primary process have disputed whether Hearnes was confused when he made his vote, or whether he had been convinced by the arguments that a more open primary process was preferable. Hearnes' vote was instrumental to the passage of the minority report, as the entire Missouri delegation followed his lead; this supplied the report with its margin of victory.

Hearnes was re-elected in 1968. He defeated Lawrence K. Roos, former St. Louis County Executive and former president of the St. Louis Federal Reserve Bank. He had 60.8% of the vote.

Hearnes' priorities as Governor included improving public education, bettering the state's highways and traffic safety, as well as civil rights and the environment. State aid to public schools increased from $145.5 million to $389.2 million during Hearnes' term as governor, an increase of 167%, and he also increased state aid to higher education from $47.5 million to $144.7 million, an increase of 204%.

He oversaw the increase of state aid to vocational education from $856,000 to $8.8 million, fostering the establishment 53 new area vocational educational schools. While Hearnes was Governor, the State of Missouri built 350 miles of four-lane highways throughout the state. He also created the Missouri Division of Highway Safety and enacted a law providing mandatory breath tests for suspected drunken drivers. Hearnes increased uniform strength of the Missouri State Highway Patrol from 500 to 750 officers.

Hearnes was Governor during the Civil Rights era and as Governor he signed a Public Accommodations Law, Missouri's first civil rights act. As governor he also strengthened the Fair Employment Practices Act and increased the staff of the Human Rights Commission from two employees to 35. Hearnes also enacted the state's first air pollution law, with subsequent strengthening of its provisions. He oversaw the passage of a $150 million water pollution bond issue to provide state matching funds for sewage control construction projects, and created the state's Clean Water Commission to enforce water pollution laws. He also was responsible for the provision of first state financial grants for mass transit and urban rapid transit facilities. He created the Department of Community Affairs to assist local governments in obtaining technical assistance and grants for city planning, zoning, housing, sewage treatment, industrial development, and other municipal and regional projects.

In 1970, he was elected chairman of the National Governors Association which held its annual conference at Lake of the Ozarks. In the 1972 Democratic Party presidential primaries, he supported Edmund Muskie for president and was considered a possible running mate, had Muskie won the nomination.

== Post-gubernatorial career ==
After leaving office Hearnes was plagued with tax problems which were ultimately cleared in 1977. His problems were highlighted by an exposé in the St. Louis Post-Dispatch. Hearnes sued the paper for defamation and the case was ultimately settled with terms undisclosed.

After facing public pressure to appoint a special counsel during the Watergate scandal, President Richard Nixon considered either Hearnes or Pat Brown for the role. Attorney General Elliot Richardson rejected both options, and ultimately appointed Archibald Cox.

Hearnes ran for United States Senate in 1976. He placed second in the primary with 26.9 percent of the vote. The winner, Jerry Litton, had 45.4%, but was killed in a plane crash en route to a primary election victory party on August 3. On August 21, the Democratic state committee selected Hearnes as the replacement nominee over Jim Spainhower by a 38 to 22 vote. Hearnes lost the general election to John Danforth who garnered 56.9% of the vote.

In 1978 he ran unsuccessfully for Missouri state auditor, losing the general election to Republican James F. Antonio, who received 50.8% of the vote. His wife, Betty Cooper Hearnes, began her own political career as a state representative in 1979, serving until 1988. She also was the 1988 Democratic nominee for governor.

In 1980, Hearnes was appointed Circuit Court Judge, making him the first person in Missouri history to serve in all three branches of the state government. However he failed to be elected to the position in the same year.

== Legacy ==
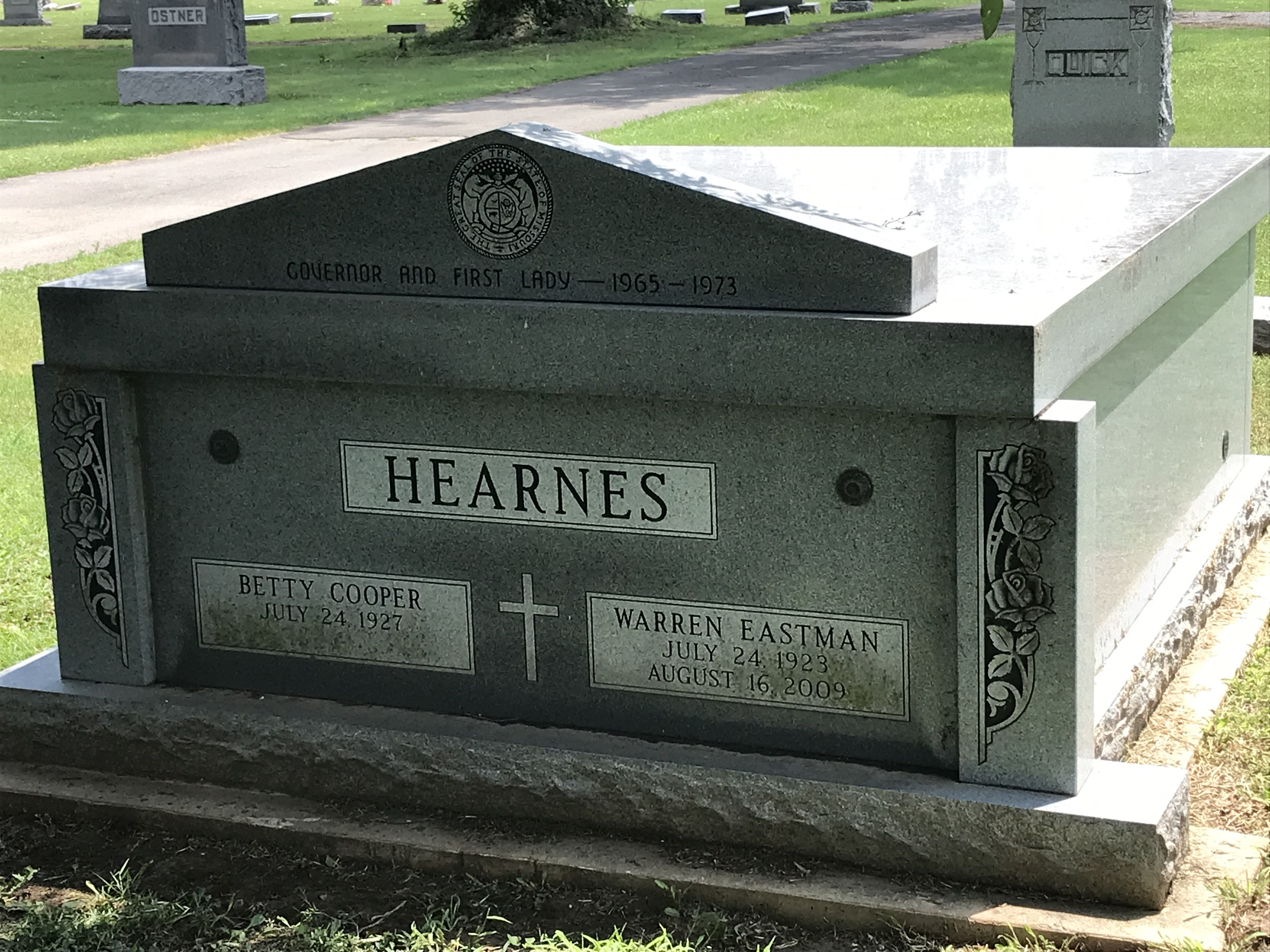
The Hearnes grave in Charleston, Missouri

In 1972, the Hearnes Center on the University of Missouri campus in Columbia, Missouri, was named in honor of the outgoing governor.

In 2005, Warren and Betty Hearnes were awarded the Edwin P. Hubble Medal of Initiative during the Charleston Dogwood-Azalea Festival. The medal was presented by a delegation of citizens from Marshfield, Missouri. The medal is the city of Marshfield's highest honor and is named for a native son.

In the 2008 Democratic Party presidential primaries Hearnes endorsed the campaign of Hillary Clinton for the Democratic presidential nomination.

In 2010, a bust of Hearnes sculpted by Sabra Tull Meyer was dedicated outside the Mississippi County Courthouse in Charleston, Missouri. Later that year he was also inducted into the Hall of Famous Missourians; his bronze bust is displayed in the state capitol.

In December 2016, Highway 249 near Missouri Southern State University between the I-44 and 49 interchange and East Zora became known as the Governor Warren E. Hearnes Memorial Highway.

== Death ==
Hearnes died August 16, 2009. He is buried in IOOF Cemetery in Charleston, Missouri, along with his wife who died in 2023. He is also buried with his daughter, Lynn Cooper Hearnes, who was killed in an auto accident on December 31, 2009, only a few months after the death of her father.

Party political offices
Preceded by Robert W. Crawford	Democratic nominee for Secretary of State of Missouri; 1960	Succeeded by James C. Kirkpatrick
Preceded by John M. Dalton	Democratic nominee for Governor of Missouri; 1964, 1968	Succeeded by Edward L. Dowd
Preceded by Jerry Litton	Democratic nominee for U.S. Senator from Missouri (Class 1); 1976	Succeeded by Harriett Woods
Preceded by George W. Lehr	Democratic nominee for Auditor of Missouri; 1978	Succeeded by James R. Butler
Political offices
Preceded by Robert W. Crawford	Secretary of State of Missouri; January 9, 1961 – January 11, 1965	Succeeded by James C. Kirkpatrick
Preceded by John M. Dalton	Governor of Missouri; January 11, 1965 – January 8, 1973	Succeeded by Kit Bond
Preceded by John Arthur Love	Chair of the National Governors Association; August 9, 1970 – September 12, 1971	Succeeded by Arch A. Moore Jr.
