= James Kirkpatrick (politician) =

American politician (1905–1997)

James C. Kirkpatrick
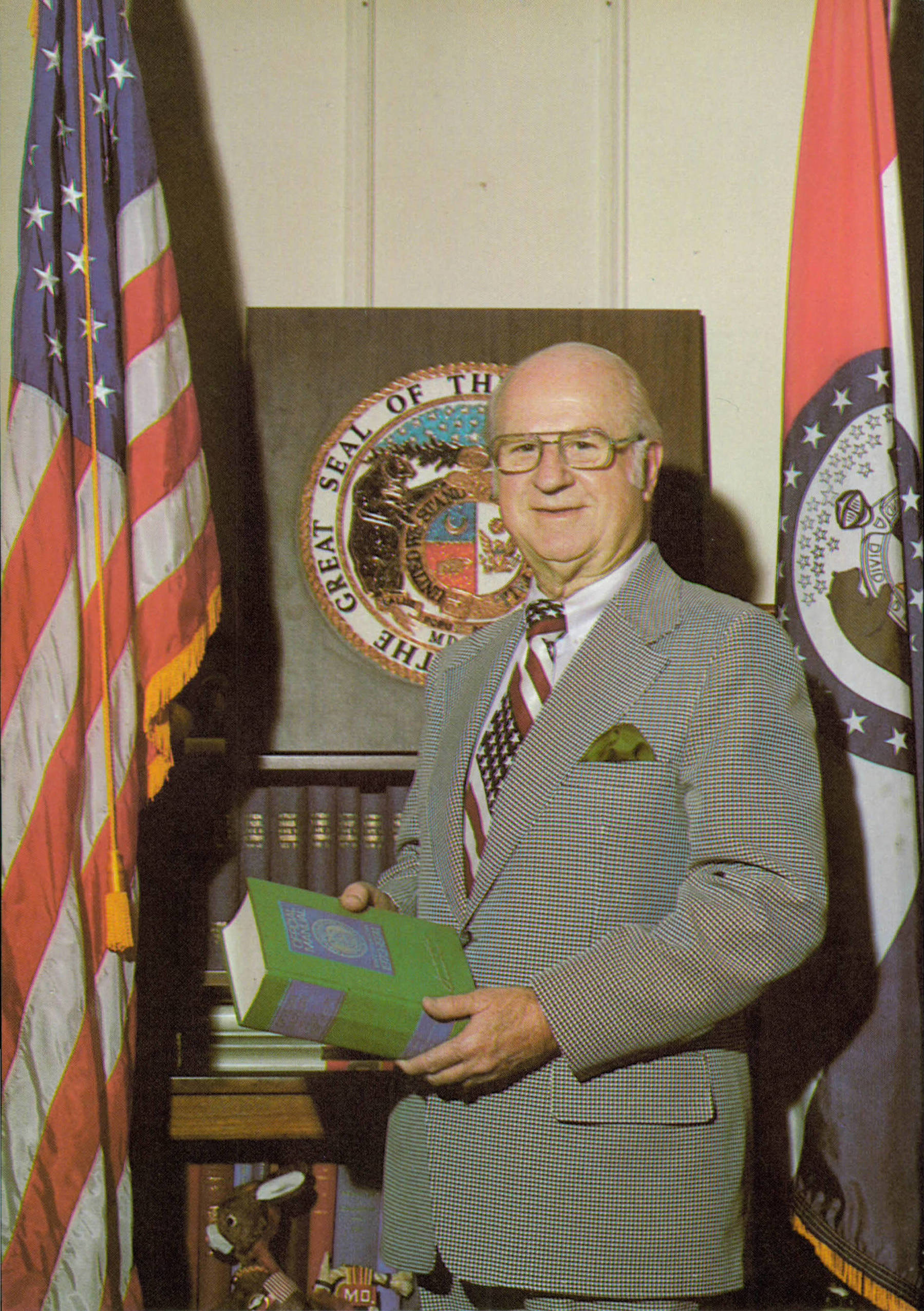

32nd Secretary of State of Missouri
- In office January 11, 1965 – January 8, 1985
- Governor: Warren Hearnes; Kit Bond; Joseph Teasdale; Kit Bond
- Preceded by: Warren Hearnes
- Succeeded by: Roy Blunt

Personal details
- Born: June 15, 1905 Braymer, Missouri, U.S.
- Died: December 26, 1997 (aged 92) Warrensburg, Missouri, U.S.
- Party: Democratic
- Spouse(s): Jessamine Young; Doris Houx
- Education: Central Missouri State College

James C. Kirkpatrick (June 15, 1905 – December 26, 1997) was an American politician from Missouri, United States.

== Early life ==
He was born in Braymer, Missouri, graduated from Northeast High School in Kansas City, Missouri and Central Missouri State University in Warrensburg, Missouri. He was a member of Sigma Tau Gamma fraternity. He started his newspaper career at The Daily Star-Journal in Warrensburg and rose to be its editor. He went on to be editor of the Jefferson City News-Tribune. He purchased weekly newspapers Windsor, Missouri Review and then the Lamar, Missouri Democrat. Governor Forrest Smith asked him to write speeches for him. In 1960 he was defeated by Warren Hearnes in his first bid for Missouri Secretary of State. He won his first term in 1964.

== Career ==
A member of the Democratic Party, he served as the Missouri Secretary of State from 1965 to 1985, establishing the current Missouri record for tenure of an elected state constitutional officer.

Kirkpatrick was a publisher by trade; the Northwest Missouri Press Association gives an annual award bearing his name.

== Legacy ==
Numerous public facilities in Missouri have been named in Kirkpatrick's honor. Senate Concurrent Resolution 36, passed in 1998, renamed Missouri's State Information Center the James C. Kirkpatrick Information Center. The main library at the University of Central Missouri in Warrensburg, Missouri, is named the James C. Kirkpatrick Library. A replica of his capital office, located previously in the former Ward Edwards Library, can be found on the second floor, and a collection of his public and private papers is held in their Special Collections.

The Student Government Association at the University of Central Missouri has established the "James C. Kirkpatrick Excellence in Governance Award" for outstanding public service and the promotion of higher education in Missouri. This acknowledgment of service is awarded every spring for the past 23 years in the James C. Kirkpatrick Library around St. Patrick's Day in honor of Kirkpatrick's heritage.

Past recipients include:

- Governor Matt Blunt,
- Deleta Williams, State Representative and former UCM Board of Governors member,
- Senator Claire McCaskill,
- Governor Jay Nixon,
- Robin Carnahan, Missouri Secretary of State,
- David Pearce, State Representative,
- Paul LeVota, House Democratic Leader.

Party political offices
Preceded by Warren E. Hearnes	Democratic nominee for Secretary of State of Missouri; 1964, 1968, 1972, 1976, 1980	Succeeded by Gary D. Sharpe
Political offices
Preceded by Warren E. Hearnes	Missouri Secretary of State; 1965–1985	Succeeded by Roy Blunt
