= Harold Hamilton =

Harold Hamilton may refer to:

- Harold Hamilton (1885–1937), biologist on the Australasian Antarctic expedition of 1911–1914
- Harold P. Hamilton (1924–2003), American soldier, college president, professor, state government official and charity administrator.
