= Central Methodist University =

Private university in Fayette, Missouri, US

- Former names: Central College (1854–1961); Central Methodist College (1961–2004)
- Type: Private
- Established: 1854
- Religious affiliation: United Methodist Church
- Academic affiliations: CIC; IAMSCU; NAICU
- Endowment: $66.6 million (2024)
- President: Roger Drake
- Students: 3,382
- Undergraduates: 5,437 (total); 1,185 (main campus); 4,252 (off-campus extended studies)
- Postgraduates: 225
- Location: Fayette, Missouri, United States; 39°09′01″N 92°41′07″W
- Campus: Rural, 55 acres (22.3 ha)
- Colors: Green & White
- Nickname: Eagles
- Sporting affiliations: NAIA – HAAC
- Website: www.centralmethodist.edu

Central Methodist University (formerly known as Central Methodist College and Central College, as well as by its abbreviation CMU) is a private university in Fayette, Missouri. CMU is accredited to offer master's, bachelors, and associate degrees. While affiliated with the United Methodist Church, the university does not impose any religious requirements on its students.

== History ==
On April 13–14, 1853, Central Methodist University was founded by Nathan Scarritt and David Rice McAnally. The Methodist Episcopal Church, South received the campus of the defunct Howard College in 1847. Initially founded as Howard High School, the Howard Female College and Central College were subsequently formed. The college was chartered by the Missouri General Assembly on March 15, 1855. It came about due largely to the diligent work of Nathan Scarritt and David Rice McAnally. Classes began on September 18, 1857, on a 1-acre (0.405 ha) campus with an enrollment of 114 students and a faculty of three. Samuel C. Major was the first graduate, in 1858. In about 100 years the school grew to a campus of 55 acres (22.3 ha), enrollment of over 1,000 students and a faculty of 65. In 2004, it was granted university status and changed its name accordingly.

=== 1864 Battle of Fayette ===
The battle occurred on September 24, 1864, when two bands of Southern sympathizers attacked the Union troops stationed in Fayette; it ranged across the town to end on what is now the college's campus. The guerrillas were led by William "Bloody Bill" Anderson and George Todd, and included among their number were Frank and Jesse James, of outlaw fame. Somewhere between 30 and 50 Union soldiers faced off against the 250 guerrillas, who had disguised themselves with uniforms taken from dead Union soldiers.

Only 75 members of the large guerrilla party charged the barricaded troops. Though Anderson and Todd lived on to terrorize Union troops across the state before their deaths, the ill-conceived attack had deadly consequences: after three charges, thirteen of Anderson's men were dead and another 30 were wounded. Only 1 (some accounts say 3) of the Union soldiers were killed, and another five wounded.

In later years, Frank James said that the Fayette fight made him "the worst scared I ever was during the war." In his brief description of the fight, he said, "We charged up to a blockhouse made of railroad ties filled with portholes and then charged back again. The blockhouse was filled with Federal troops and it was like charging a stone wall, only this stone wall belched forth lead."

On October 14, 2007, the Missouri Department of Natural Resources commemorated the battle by placing a marker on the Central Methodist University campus.

=== Presidents ===
	President	Term	Description
1	Rev. Nathan Scarritt, D.D.	June 1857 – June 1858	Nathan Scarritt was born on April 15, 1788, in Connecticut. He died in 1890 in Missouri.
2	Rev. A. A. Morrison, D.D.	June 1858 – March 1860	Resigned from office under duress.
3	Rev. C. W. Pritchett, LL.D., pro tem	March 1860 – June 1860	
4	Rev. W. A. Anderson, D.D.	June 1860 – June 1861	Closed the college down due to the Civil War. The college was inoperative from June 1861 to June 1868 because of the Civil War.
5	Rev. W. A. Smith, D.D.	June 1868 – April 1870	Died while serving as president of the college.
6	Prof. F. X. Forster, M.A., pro tem	April 1870 – August 1870	
7	Rev. J. C. Wills, D.D.	August 1870 — February 1878	Died while serving as president of the college. Vacant February 1878 - April 1878 due to the death of President Wills.
8	Rev. E. R. Hendrix, D.D., LL.D.	April 1878 – June 1886	His election to Bishop in the Methodist Church forced him to resign from the president's office.
9	O. H. P. Corprew, A.M., pro tem	June 1886 – June 1888	
10	Rev. J. D. Hammond, D.D.	June 1888 – June 1896	
11	Tyson S. Dines, A.M.	June 1896 – June 1897	After an accident left him crippled for life, he resigned from office.
12	E. B. Craighead, A.M., LL.D.	June 1897 – June 1901	
13	T. Berry Smith, A.M., LL.D., acting	June 1901 – June 1903	
14	Rev. James C. Morris, D.D.	June 1903 – June 1907	He took a leave of absence and never returned.
15	William A. Webb, A.B., Litt. D.	June 1907 – July 1913	
16	Rev. Paul H. Linn, A.M., LL.B., D.D.	July 1913 – February 1924	Died while serving as president of the college.
17	E. P. Puckett, A.M., LL.D., pro tem	February 1924 – July 1924	
18	Bishop W. F. McMurry, D.D., LL.D.	July 1924 – September 1930	
19	Robert H. Ruff, A.M., B.D., D.D., LL.D.	September 1930 – May 1942	Died while serving as president of the college.
20	Rev. Harry S. DeVore, B.D., D.D.	June 1942 – October 1947	Was relinquished by the board of trustees, and then died soon after.
21	E. P. Puckett, A.M., LL.D., acting	November 1947 – May 1950	
22	Rev. Ralph L. Woodward, A.M., B.D., D.D., L.H.D.	June 1950 – August 1970	
23	Rev. Harold P. Hamilton, B.A., B.D., Ph.D., L.H.D	August 1970 – August 1976	
24	Thomas R. Feld, Ph.D., acting	August 1976 – August 1977	
25	Joe A. Howell, Ed. D	August 1977 – July 1995	
26	Marianne E. Inman, B.A., A.M., Ph.D	July 1995 – June 2013	
27	Roger Drake, B.B.A., M.B.A., Ed.D	July 2013 – Present	

== Campus ==
- Central Methodist College Campus Historic District
- U.S. National Register of Historic Places
- U.S. Historic district
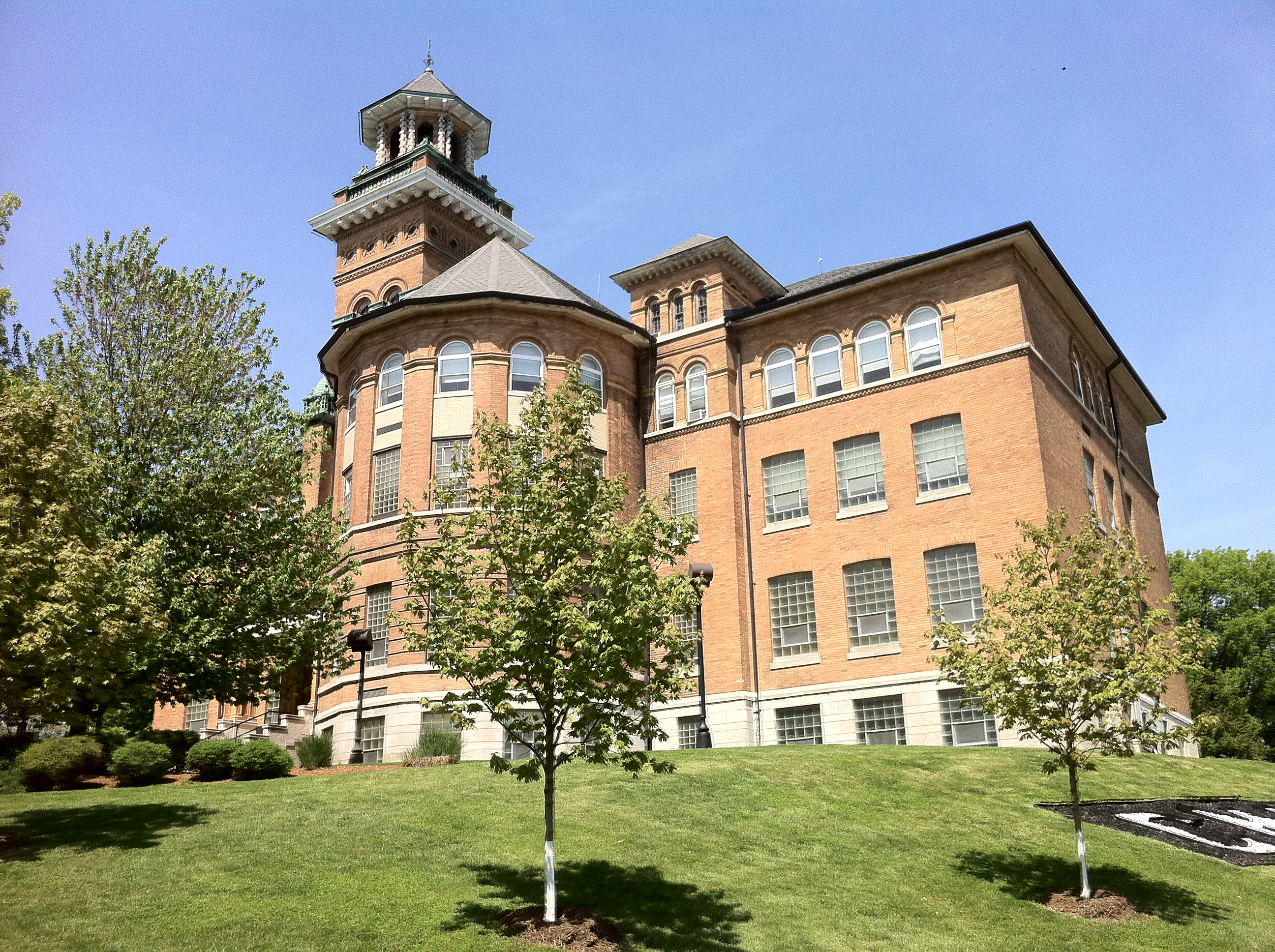

- Location within Missouri Location within the United States
- Location: Roughly bounded by Mulberry, Elm, Church and MO 5, Fayette, Missouri
- Area: 20 acres (8.1 ha)
- Built: 1848
- Architect: Multiple
- Architectural style: Late 19th And 20th Century Revivals, Classical Revival, Italianate
- NRHP reference No.: 80002357
- Added to NRHP: September 15, 1980

Central Methodist's main campus is in Fayette, Missouri. Notable features include Linn Memorial United Methodist Church, Swinney Conservatory, Brannock Hall, Little Theatre, Ashby-Hodge Gallery of American Art, and Quadrangle (aka "The Quad"). The college also has the Morrison Observatory next to the president's home across the street from the Fayette city park. On-campus cultural attractions include the Ashby-Hodge Gallery of American Art, Stephens Museum, concerts presented by the Swinney Conservatory of Music, and productions hosted in the Little Theatre or on the Quad. The 2004 film Killer Diller was filmed on campus and in various other locations owned by the university.

The Central Methodist College Campus Historic District was listed on the National Register of Historic Places in 1980. It encompasses 11 contributing buildings. They are Classic Hall (1911), Howard-Payne Hall (1852, 1889, 1921), Givens Hall (1848–1850), Brannock Hall (1856), Cupples Hall (1899), Clingenpeel Physical Education Building (1906), T. Berry Smith Hall (1890), Swinney Conservatory of Music (1927), Paul H. Linn Memorial Methodist Church and Cross Memorial Tower (1929–1931), Rice H. Cooper Parish House (1927), and Morrison Observatory (1875, 1935).

=== Buildings located on campus ===
- Brannock Hall

Brannock Hall was built in 1856. It stood through the Civil War and functioned as Fayette's weather center. Brannock sat empty from 1911 to 1914. It was then remolded into a boys' dormitory. In 1928 it became the administrative building on campus.

- Howard-Payne Hall

Howard Payne Hall was built in 1851 boarding house for women by William T. Lucky and Nathan Scarritt. The north wing was added from the burnt bricks that used to be Howard High School. The north wing was used to house classrooms. In 1859, Howard High School was chartered into Howard College. Eventually Central bought Howard College and it became a female dorm. Howard Payne Hall was closed for several years due to the use of soft bricks during its construction. In 1981, the building was reopened and used as a co-ed dorm and is still used this way in the present.

- Givens

Givens is the oldest structure on the CMU campus built in 1848–50. In 1903 it was used as a resident building for Howard Payne College presidents. In 1928 it was turned into a residence hall for Howard Payne female faculty. Givens has served the campus in many different ways. one way being that it was used in World War II as the Navy sick bay, and has also been used as a residence building for female students. It is now used to house alumni and guests.

- Cupples Hall

Built in 1896 by Samuel Cupples as a dormitory for men. In 1927 Cupples became a library to house the George M. Smiley collection. In 1969–70 it was renovated, and a new addition was added that doubled the size of the library and allowed for the placement of The Little Theatre below.

- Classic Hall

Classic Hall was built in 1911 and was considered to be the great learning center on campus. It was originally constructed to help keep Howard Payne College a self-contained college for women. This allowed Howard Payne to become strictly a dormitory. Classic Hall was used to house classrooms, performances, and a women's literary society. In 1981, it was shut down due to declining enrollment and a weakening structure. Classic Hall was renovated and reopened in 2012 as a home for Fine Arts.

- T. Berry Smith Hall

T. Berry Smith Hall was built from 1894 to 1895. It was designed in an Italianate fashion. At the beginning of the building's history all the departments of college. The Aristotelian and the Phi Alpha Literary Societies used to meet in this building. The room they met in has now been split into classrooms, but the stained glass panels still hang outside the classrooms. In 1928, T-Berry Smith Hall became the science hall on campus, and all other classes were moved out. In 1964 the science and math classes were moved to Stedman, and T. Berry was given its name after Central's chemistry professor and president. T. Berry Smith Hall now houses the social science, education, religion, and philosophy department. Also, Central's band is housed in this building.

- McMurry Hall

McMurry Hall was constructed during the 1920s. It was named after Bishop W. F. McMurry and was designed to look like an English manor house. It was built to serve as a dormitory for men, but in 1943–45 it served as barracks for the V-12 program located at Central Methodist. It was completely renovated in 2002. It now houses 200 students both male and female.

- Morrison Observatory
- Clingenpeel Physical Education Building

This building was built to replace the old wooden gym in 1906. During this time it was affectionately known as the "Cracker Box" because it was so small that the supporters had to view the game from the balcony. It was named in 1912 after Coach C. A. Clingenpeel. Clingenpeel was remodeled to house a women's gymnasium. It currently houses physical education offices.

- Swinney Conservatory

Was built in 1926–27 and is attached to Linn Memorial. The money donated to build the conservatory came from Mr. and Mrs. Edward F. Swinney, in 1922. It was originally built for Howard Payne College but was built on Central. It eventually was taken over by Central and became part of the campus. It now houses the music department.

- Puckett Field House

Puckett Field House was constructed from 1948 to 1949. It was dedicated in 1953 to E.P. Puckett who had always believed that CMU needed a proper athletic facility. it originally contained two basketball courts, a gymnastic area, and an indoor track.

- Holt Hall

Holt Hall was the first modern structure on campus. It was considered so modern because it had an elevator in the building. It was constructed in 1957 and was named after Ivan Lee Holt, Bishop of Missouri and Central Curator. Holt Hall used to house the dining hall for the campus; it was remodeled in 1983 and was named Mabee Dining Hall. The dining hall moved to the Student and Community Center in 2005. Holt now functions as a dormitory for females as well as the Admissions Offices.

- Burford Hall

Burford Hall was built from 1959 to 1960. It was named after Cyrus Burford, an alumnus of Central and a longtime member of the board of curators. The creation of this building also allowed for Howard-Payne to become inhabited by only women because there were now enough dorm rooms for men.

- Stedman Hall

Stedman Hall was built in 1962. The money for the building was donated by Samuel Stedman, a Central alumnus of 1935. He became a financial success on Wall Street. He had always intended to donate money to Central to build a new science building. However, he refused to have the building named after him. It was not until his death that the name was changed to Stedman Hall.

- Woodward Hall

Woodward was the last male dorm built on campus and was built in 1964. The building was named after Rev. Ralph L. Woodward who was the president at that time.

- The Little Theatre

The Little Theatre was constructed in 1969 by the John Epple family. It seats 228 patrons.

- President's Residence

The president's residence is located next to the Morrison Observatory. It was built in 1971 at the request of the president at that time, Harold Hamilton. The university presidents have been living there ever since.

- Philips Recreation Center

Philips Recreation Center was built in 1981 at the base of Puckett Field House. It consists of two indoor tennis courts, two racquetball courts, and the E.E. Rich Memorial Swimming Pool.

- Thogmorton Center for Allied Health

The Thogmorton Center for Allied Health opened for classes in August 2015. It is the newest academic building and offers increased lab and classroom space for nursing, athletic training, occupational and physical therapy assistant; high-tech simulation experience labs for nursing, and flexible classroom space for greater faculty-student interaction.

=== Regional campuses ===
The university also has several regional locations for continuing and graduate education programs in the Missouri communities of Clinton, Columbia, Dexter, Lake of the Ozarks, Linn, Macon (2010), Neosho, Park Hills, Poplar Bluff, Sedalia, St. Louis, Trenton, Union and Waynesville.

It also has an extensive online program and partnerships with several community colleges in Missouri, Iowa, and Illinois.

== Athletics ==
The Central Methodist athletic teams are called the Eagles. The university is a member of the National Association of Intercollegiate Athletics (NAIA), primarily competing in the Heart of America Athletic Conference (HAAC) since the 1991–92 academic year; which they were a member on a previous stint from 1971–72 to 1985–86. The Eagles previously competed as an NAIA Independent from 1986–87 to 1990–91; and in the Missouri College Athletic Union (MCAU) from 1924–25 to 1970–71.

Central Methodist competes in 21 intercollegiate varsity sports: Men's sports include baseball, basketball, bowling, cross country, football, golf, soccer, track & field, and wrestling; basketball, bowling, cross country, golf, soccer, softball, track & field, volleyball and wrestling; and co-ed sports include competitive cheer, competitive dance and eSports.

=== Fight song ===
In the late spring of 2006, Central Methodist University adopted an official fight song written by Andrew Glover, a 1983 alumnus of Central Methodist College, called Fighting Eagles. The previous unofficial fight song had been Hail, Victory written by Central College alum and former drum major Robert Earl Stepp.

== Notable alumni ==
- Abel Muzorewa, Prime Minister of Zimbabwe
- C. Fred Bergsten, American economist, author, and political adviser
- Frank P. Briggs, United States Senator from Missouri
- Murun Altankhuyag, professional soccer player and member of the Mongolia national football team
- Bill Chott, American actor and comedian
- Douglas A. Foster, religion historian at Abilene Christian University
- William Gillock, music educator and composer
- Boone Guyton, naval aviator
- David Holsinger, American composer and conductor
- Michael Johnson (attended), wrestler; The Ultimate Fighter 12 finalist, MMA fighter, currently competing in the Lightweight division of the UFC
- Samuel C. Major, Democratic U.S. Representative from Missouri
- Wendell Mayes, playwright and screenwriter
- William Fletcher McMurry, eponym of McMurry University
- Danielle Moore, French-born Missouri Republican state representative and member of NAACP
- Daniel Leeper Mumpower, medical missionary to the Congo and early recorder of the Otetela language
- Ira Richardson, president of Northwest Missouri State University and Adams State College
- John Clark Salyer II, "Father of the National Wildlife Refuge System."
- Huston Smith, religious studies scholar in the United States
- Claude T. Smith, music composer and conductor
- Henry George Steinbrenner III, Part owner of the New York Yankees and elder son of George Steinbrenner.
- Tyler Steinkamp (attended), Video game streamer
- Roger B. Wilson, Democratic governor of Missouri

== Notable faculty ==
- Keith E. House, dean and professor, Swinney Conservatory of Music
- Nannie Louise Wright, dean, Swinney Conservatory of Music
