= 1964 United States Senate election in Missouri =

- November 3, 1964
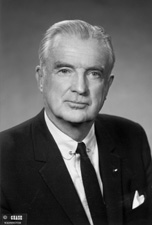

Nominee	Stuart Symington	Jean Paul Bradshaw
Party	Democratic	Republican
Popular vote	1,186,666	596,377
Percentage	66.55%	33.45%
- County results Symington: 50–60% 60–70% 70–80% 80–90% Bradshaw: 50–60% 60–70%
U.S. senator before election
Stuart Symington
Democratic
Elected U.S. Senator
Stuart Symington
Democratic

The 1964 United States Senate election in Missouri took place on November 3, 1964. Incumbent Democratic U.S. Senator Stuart Symington was re-elected to a third term in office over Republican Jean Paul Bradshaw.

== Democratic primary ==
=== Candidates ===
- Stuart Symington, incumbent Senator since 1953
- William McKinley Thomas, perennial candidate
- Wilford G. Winholtz

=== Results ===
1964 Democratic U.S. Senate primary
Party	Candidate	Votes	%
Democratic	Stuart Symington (incumbent)	563,313	91.99%
Democratic	William McKinley Thomas	35,509	5.80%
Democratic	Wilford G. Winholtz	13,550	2.21%
Total votes		612,372	100.00%

== Republican primary ==
=== Candidates ===
- Jean Paul Bradshaw, nominee for Governor in 1944
- Morris Duncan

=== Results ===
1964 Republican U.S. Senate primary
Party	Candidate	Votes	%
Republican	Jean Paul Bradshaw	164,048	78.19%
Republican	Morris Duncan	46,030	21.81%
Total votes		211,078	100.00%

== General election ==
=== Results ===
General election results
Party	Candidate	Votes	%	±%
Democratic	Stuart Symington (incumbent)	1,186,666	66.55%	▼0.10
Republican	Jean Paul Bradshaw	596,377	33.45%	▲0.10
Turnout		1,783,043	100.00%	
Democratic hold				

== See also ==
- 1964 United States Senate elections
