= Frank P. Briggs =

American politician (1894–1992)

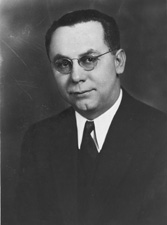

United States Senator from Missouri
- In office January 18, 1945 – January 3, 1947
- Appointed by: Phil M. Donnelly
- Preceded by: Harry S. Truman
- Succeeded by: James P. Kem

President pro tempore of the Missouri Senate
- In office 1940–1945
- Preceded by: Phil M. Donnelly
- Succeeded by: Marion Charles Matthes

Member of the Missouri Senate
- In office January 4, 1933 – January 16, 1945
- Preceded by: Arthur G. Hildreth
- Succeeded by: Harry Revercomb
- Constituency: 9th district

Mayor of Macon, Missouri
- In office 1930–1933
- Preceded by: Dudley L. Dempsey
- Succeeded by: Raymie E. Burch

Personal details
- Born: Frank Parks Briggs; February 25, 1894 Armstrong, Missouri, US
- Died: September 23, 1992 (aged 98) Macon, Missouri, US
- Resting place: Walnut Ridge Cemetery, Fayette, Missouri, US
- Party: Democratic
- Spouse: Catherine Allen Shull (m. 1916)
- Children: 5
- Education: University of Missouri
- Profession: Newspaper owner

Frank Parks Briggs (February 25, 1894 – September 23, 1992) was a United States senator from Missouri, and succeeded Harry S. Truman when Truman was elected vice president.

== Early life ==
Frank P. Briggs was born in Armstrong, Missouri on February 25, 1894, the son of Thomas Hale Briggs and Susan Almira (Ryle) Briggs. He attended the schools of Armstrong and Fayette, and was a student at Central College from 1911 to 1914. He graduated from the University of Missouri in Columbia in 1915. In May 1916, Briggs married Catherine Allen Shull. They were the parents of three daughters, Ruth, Betty, Dorothy and two sons Eugene, and Tommy.

Briggs became active in the newspaper and publishing businesses in Macon, Missouri as owner of the Macon Chronicle-Herald. In addition to serving as editor and publisher, Briggs was also the author of a regular column, "It Seems to B". Briggs was a member of Sigma Delta Chi and the Missouri Press Association. He served as president of the Missouri Associated Dailies, and was a member of the National Press Club. In 1958 he received the University of Missouri School of Journalism's Distinguished Service in Journalism Award.

== Political career ==
A Democrat, he was mayor of Macon from 1930 to 1933. He served in the Missouri Senate from 1933 to 1945. From 1940 to 1945, he served as the state senate's president pro tempore.

In 1944, Briggs managed the successful Missouri gubernatorial campaign of Phil M. Donnelly. On January 18, 1945, Donnelly appointed Briggs to fill the U.S. Senate vacancy caused when Harry S. Truman resigned to become vice president. He served from January 18, 1945, to January 3, 1947, and was an unsuccessful candidate for election to the full term in 1946.

After leaving the Senate, Briggs resumed work in his newspaper and publishing businesses. In 1952, he managed Donnelly's successful campaign to return to the governorship. briggs was a longtime member of the Missouri State Conservation Commission, and served four terms as its chairman. From 1961 to 1965 he was United States Assistant Secretary of the Interior for Fish and Wildlife. In 1961, he received the honorary degree of Doctor of Science from Central College.

== Later life ==
Briggs sold his newspaper in 1973, after which he lived in retirement in Macon. His fraternal and civic activities included service as Grand High Priest of the Grand Chapter of Royal Arch Masons of Missouri from 1936 to 1937, and Grand Master of the Grand Lodge of Ancient Free and Accepted Masons of Missouri in 1957. He was a member of Macon's Rotary and Elks clubs, and was active in the First Baptist Church of Macon.

Briggs died at Samaritan Hospital in Macon on September 23, 1992. He was buried at Walnut Ridge Cemetery in Fayette.

Party political offices
| Preceded by Harry S. Truman | Democratic nominee for U.S. Senator from Missouri (Class 1); 1946 | Succeeded by Stuart Symington |
U.S. Senate
| Preceded by Harry S. Truman | U.S. senator (Class 1) from Missouri; 1945–1947; Served alongside: Forrest C. Donnell | Succeeded by James P. Kem |
Honorary titles
| Preceded by Gladys Pyle | Oldest living U.S. senator March 14, 1989 – September 23, 1992 | Succeeded by Milward Simpson |
