= 1958 United States Senate election in Missouri =

- November 4, 1958
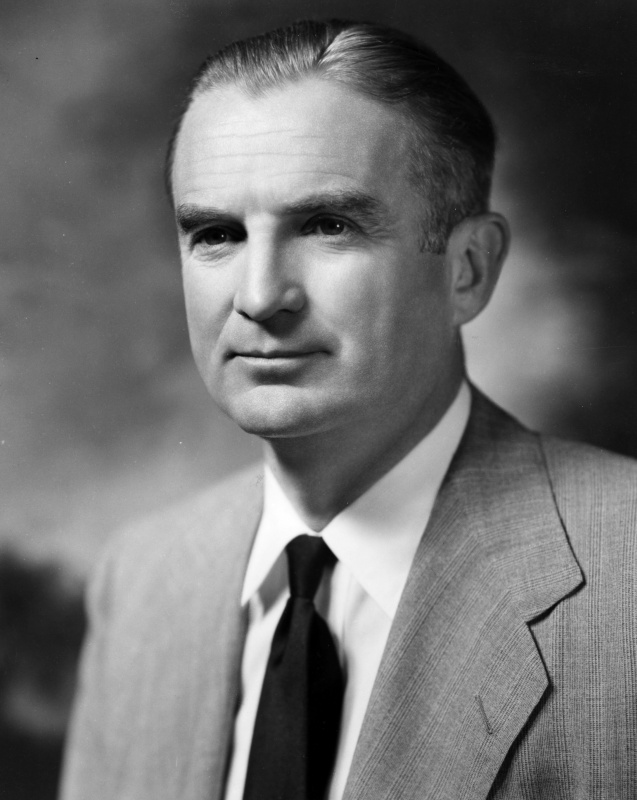

Nominee	Stuart Symington	Hazel Palmer
Party	Democratic	Republican
Popular vote	780,083	393,847
Percentage	66.45%	33.55%
- County results Symington: 50–60% 60–70% 80–90% >90% Palmer: 50–60% 60–70%
U.S. senator before election
Stuart Symington
Democratic
Elected U.S. Senator
Stuart Symington
Democratic

The 1958 United States Senate election in Missouri was held on November 4, 1958.

Incumbent Senator Stuart Symington was re-elected to a second term in office.

== Democratic primary ==
=== Candidates ===
- Lamar Dye, Gladstone resident
- Lawrence Hastings, Aurora resident
- Stuart Symington, incumbent Senator

=== Results ===
1958 Democratic U.S. Senate primary
Party	Candidate	Votes	%
Democratic	Stuart Symington (incumbent)	365,470	92.13%
Democratic	Lawrence Hastings	19,954	5.03%
Democratic	Lamar Dye	11,262	2.84%
Total votes		396,686	100.00%

== Republican primary ==
=== Candidates ===
- Homer Cotton, nominee for Missouri's 8th congressional district in 1938
- Herman Grosby, perennial candidate
- Hazel Palmer, attorney, President of the Business and Professional Women's Foundation, and daughter of former U.S. Representative John William Palmer
- William McKinley Thomas, perennial candidate

=== Results ===
Hazel Palmer became the first woman ever nominated for United States Senate in Missouri.

Primary results by county: Palmer: 30–40%; 40–50%; 50–60%; 60–70%; 70–80%; >90%; Thomas: 20–30%; 30–40%; 40–50%; Cotton: 30–40%; 40–50%

1958 Republican U.S. Senate primary
Party	Candidate	Votes	%
Republican	Hazel Palmer	61,481	44.63%
Republican	William McKinley Thomas	36,438	26.45%
Republican	Homer Cotton	27,023	19.62%
Republican	Herman G. Grosby	12,818	9.31%
Total votes		137,760	100.00%

== General election ==
=== Results ===
General election results
Party	Candidate	Votes	%	±%
Democratic	Stuart Symington (incumbent)	780,083	66.45%	▲12.46
Republican	Hazel Palmer	393,847	33.55%	▼12.39
Total votes		1,173,930	100.00%	

== See also ==
- 1958 United States Senate elections
