= Macon Chronicle-Herald =

Newspaper in Missouri, U.S.

- Type: Daily newspaper
- Owner: GateHouse Media
- Publisher: Pat Quinly
- Editor: Alecia Lassing
- Headquarters: 204 West Bourke Street, Macon, Missouri 63552, United States
- Website: MaconCH.com

The Macon Chronicle-Herald was a daily newspaper published in Macon, Missouri, United States. It began publishing in 1910 as the Daily Chronicle. As of 2014, was owned by GateHouse Media. It stopped publishing on July 30, 2014.

From 1925 to 1973, the newspaper was owned by Frank P. Briggs, a Democrat who served as mayor and a member of the Missouri Senate, and who succeeded Harry S. Truman in the United States Senate.

At the end of July, Lewis County Press, which owns the Macon County Home Press, a weekly Macon County newspaper, bought the assets of the 104-year-old Chronicle-Herald from Gatehouse Media Inc., which filed for bankruptcy protection in the fall of 2013.
