= 1946 United States Senate election in Missouri =

Senate election in Missouri

- November 5, 1946
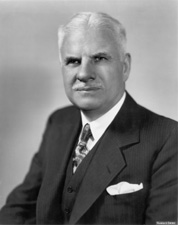

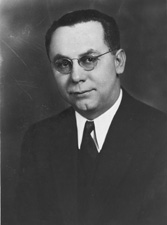
Nominee	James P. Kem	Frank P. Briggs
Party	Republican	Democratic
Popular vote	572,556	511,544
Percentage	52.71%	47.09%
- County results Kem: 50–60% 60–70% 70–80% 80–90% Briggs: 50–60% 60–70% 70–80% 80–90%
U.S. senator before election
Frank P. Briggs
Democratic
Elected U.S. Senator
James P. Kem
Republican

The 1946 United States Senate election in Missouri was held on November 5, 1946.

Incumbent Democratic Senator Frank P. Briggs, who was appointed to fill the vacancy left by President Harry S. Truman, ran for election to a full term in office, but was defeated by Republican James P. Kem.

== Democratic primary ==
=== Candidates ===
- Frank P. Briggs, incumbent senator since 1945
- Marvin Casteel
- James Patrick Quinn
- Robert I. Young, perennial candidate

=== Results ===
1946 Democratic U.S. Senate primary
Party	Candidate	Votes	%
Democratic	Frank P. Briggs (incumbent)	205,732	70.43%
Democratic	Marvin Casteel	49,101	16.81%
Democratic	Robert I. Young	30,233	10.35%
Democratic	James Patrick Quinn	7,026	2.41%
Total votes		292,092	100.00%

== Republican primary ==
=== Candidates ===
- William P. Elmer, U.S. representative from Salem
- Herman G. Grosby
- James P. Kem, corporate attorney and chairman of the Jackson County Republican Committee
- Ray Mabee, former state senator from Unionville
- William McKinley Thomas, perennial candidate

=== Results ===
1946 Republican U.S. Senate primary
Party	Candidate	Votes	%
Republican	James P. Kem	118,227	54.60%
Republican	William McKinley Thomas	31,866	14.72%
Republican	William P. Elmer	28,863	13.33%
Republican	Ray Mabee	21,104	9.75%
Republican	Herman G. Grosby	16,463	7.60%
Total votes		216,523	100.00%

== General election ==
=== Results ===
1946 U.S. Senate election in Missouri
Party	Candidate	Votes	%	±%
Republican	James P. Kem	572,556	52.71%	▲3.98
Democratic	Frank P. Briggs (incumbent)	511,544	47.09%	▼4.08
Prohibition	F. H. Jackson	979	0.09%	N/A
Socialist	W. F. Rinck	887	0.08%	▼0.01
Socialist Labor	Theodore Baeff	275	0.03%	▲0.02
Total votes		1,086,241	100.00%	

== See also ==
- 1946 United States Senate elections
