= List of United States senators from Missouri =

Current delegation

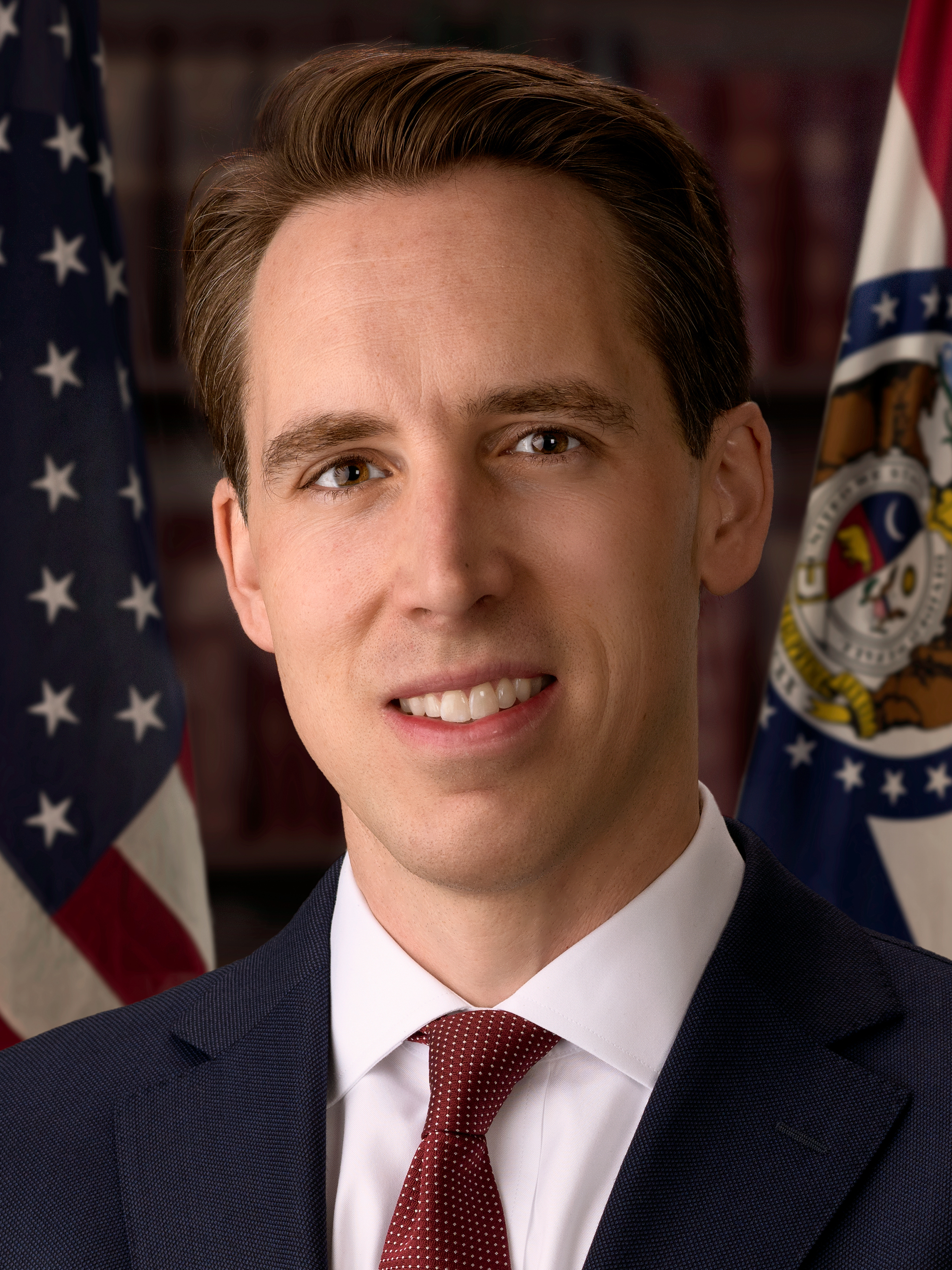
Josh Hawley (R)

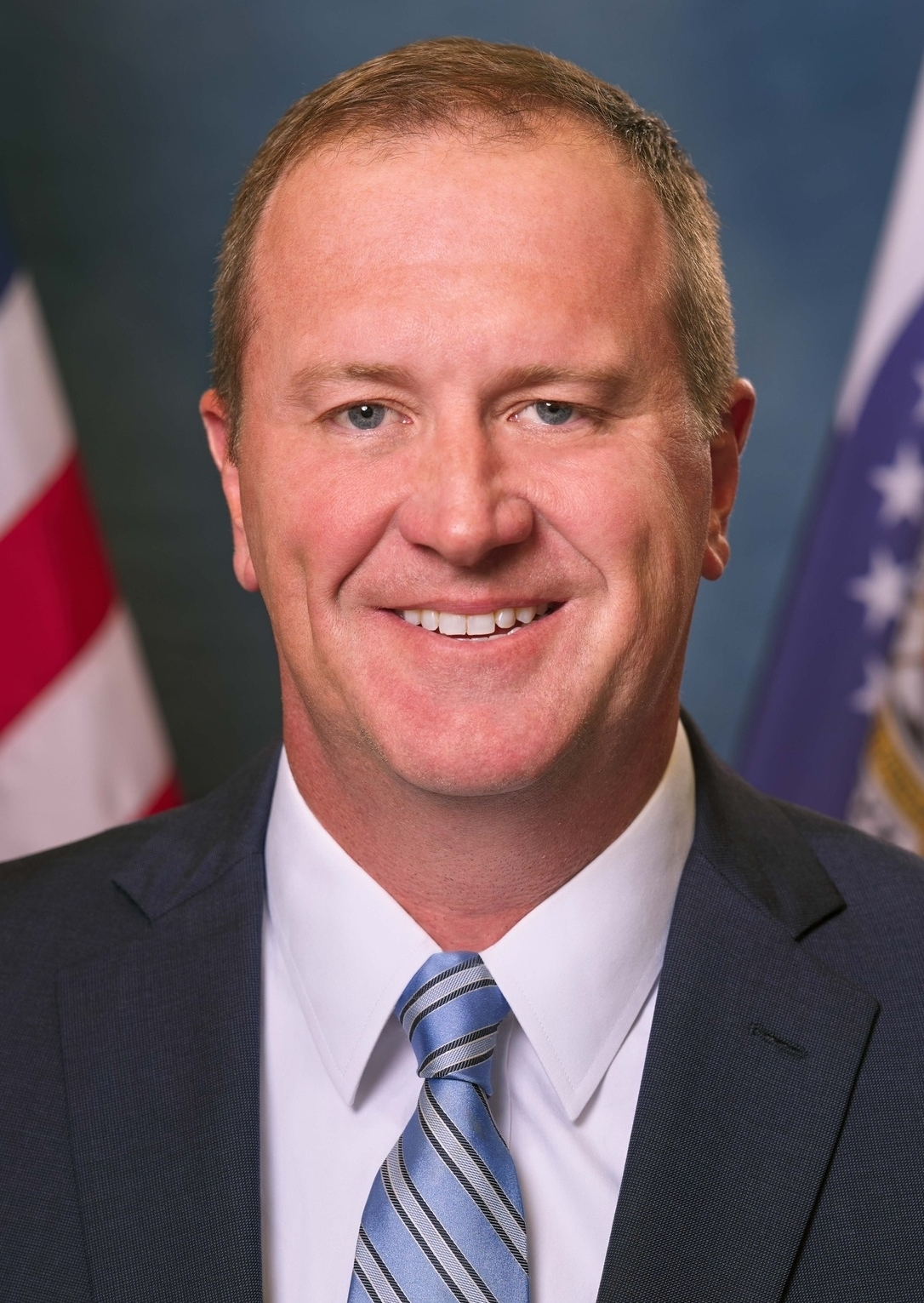
Eric Schmitt (R)

(ordered by seniority)

Missouri was admitted to the Union on August 10, 1821. Its current U.S. senators are Republicans Josh Hawley (class 1, serving since 2019) and Eric Schmitt (class 3, serving since 2023). Francis Cockrell was Missouri's longest-serving senator (1875–1905).

== List of senators ==
Class 1 Class 1 senators belong to the electoral cycle that most recently had regular elections in 2006, 2012, 2018, and 2024. The next election will be in 2030.						C	Class 3 Class 3 senators belong to the electoral cycle that most recently had regular elections in 2004, 2010, 2016, and 2022. The next election will be in 2028.					
#	Senator	Party	Dates in office	Electoral history	T	C	T	Electoral history	Dates in office	Party	Senator	#
1	Thomas Hart Benton (St. Louis)	Democratic- Republican	Aug 10, 1821 – Mar 3, 1851	Elected in 1821.	1	17th	1	Elected in 1821.	Aug 10, 1821 – Mar 3, 1831	Democratic- Republican	David Barton (St. Louis)	1
1	Thomas Hart Benton (St. Louis)	Democratic- Republican	Aug 10, 1821 – Mar 3, 1851	Elected in 1821.	1	18th	1	Elected in 1821.	Aug 10, 1821 – Mar 3, 1831	Democratic- Republican	David Barton (St. Louis)	1
1	Thomas Hart Benton (St. Louis)	Jacksonian	Aug 10, 1821 – Mar 3, 1851	Elected in 1821.	1	19th	2	Re-elected in 1825. Lost re-election.	Aug 10, 1821 – Mar 3, 1831	National; Republican	David Barton (St. Louis)	1
1	Thomas Hart Benton (St. Louis)	Jacksonian	Aug 10, 1821 – Mar 3, 1851	Re-elected in 1827.	2	20th	2	Re-elected in 1825. Lost re-election.	Aug 10, 1821 – Mar 3, 1831	National; Republican	David Barton (St. Louis)	1
1	Thomas Hart Benton (St. Louis)	Jacksonian	Aug 10, 1821 – Mar 3, 1851	Re-elected in 1827.	2	21st	2	Re-elected in 1825. Lost re-election.	Aug 10, 1821 – Mar 3, 1831	National; Republican	David Barton (St. Louis)	1
1	Thomas Hart Benton (St. Louis)	Jacksonian	Aug 10, 1821 – Mar 3, 1851	Re-elected in 1827.	2	22nd	3	Elected in 1830. Died.	Mar 4, 1831 – Jun 6, 1833	Jacksonian	Alexander Buckner (Jackson)	2
1	Thomas Hart Benton (St. Louis)	Jacksonian	Aug 10, 1821 – Mar 3, 1851	Re-elected in 1833.	3	23rd	3	Elected in 1830. Died.	Mar 4, 1831 – Jun 6, 1833	Jacksonian	Alexander Buckner (Jackson)	2
1	Thomas Hart Benton (St. Louis)	Jacksonian	Aug 10, 1821 – Mar 3, 1851	Re-elected in 1833.	3	23rd	3		Jun 6, 1833 – Oct 25, 1833	Vacant		
1	Thomas Hart Benton (St. Louis)	Jacksonian	Aug 10, 1821 – Mar 3, 1851	Re-elected in 1833.	3	23rd	3	Appointed to continue Buckner's term. Elected to finish Buckner's term.	Oct 25, 1833 – Oct 3, 1843	Jacksonian	Lewis F. Linn (Ste. Genevieve)	3
1	Thomas Hart Benton (St. Louis)	Jacksonian	Aug 10, 1821 – Mar 3, 1851	Re-elected in 1833.	3	24th	3	Appointed to continue Buckner's term. Elected to finish Buckner's term.	Oct 25, 1833 – Oct 3, 1843	Jacksonian	Lewis F. Linn (Ste. Genevieve)	3
1	Thomas Hart Benton (St. Louis)	Democratic	Aug 10, 1821 – Mar 3, 1851	Re-elected in 1833.	3	25th	4	Re-elected in 1836.	Oct 25, 1833 – Oct 3, 1843	Democratic	Lewis F. Linn (Ste. Genevieve)	3
1	Thomas Hart Benton (St. Louis)	Democratic	Aug 10, 1821 – Mar 3, 1851	Re-elected in 1839.	4	26th	4	Re-elected in 1836.	Oct 25, 1833 – Oct 3, 1843	Democratic	Lewis F. Linn (Ste. Genevieve)	3
1	Thomas Hart Benton (St. Louis)	Democratic	Aug 10, 1821 – Mar 3, 1851	Re-elected in 1839.	4	27th	4	Re-elected in 1836.	Oct 25, 1833 – Oct 3, 1843	Democratic	Lewis F. Linn (Ste. Genevieve)	3
1	Thomas Hart Benton (St. Louis)	Democratic	Aug 10, 1821 – Mar 3, 1851	Re-elected in 1839.	4	28th	5	Re-elected in 1842. Died.	Oct 25, 1833 – Oct 3, 1843	Democratic	Lewis F. Linn (Ste. Genevieve)	3
1	Thomas Hart Benton (St. Louis)	Democratic	Aug 10, 1821 – Mar 3, 1851	Re-elected in 1839.	4	28th	5		Oct 3, 1843 – Oct 14, 1843	Vacant		
1	Thomas Hart Benton (St. Louis)	Democratic	Aug 10, 1821 – Mar 3, 1851	Re-elected in 1839.	4	28th	5	Appointed to continue Linn's term. Elected to finish Linn's term.	Oct 14, 1843 – Mar 3, 1855	Democratic	David Rice Atchison (Platte City)	4
1	Thomas Hart Benton (St. Louis)	Democratic	Aug 10, 1821 – Mar 3, 1851	Re-elected in 1845. Lost re-election.	5	29th	5	Appointed to continue Linn's term. Elected to finish Linn's term.	Oct 14, 1843 – Mar 3, 1855	Democratic	David Rice Atchison (Platte City)	4
1	Thomas Hart Benton (St. Louis)	Democratic	Aug 10, 1821 – Mar 3, 1851	Re-elected in 1845. Lost re-election.	5	30th	5	Appointed to continue Linn's term. Elected to finish Linn's term.	Oct 14, 1843 – Mar 3, 1855	Democratic	David Rice Atchison (Platte City)	4
1	Thomas Hart Benton (St. Louis)	Democratic	Aug 10, 1821 – Mar 3, 1851	Re-elected in 1845. Lost re-election.	5	31st	6	Re-elected in 1849. Lost re-election.	Oct 14, 1843 – Mar 3, 1855	Democratic	David Rice Atchison (Platte City)	4
2	Henry S. Geyer (St. Louis)	Whig	Mar 4, 1851 – Mar 3, 1857	Elected in 1851. Retired.	6	32nd	6	Re-elected in 1849. Lost re-election.	Oct 14, 1843 – Mar 3, 1855	Democratic	David Rice Atchison (Platte City)	4
2	Henry S. Geyer (St. Louis)	Whig	Mar 4, 1851 – Mar 3, 1857	Elected in 1851. Retired.	6	33rd	6	Re-elected in 1849. Lost re-election.	Oct 14, 1843 – Mar 3, 1855	Democratic	David Rice Atchison (Platte City)	4
2	Henry S. Geyer (St. Louis)	Whig	Mar 4, 1851 – Mar 3, 1857	Elected in 1851. Retired.	6	34th	7	Failure to elect.	Mar 4, 1855 – Jan 12, 1857	Vacant		
2	Henry S. Geyer (St. Louis)	Whig	Mar 4, 1851 – Mar 3, 1857	Elected in 1851. Retired.	6	34th	7	Elected late in 1857. Retired or lost re-election.	Jan 12, 1857 – Mar 3, 1861	Democratic	James S. Green (Canton)	5
3	Trusten Polk (St. Louis)	Democratic	Mar 4, 1857 – Jan 10, 1862	Elected in 1857. Expelled for supporting the Confederacy in the American Civil War.	7	35th	7	Elected late in 1857. Retired or lost re-election.	Jan 12, 1857 – Mar 3, 1861	Democratic	James S. Green (Canton)	5
3	Trusten Polk (St. Louis)	Democratic	Mar 4, 1857 – Jan 10, 1862	Elected in 1857. Expelled for supporting the Confederacy in the American Civil War.	7	36th	7	Elected late in 1857. Retired or lost re-election.	Jan 12, 1857 – Mar 3, 1861	Democratic	James S. Green (Canton)	5
3	Trusten Polk (St. Louis)	Democratic	Mar 4, 1857 – Jan 10, 1862	Elected in 1857. Expelled for supporting the Confederacy in the American Civil War.	7	37th	8		Mar 4, 1861 – Mar 17, 1861	Vacant		
3	Trusten Polk (St. Louis)	Democratic	Mar 4, 1857 – Jan 10, 1862	Elected in 1857. Expelled for supporting the Confederacy in the American Civil War.	7	37th	8	Elected late in 1861. Expelled for supporting the Confederacy in the American Civil War.	Mar 17, 1861 – Jan 10, 1862	Democratic	Waldo Johnson (Osceola)	6
Vacant			Jan 10, 1862 – Jan 17, 1862		7	37th	8		Jan 10, 1862 – Jan 17, 1862	Vacant		
4	John B. Henderson (Louisiana)	Union	Jan 17, 1862 – Mar 3, 1869	Appointed to continue Polk's term.	7	37th	8	Appointed to continue Johnson's term. Successor qualified.	Jan 17, 1862 – Nov 13, 1863	Union	Robert Wilson (St. Joseph)	7
4	John B. Henderson (Louisiana)	Emancipation	Jan 17, 1862 – Mar 3, 1869	Elected to finish Polk's term.	7	37th	8	Appointed to continue Johnson's term. Successor qualified.	Jan 17, 1862 – Nov 13, 1863	Union	Robert Wilson (St. Joseph)	7
4	John B. Henderson (Louisiana)	Radical Union	Jan 17, 1862 – Mar 3, 1869	Re-elected in 1863. Retired.	8	38th	8	Appointed to continue Johnson's term. Successor qualified.	Jan 17, 1862 – Nov 13, 1863	Union	Robert Wilson (St. Joseph)	7
4	John B. Henderson (Louisiana)	Radical Union	Jan 17, 1862 – Mar 3, 1869	Re-elected in 1863. Retired.	8	38th	8	Elected to finish Johnson's term. Retired due to ill health.	Nov 13, 1863 – Mar 3, 1867	Radical Union	B. Gratz Brown (St. Louis)	8
4	John B. Henderson (Louisiana)	Republican	Jan 17, 1862 – Mar 3, 1869	Re-elected in 1863. Retired.	8	39th	8	Elected to finish Johnson's term. Retired due to ill health.	Nov 13, 1863 – Mar 3, 1867	Republican	B. Gratz Brown (St. Louis)	8
4	John B. Henderson (Louisiana)	Republican	Jan 17, 1862 – Mar 3, 1869	Re-elected in 1863. Retired.	8	40th	9	Elected in 1866 or 1867. Resigned to become Chief Justice of the U.S. Court of Claims.	Mar 4, 1867 – Dec 19, 1870	Republican	Charles D. Drake (St. Louis)	9
5	Carl Schurz (St. Louis)	Republican	Mar 4, 1869 – Mar 3, 1875	Elected in 1868. Retired.	9	41st	9	Elected in 1866 or 1867. Resigned to become Chief Justice of the U.S. Court of Claims.	Mar 4, 1867 – Dec 19, 1870	Republican	Charles D. Drake (St. Louis)	9
5	Carl Schurz (St. Louis)	Liberal Republican	Mar 4, 1869 – Mar 3, 1875	Elected in 1868. Retired.	9	41st	9	Appointed to continue Drake's term. Retired when successor elected.	Dec 19, 1870 – Jan 20, 1871	Republican	Daniel T. Jewett (St. Louis)	10
5	Carl Schurz (St. Louis)	Liberal Republican	Mar 4, 1869 – Mar 3, 1875	Elected in 1868. Retired.	9	42nd	9	Elected to finish Drake's term. Lost re-election.	Jan 20, 1871 – Mar 3, 1873	Democratic	Francis P. Blair (St. Louis)	11
5	Carl Schurz (St. Louis)	Republican	Mar 4, 1869 – Mar 3, 1875	Elected in 1868. Retired.	9	42nd	9	Elected to finish Drake's term. Lost re-election.	Jan 20, 1871 – Mar 3, 1873	Democratic	Francis P. Blair (St. Louis)	11
5	Carl Schurz (St. Louis)	Republican	Mar 4, 1869 – Mar 3, 1875	Elected in 1868. Retired.	9	43rd	10	Elected in 1872 or 1873. Died.	Mar 4, 1873 – Sep 20, 1877	Democratic	Lewis V. Bogy (St. Louis)	12
6	Francis Cockrell (Warrensburg)	Democratic	Mar 4, 1875 – Mar 3, 1905	Elected in 1874.	10	44th	10	Elected in 1872 or 1873. Died.	Mar 4, 1873 – Sep 20, 1877	Democratic	Lewis V. Bogy (St. Louis)	12
6	Francis Cockrell (Warrensburg)	Democratic	Mar 4, 1875 – Mar 3, 1905	Elected in 1874.	10	45th	10	Elected in 1872 or 1873. Died.	Mar 4, 1873 – Sep 20, 1877	Democratic	Lewis V. Bogy (St. Louis)	12
6	Francis Cockrell (Warrensburg)	Democratic	Mar 4, 1875 – Mar 3, 1905	Elected in 1874.	10	45th	10		Sep 20, 1877 – Sep 29, 1877	Vacant		
6	Francis Cockrell (Warrensburg)	Democratic	Mar 4, 1875 – Mar 3, 1905	Elected in 1874.	10	45th	10	Appointed to continue Bogy's term. Retired.	Sep 29, 1877 – Jan 26, 1879	Democratic	David H. Armstrong (St. Louis)	13
6	Francis Cockrell (Warrensburg)	Democratic	Mar 4, 1875 – Mar 3, 1905	Elected in 1874.	10	45th	10	Elected to finish Bogy's term. Retired.	Jan 27, 1879 – Mar 3, 1879	Democratic	James Shields (Carrollton)	14
6	Francis Cockrell (Warrensburg)	Democratic	Mar 4, 1875 – Mar 3, 1905	Elected in 1874.	10	46th	11	Elected in 1879.	Mar 4, 1879 – Mar 3, 1903	Democratic	George G. Vest (Sweet Springs)	15
6	Francis Cockrell (Warrensburg)	Democratic	Mar 4, 1875 – Mar 3, 1905	Re-elected in 1881.	11	47th	11	Elected in 1879.	Mar 4, 1879 – Mar 3, 1903	Democratic	George G. Vest (Sweet Springs)	15
6	Francis Cockrell (Warrensburg)	Democratic	Mar 4, 1875 – Mar 3, 1905	Re-elected in 1881.	11	48th	11	Elected in 1879.	Mar 4, 1879 – Mar 3, 1903	Democratic	George G. Vest (Sweet Springs)	15
6	Francis Cockrell (Warrensburg)	Democratic	Mar 4, 1875 – Mar 3, 1905	Re-elected in 1881.	11	49th	12	Re-elected in 1885.	Mar 4, 1879 – Mar 3, 1903	Democratic	George G. Vest (Sweet Springs)	15
6	Francis Cockrell (Warrensburg)	Democratic	Mar 4, 1875 – Mar 3, 1905	Re-elected in 1887.	12	50th	12	Re-elected in 1885.	Mar 4, 1879 – Mar 3, 1903	Democratic	George G. Vest (Sweet Springs)	15
6	Francis Cockrell (Warrensburg)	Democratic	Mar 4, 1875 – Mar 3, 1905	Re-elected in 1887.	12	51st	12	Re-elected in 1885.	Mar 4, 1879 – Mar 3, 1903	Democratic	George G. Vest (Sweet Springs)	15
6	Francis Cockrell (Warrensburg)	Democratic	Mar 4, 1875 – Mar 3, 1905	Re-elected in 1887.	12	52nd	13	Re-elected in 1891.	Mar 4, 1879 – Mar 3, 1903	Democratic	George G. Vest (Sweet Springs)	15
6	Francis Cockrell (Warrensburg)	Democratic	Mar 4, 1875 – Mar 3, 1905	Re-elected in 1893.	13	53rd	13	Re-elected in 1891.	Mar 4, 1879 – Mar 3, 1903	Democratic	George G. Vest (Sweet Springs)	15
6	Francis Cockrell (Warrensburg)	Democratic	Mar 4, 1875 – Mar 3, 1905	Re-elected in 1893.	13	54th	13	Re-elected in 1891.	Mar 4, 1879 – Mar 3, 1903	Democratic	George G. Vest (Sweet Springs)	15
6	Francis Cockrell (Warrensburg)	Democratic	Mar 4, 1875 – Mar 3, 1905	Re-elected in 1893.	13	55th	14	Re-elected in 1897. Retired.	Mar 4, 1879 – Mar 3, 1903	Democratic	George G. Vest (Sweet Springs)	15
6	Francis Cockrell (Warrensburg)	Democratic	Mar 4, 1875 – Mar 3, 1905	Re-elected in 1899. Lost re-election.	14	56th	14	Re-elected in 1897. Retired.	Mar 4, 1879 – Mar 3, 1903	Democratic	George G. Vest (Sweet Springs)	15
6	Francis Cockrell (Warrensburg)	Democratic	Mar 4, 1875 – Mar 3, 1905	Re-elected in 1899. Lost re-election.	14	57th	14	Re-elected in 1897. Retired.	Mar 4, 1879 – Mar 3, 1903	Democratic	George G. Vest (Sweet Springs)	15
6	Francis Cockrell (Warrensburg)	Democratic	Mar 4, 1875 – Mar 3, 1905	Re-elected in 1899. Lost re-election.	14	58th	15	Elected in 1903.	Mar 4, 1903 – Apr 14, 1918	Democratic	William J. Stone (Jefferson City)	16
Vacant			Mar 4, 1905 – Mar 18, 1905		15	59th	15	Elected in 1903.	Mar 4, 1903 – Apr 14, 1918	Democratic	William J. Stone (Jefferson City)	16
7	William Warner (Kansas City)	Republican	Mar 18, 1905 – Mar 3, 1911	Elected late in 1905. Retired.	15	59th	15	Elected in 1903.	Mar 4, 1903 – Apr 14, 1918	Democratic	William J. Stone (Jefferson City)	16
7	William Warner (Kansas City)	Republican	Mar 18, 1905 – Mar 3, 1911	Elected late in 1905. Retired.	15	60th	15	Elected in 1903.	Mar 4, 1903 – Apr 14, 1918	Democratic	William J. Stone (Jefferson City)	16
7	William Warner (Kansas City)	Republican	Mar 18, 1905 – Mar 3, 1911	Elected late in 1905. Retired.	15	61st	16	Re-elected in 1909.	Mar 4, 1903 – Apr 14, 1918	Democratic	William J. Stone (Jefferson City)	16
8	James A. Reed (Kansas City)	Democratic	Mar 4, 1911 – Mar 3, 1929	Elected in 1910.	16	62nd	16	Re-elected in 1909.	Mar 4, 1903 – Apr 14, 1918	Democratic	William J. Stone (Jefferson City)	16
8	James A. Reed (Kansas City)	Democratic	Mar 4, 1911 – Mar 3, 1929	Elected in 1910.	16	63rd	16	Re-elected in 1909.	Mar 4, 1903 – Apr 14, 1918	Democratic	William J. Stone (Jefferson City)	16
8	James A. Reed (Kansas City)	Democratic	Mar 4, 1911 – Mar 3, 1929	Elected in 1910.	16	64th	17	Re-elected in 1914. Died.	Mar 4, 1903 – Apr 14, 1918	Democratic	William J. Stone (Jefferson City)	16
8	James A. Reed (Kansas City)	Democratic	Mar 4, 1911 – Mar 3, 1929	Re-elected in 1916.	17	65th	17	Re-elected in 1914. Died.	Mar 4, 1903 – Apr 14, 1918	Democratic	William J. Stone (Jefferson City)	16
8	James A. Reed (Kansas City)	Democratic	Mar 4, 1911 – Mar 3, 1929	Re-elected in 1916.	17	65th	17		Apr 14, 1918 – Apr 30, 1918	Vacant		
8	James A. Reed (Kansas City)	Democratic	Mar 4, 1911 – Mar 3, 1929	Re-elected in 1916.	17	65th	17	Appointed to continue Stone's term. Lost renomination to finish Stone's term.	Apr 30, 1918 – Nov 5, 1918	Democratic	Xenophon P. Wilfley (St. Louis)	17
8	James A. Reed (Kansas City)	Democratic	Mar 4, 1911 – Mar 3, 1929	Re-elected in 1916.	17	65th	17	Elected in 1918 to finish Stone's term.	Nov 6, 1918 – May 16, 1925	Republican	Selden P. Spencer (St. Louis)	18
8	James A. Reed (Kansas City)	Democratic	Mar 4, 1911 – Mar 3, 1929	Re-elected in 1916.	17	66th	17	Elected in 1918 to finish Stone's term.	Nov 6, 1918 – May 16, 1925	Republican	Selden P. Spencer (St. Louis)	18
8	James A. Reed (Kansas City)	Democratic	Mar 4, 1911 – Mar 3, 1929	Re-elected in 1916.	17	67th	18	Re-elected in 1920. Died.	Nov 6, 1918 – May 16, 1925	Republican	Selden P. Spencer (St. Louis)	18
8	James A. Reed (Kansas City)	Democratic	Mar 4, 1911 – Mar 3, 1929	Re-elected in 1922. Retired.	18	68th	18	Re-elected in 1920. Died.	Nov 6, 1918 – May 16, 1925	Republican	Selden P. Spencer (St. Louis)	18
8	James A. Reed (Kansas City)	Democratic	Mar 4, 1911 – Mar 3, 1929	Re-elected in 1922. Retired.	18	69th	18	Re-elected in 1920. Died.	Nov 6, 1918 – May 16, 1925	Republican	Selden P. Spencer (St. Louis)	18
8	James A. Reed (Kansas City)	Democratic	Mar 4, 1911 – Mar 3, 1929	Re-elected in 1922. Retired.	18	69th	18		May 16, 1925 – May 25, 1925	Vacant		
8	James A. Reed (Kansas City)	Democratic	Mar 4, 1911 – Mar 3, 1929	Re-elected in 1922. Retired.	18	69th	18	Appointed to continue Spencer's term. Lost elections to finish Spencer's term and to the next term.	May 25, 1925 – Dec 5, 1926	Republican	George H. Williams (St. Louis)	19
8	James A. Reed (Kansas City)	Democratic	Mar 4, 1911 – Mar 3, 1929	Re-elected in 1922. Retired.	18	69th	18	Elected to finish Spencer's term.	Dec 6, 1926 – Feb 3, 1933	Democratic	Harry B. Hawes (St. Louis)	20
8	James A. Reed (Kansas City)	Democratic	Mar 4, 1911 – Mar 3, 1929	Re-elected in 1922. Retired.	18	70th	19	Also elected to the next term in 1926. Retired, then resigned early.	Dec 6, 1926 – Feb 3, 1933	Democratic	Harry B. Hawes (St. Louis)	20
9	Roscoe C. Patterson (Kansas City)	Republican	Mar 4, 1929 – Jan 3, 1935	Elected in 1928. Lost re-election.	19	71st	19	Also elected to the next term in 1926. Retired, then resigned early.	Dec 6, 1926 – Feb 3, 1933	Democratic	Harry B. Hawes (St. Louis)	20
9	Roscoe C. Patterson (Kansas City)	Republican	Mar 4, 1929 – Jan 3, 1935	Elected in 1928. Lost re-election.	19	72nd	19	Also elected to the next term in 1926. Retired, then resigned early.	Dec 6, 1926 – Feb 3, 1933	Democratic	Harry B. Hawes (St. Louis)	20
9	Roscoe C. Patterson (Kansas City)	Republican	Mar 4, 1929 – Jan 3, 1935	Elected in 1928. Lost re-election.	19	72nd	19	Appointed to finish Hawes's term, having already been elected to the next term.	Feb 3, 1933 – Jan 3, 1945	Democratic	Joel B. Clark (St. Louis)	21
9	Roscoe C. Patterson (Kansas City)	Republican	Mar 4, 1929 – Jan 3, 1935	Elected in 1928. Lost re-election.	19	73rd	20	Elected in 1932.	Feb 3, 1933 – Jan 3, 1945	Democratic	Joel B. Clark (St. Louis)	21
10	Harry S. Truman (Independence)	Democratic	Jan 3, 1935 – Jan 17, 1945	Elected in 1934.	20	74th	20	Elected in 1932.	Feb 3, 1933 – Jan 3, 1945	Democratic	Joel B. Clark (St. Louis)	21
10	Harry S. Truman (Independence)	Democratic	Jan 3, 1935 – Jan 17, 1945	Elected in 1934.	20	75th	20	Elected in 1932.	Feb 3, 1933 – Jan 3, 1945	Democratic	Joel B. Clark (St. Louis)	21
10	Harry S. Truman (Independence)	Democratic	Jan 3, 1935 – Jan 17, 1945	Elected in 1934.	20	76th	21	Re-elected in 1938. Lost renomination.	Feb 3, 1933 – Jan 3, 1945	Democratic	Joel B. Clark (St. Louis)	21
10	Harry S. Truman (Independence)	Democratic	Jan 3, 1935 – Jan 17, 1945	Re-elected in 1940. Resigned to become U.S. Vice President.	21	77th	21	Re-elected in 1938. Lost renomination.	Feb 3, 1933 – Jan 3, 1945	Democratic	Joel B. Clark (St. Louis)	21
10	Harry S. Truman (Independence)	Democratic	Jan 3, 1935 – Jan 17, 1945	Re-elected in 1940. Resigned to become U.S. Vice President.	21	78th	21	Re-elected in 1938. Lost renomination.	Feb 3, 1933 – Jan 3, 1945	Democratic	Joel B. Clark (St. Louis)	21
10	Harry S. Truman (Independence)	Democratic	Jan 3, 1935 – Jan 17, 1945	Re-elected in 1940. Resigned to become U.S. Vice President.	21	79th	22	Elected in 1944. Lost re-election.	Jan 3, 1945 – Jan 3, 1951	Republican	Forrest C. Donnell (Webster Groves)	22
11	Frank P. Briggs (Macon)	Democratic	Jan 18, 1945 – Jan 3, 1947	Appointed to finish Truman's term. Lost election to full term.	21	79th	22	Elected in 1944. Lost re-election.	Jan 3, 1945 – Jan 3, 1951	Republican	Forrest C. Donnell (Webster Groves)	22
12	James P. Kem (Kansas City)	Republican	Jan 3, 1947 – Jan 3, 1953	Elected in 1946. Lost re-election.	22	80th	22	Elected in 1944. Lost re-election.	Jan 3, 1945 – Jan 3, 1951	Republican	Forrest C. Donnell (Webster Groves)	22
12	James P. Kem (Kansas City)	Republican	Jan 3, 1947 – Jan 3, 1953	Elected in 1946. Lost re-election.	22	81st	22	Elected in 1944. Lost re-election.	Jan 3, 1945 – Jan 3, 1951	Republican	Forrest C. Donnell (Webster Groves)	22
12	James P. Kem (Kansas City)	Republican	Jan 3, 1947 – Jan 3, 1953	Elected in 1946. Lost re-election.	22	82nd	23	Elected in 1950.	Jan 3, 1951 – Sep 13, 1960	Democratic	Thomas Hennings (St. Louis)	23
13	Stuart Symington (St. Louis)	Democratic	Jan 3, 1953 – Dec 27, 1976	Elected in 1952.	23	83rd	23	Elected in 1950.	Jan 3, 1951 – Sep 13, 1960	Democratic	Thomas Hennings (St. Louis)	23
13	Stuart Symington (St. Louis)	Democratic	Jan 3, 1953 – Dec 27, 1976	Elected in 1952.	23	84th	23	Elected in 1950.	Jan 3, 1951 – Sep 13, 1960	Democratic	Thomas Hennings (St. Louis)	23
13	Stuart Symington (St. Louis)	Democratic	Jan 3, 1953 – Dec 27, 1976	Elected in 1952.	23	85th	24	Re-elected in 1956. Died.	Jan 3, 1951 – Sep 13, 1960	Democratic	Thomas Hennings (St. Louis)	23
13	Stuart Symington (St. Louis)	Democratic	Jan 3, 1953 – Dec 27, 1976	Elected in 1958.	24	86th	24	Re-elected in 1956. Died.	Jan 3, 1951 – Sep 13, 1960	Democratic	Thomas Hennings (St. Louis)	23
13	Stuart Symington (St. Louis)	Democratic	Jan 3, 1953 – Dec 27, 1976	Elected in 1958.	24	86th	24		Sep 13, 1960 – Sep 23, 1960	Vacant		
13	Stuart Symington (St. Louis)	Democratic	Jan 3, 1953 – Dec 27, 1976	Elected in 1958.	24	86th	24	Appointed to continue Henning's term. Elected to finish Henning's term.	Sep 23, 1960 – Dec 27, 1968	Democratic	Edward V. Long (Clarksville)	24
13	Stuart Symington (St. Louis)	Democratic	Jan 3, 1953 – Dec 27, 1976	Elected in 1958.	24	87th	24	Appointed to continue Henning's term. Elected to finish Henning's term.	Sep 23, 1960 – Dec 27, 1968	Democratic	Edward V. Long (Clarksville)	24
13	Stuart Symington (St. Louis)	Democratic	Jan 3, 1953 – Dec 27, 1976	Elected in 1958.	24	88th	25	Re-elected in 1962. Lost renomination, and resigned early.	Sep 23, 1960 – Dec 27, 1968	Democratic	Edward V. Long (Clarksville)	24
13	Stuart Symington (St. Louis)	Democratic	Jan 3, 1953 – Dec 27, 1976	Elected in 1964.	25	89th	25	Re-elected in 1962. Lost renomination, and resigned early.	Sep 23, 1960 – Dec 27, 1968	Democratic	Edward V. Long (Clarksville)	24
13	Stuart Symington (St. Louis)	Democratic	Jan 3, 1953 – Dec 27, 1976	Elected in 1964.	25	90th	25	Re-elected in 1962. Lost renomination, and resigned early.	Sep 23, 1960 – Dec 27, 1968	Democratic	Edward V. Long (Clarksville)	24
13	Stuart Symington (St. Louis)	Democratic	Jan 3, 1953 – Dec 27, 1976	Elected in 1964.	25	90th	25	Appointed to finish Long's term, having been elected to next term.	Dec 28, 1968 – Jan 3, 1987	Democratic	Thomas Eagleton (St. Louis)	25
13	Stuart Symington (St. Louis)	Democratic	Jan 3, 1953 – Dec 27, 1976	Elected in 1964.	25	91st	26	Elected in 1968.	Dec 28, 1968 – Jan 3, 1987	Democratic	Thomas Eagleton (St. Louis)	25
13	Stuart Symington (St. Louis)	Democratic	Jan 3, 1953 – Dec 27, 1976	Elected in 1970. Retired, then resigned early to give successor preferential seniority.	26	92nd	26	Elected in 1968.	Dec 28, 1968 – Jan 3, 1987	Democratic	Thomas Eagleton (St. Louis)	25
13	Stuart Symington (St. Louis)	Democratic	Jan 3, 1953 – Dec 27, 1976	Elected in 1970. Retired, then resigned early to give successor preferential seniority.	26	93rd	26	Elected in 1968.	Dec 28, 1968 – Jan 3, 1987	Democratic	Thomas Eagleton (St. Louis)	25
13	Stuart Symington (St. Louis)	Democratic	Jan 3, 1953 – Dec 27, 1976	Elected in 1970. Retired, then resigned early to give successor preferential seniority.	26	94th	27	Re-elected in 1974.	Dec 28, 1968 – Jan 3, 1987	Democratic	Thomas Eagleton (St. Louis)	25
14	John Danforth (Newburg)	Republican	Dec 27, 1976 – Jan 3, 1995	Appointed to finish Symington's term, having already been elected to the next term.	26	94th	27	Re-elected in 1974.	Dec 28, 1968 – Jan 3, 1987	Democratic	Thomas Eagleton (St. Louis)	25
14	John Danforth (Newburg)	Republican	Dec 27, 1976 – Jan 3, 1995	Elected in 1976.	27	95th	27	Re-elected in 1974.	Dec 28, 1968 – Jan 3, 1987	Democratic	Thomas Eagleton (St. Louis)	25
14	John Danforth (Newburg)	Republican	Dec 27, 1976 – Jan 3, 1995	Elected in 1976.	27	96th	27	Re-elected in 1974.	Dec 28, 1968 – Jan 3, 1987	Democratic	Thomas Eagleton (St. Louis)	25
14	John Danforth (Newburg)	Republican	Dec 27, 1976 – Jan 3, 1995	Elected in 1976.	27	97th	28	Re-elected in 1980. Retired.	Dec 28, 1968 – Jan 3, 1987	Democratic	Thomas Eagleton (St. Louis)	25
14	John Danforth (Newburg)	Republican	Dec 27, 1976 – Jan 3, 1995	Re-elected in 1982.	28	98th	28	Re-elected in 1980. Retired.	Dec 28, 1968 – Jan 3, 1987	Democratic	Thomas Eagleton (St. Louis)	25
14	John Danforth (Newburg)	Republican	Dec 27, 1976 – Jan 3, 1995	Re-elected in 1982.	28	99th	28	Re-elected in 1980. Retired.	Dec 28, 1968 – Jan 3, 1987	Democratic	Thomas Eagleton (St. Louis)	25
14	John Danforth (Newburg)	Republican	Dec 27, 1976 – Jan 3, 1995	Re-elected in 1982.	28	100th	29	Elected in 1986.	Jan 3, 1987 – Jan 3, 2011	Republican	Kit Bond (Mexico)	26
14	John Danforth (Newburg)	Republican	Dec 27, 1976 – Jan 3, 1995	Re-elected in 1988. Retired.	29	101st	29	Elected in 1986.	Jan 3, 1987 – Jan 3, 2011	Republican	Kit Bond (Mexico)	26
14	John Danforth (Newburg)	Republican	Dec 27, 1976 – Jan 3, 1995	Re-elected in 1988. Retired.	29	102nd	29	Elected in 1986.	Jan 3, 1987 – Jan 3, 2011	Republican	Kit Bond (Mexico)	26
14	John Danforth (Newburg)	Republican	Dec 27, 1976 – Jan 3, 1995	Re-elected in 1988. Retired.	29	103rd	30	Re-elected in 1992.	Jan 3, 1987 – Jan 3, 2011	Republican	Kit Bond (Mexico)	26
15	John Ashcroft (Willard)	Republican	Jan 3, 1995 – Jan 3, 2001	Elected in 1994. Lost re-election.	30	104th	30	Re-elected in 1992.	Jan 3, 1987 – Jan 3, 2011	Republican	Kit Bond (Mexico)	26
15	John Ashcroft (Willard)	Republican	Jan 3, 1995 – Jan 3, 2001	Elected in 1994. Lost re-election.	30	105th	30	Re-elected in 1992.	Jan 3, 1987 – Jan 3, 2011	Republican	Kit Bond (Mexico)	26
15	John Ashcroft (Willard)	Republican	Jan 3, 1995 – Jan 3, 2001	Elected in 1994. Lost re-election.	30	106th	31	Re-elected in 1998.	Jan 3, 1987 – Jan 3, 2011	Republican	Kit Bond (Mexico)	26
16	Jean Carnahan (Rolla)	Democratic	Jan 3, 2001 – Nov 23, 2002	Appointed to begin the term of her husband, Mel Carnahan (D), who was posthumously elected in 2000. Lost election to finish her husband's term.	31	107th	31	Re-elected in 1998.	Jan 3, 1987 – Jan 3, 2011	Republican	Kit Bond (Mexico)	26
17	Jim Talent (Chesterfield)	Republican	Nov 23, 2002 – Jan 3, 2007	Elected in 2002 to finish Mel Carnahan's term. Lost re-election.	31	107th	31	Re-elected in 1998.	Jan 3, 1987 – Jan 3, 2011	Republican	Kit Bond (Mexico)	26
17	Jim Talent (Chesterfield)	Republican	Nov 23, 2002 – Jan 3, 2007	Elected in 2002 to finish Mel Carnahan's term. Lost re-election.	31	108th	31	Re-elected in 1998.	Jan 3, 1987 – Jan 3, 2011	Republican	Kit Bond (Mexico)	26
17	Jim Talent (Chesterfield)	Republican	Nov 23, 2002 – Jan 3, 2007	Elected in 2002 to finish Mel Carnahan's term. Lost re-election.	31	109th	32	Re-elected in 2004. Retired.	Jan 3, 1987 – Jan 3, 2011	Republican	Kit Bond (Mexico)	26
18	Claire McCaskill (St. Louis)	Democratic	Jan 3, 2007 – Jan 3, 2019	Elected in 2006.	32	110th	32	Re-elected in 2004. Retired.	Jan 3, 1987 – Jan 3, 2011	Republican	Kit Bond (Mexico)	26
18	Claire McCaskill (St. Louis)	Democratic	Jan 3, 2007 – Jan 3, 2019	Elected in 2006.	32	111th	32	Re-elected in 2004. Retired.	Jan 3, 1987 – Jan 3, 2011	Republican	Kit Bond (Mexico)	26
18	Claire McCaskill (St. Louis)	Democratic	Jan 3, 2007 – Jan 3, 2019	Elected in 2006.	32	112th	33	Elected in 2010.	Jan 3, 2011 – Jan 3, 2023	Republican	Roy Blunt (Springfield)	27
18	Claire McCaskill (St. Louis)	Democratic	Jan 3, 2007 – Jan 3, 2019	Re-elected in 2012. Lost re-election.	33	113th	33	Elected in 2010.	Jan 3, 2011 – Jan 3, 2023	Republican	Roy Blunt (Springfield)	27
18	Claire McCaskill (St. Louis)	Democratic	Jan 3, 2007 – Jan 3, 2019	Re-elected in 2012. Lost re-election.	33	114th	33	Elected in 2010.	Jan 3, 2011 – Jan 3, 2023	Republican	Roy Blunt (Springfield)	27
18	Claire McCaskill (St. Louis)	Democratic	Jan 3, 2007 – Jan 3, 2019	Re-elected in 2012. Lost re-election.	33	115th	34	Re-elected in 2016. Retired.	Jan 3, 2011 – Jan 3, 2023	Republican	Roy Blunt (Springfield)	27
19	Josh Hawley (Ozark)	Republican	Jan 3, 2019 – present	Elected in 2018.	34	116th	34	Re-elected in 2016. Retired.	Jan 3, 2011 – Jan 3, 2023	Republican	Roy Blunt (Springfield)	27
19	Josh Hawley (Ozark)	Republican	Jan 3, 2019 – present	Elected in 2018.	34	117th	34	Re-elected in 2016. Retired.	Jan 3, 2011 – Jan 3, 2023	Republican	Roy Blunt (Springfield)	27
19	Josh Hawley (Ozark)	Republican	Jan 3, 2019 – present	Elected in 2018.	34	118th	35	Elected in 2022.	Jan 3, 2023 – present	Republican	Eric Schmitt (Glendale)	28
19	Josh Hawley (Ozark)	Republican	Jan 3, 2019 – present	Re-elected in 2024.	35	119th	35	Elected in 2022.	Jan 3, 2023 – present	Republican	Eric Schmitt (Glendale)	28
19	Josh Hawley (Ozark)	Republican	Jan 3, 2019 – present	Re-elected in 2024.	35	120th	35	Elected in 2022.	Jan 3, 2023 – present	Republican	Eric Schmitt (Glendale)	28
19	Josh Hawley (Ozark)	Republican	Jan 3, 2019 – present	Re-elected in 2024.	35	121st	36	To be determined in the 2028 election.				
To be determined in the 2030 election.					36	122nd	36	To be determined in the 2028 election.				

== See also ==
- Elections in Missouri
- List of United States representatives from Missouri
- Missouri's congressional delegations
