= William Gillock =

American composer of pedagogical piano music

William L Gillock (July 1, 1917 – September 7, 1993) was an American music educator noted for his many pedagogical piano compositions. Because of the melodic strength of his music, he has sometimes been called "the Schubert of children's composers".

== Life ==
Gillock was born in La Russell, Missouri and began taking an interest in the piano from the age of three. He studied art at Central Methodist College, where his music teacher was Nannie Louise Wright. After graduating he moved to New Orleans, setting up his own teaching studio there. He later moved again to Dallas, where he concentrated on composing and adjudicating.

Gillock received multiple honours from the National Federation of Music Clubs, and his teaching pieces gained widespread popularity beyond the US, especially in Japan and Germany. He died in Dallas on September 7, 1993.

== Music ==
Gillock wrote over 300 pieces of pedagogical piano music, brief works with engaging titles and in many different historic and geographic styles. They are still widely available in modern editions, and regularly included in collections of graded pieces issued by the music examination boards.

His most productive period as a composer was between 1956 and 1969. Notable collections include the three volumes of New Orleans Jazz Styles, the eight volume (51 pieces) Accent on series (such as Accent on Duets, Accent on Solos and Accent on the Seasons), and the multi-volume Piano All the Way method.

More extended works include the four movement Little Suite in Baroque Style, which provides an introduction to contrapuntal playing (unusual in early-level pieces) and might be used as a bridge to Handel's keyboard suites. Similarly (although for more advanced players) Gillock composed the three movement Sonatine in Classic Style (1963), and the Lyric Preludes in Romantic Style (24 pieces in all keys, 1958).

Well-known individual short pieces, mostly for beginning and intermediate players, include Aeolian Harp, Autumn is Here, Carnival in Rio (originally for two pianos), the impressionistic Fountain in the Rain (1960, said to have been his best-selling composition), Goldfish (1964), Happy Holiday, Holiday in Spain, New Orleans Nightfall, On a Paris Boulevard, and The Prowling Pussy Cat.
