= James P. Kem =

American politician (1890–1965)

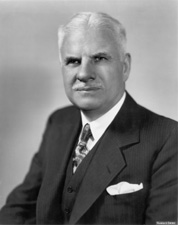

United States Senator from Missouri
- In office January 3, 1947 – January 3, 1953
- Preceded by: Frank P. Briggs
- Succeeded by: Stuart Symington

Personal details
- Born: James Preston Kem; April 2, 1890 Macon, Missouri, US
- Died: February 24, 1965 (aged 74) Charlottesville, Virginia, US
- Party: Republican

James Preston Kem (April 2, 1890 – February 24, 1965) was an American politician representing Missouri in the United States Senate from 1947 to 1953.

== Life and career ==
James P. Kem was born in Macon, Missouri. He attended Blees Military Academy, then graduated from the University of Missouri in 1910, and Harvard Law School in 1913. He was admitted to the bar in 1913 and commenced practice in Kansas City, Missouri. He entered the U.S. Army infantry in 1917 and was a World War I veteran. In 1920, Kem resumed the general practice of law in Kansas City. He built up a very successful corporate practice over the next two decades. By 1943, he served as President of the Lawyers Association of Kansas City and as chairman of the Jackson County Republican Committee. In 1944, he served as a delegate to the Republican National Convention and began building support for a run for the U.S. Senate. Kem defeated incumbent Frank P. Briggs, who had been appointed to the office in 1945 when Harry S. Truman resigned to become vice president.

During his one term in the Senate, Kem was a staunch opponent of President Truman, characterizing him as a puppet of Tom Pendergast's corrupt political machine in Kansas City. Kem lost his re-election bid in 1952 to Democratic nominee Stuart Symington, a former Emerson Electric CEO who had been United States Secretary of the Air Force in the Truman administration. Kem retired to a Washington, D.C. law practice and then raised Angus cattle in Virginia until his death in 1965 at the age of 74.

Party political offices
Preceded by Manvel H. Davis	Republican nominee for U.S. Senator from Missouri (Class 1); 1946, 1952	Succeeded by Hazel Palmer
U.S. Senate
Preceded by Frank P. Briggs	U.S. senator (Class 1) from Missouri; 1947–1953; Served alongside: Forrest C. Donnell, Thomas C. Hennings, Jr.	Succeeded by Stuart Symington
