= William Fletcher McMurry =

American bishop (1864–1934)

William Fletcher McMurry (June 29, 1864 – January 17, 1934) was an American bishop of the Methodist Episcopal Church, South, elected in 1918. Prior to his episcopal service, the Rev. McMurry also was notable as a Methodist pastor and church official.

William was born in Shelby County, Missouri, the son of the Rev. William Wesley and Mary Elizabeth Williams McMurry. William F. married Miss Francis B. Davis in 1888. McMurry graduated from Shelby High School.

He was then educated at St. Charles College in Saint Charles, Missouri and at Central Methodist College in Fayette, Missouri. His D.D. was from Emory and Henry College in Virginia.

In 1887 Rev. W.F. McMurry was admitted on trial in the Missouri Annual Conference. He was appointed pastor at St. Joseph, Missouri for three years. He next was appointed to Macon (1890–94) and Richmond (1894-98). He was appointed presiding elder of the St. Joseph District (1898-1901). He then transferred to the St. Louis Annual Conference, where he was appointed presiding elder of the St. Louis District (1901–02) before being appointed pastor of Centenary Methodist Church in St. Louis (1902–06). His final appointment before his election to the episcopacy was as Corresponding Secretary of the Board of Church Extension of the M.E. Church, South (1906–18). William Fletcher McMurry was elected to the episcopacy of the Methodist Episcopal Church, South by its 1918 General Conference.

Bishop McMurry received the honorary degree of Doctor of Divinity from the Central Methodist College. McMurry University in Abilene, Texas was named in his honor.

He died on January 17, 1934, of a heart attack.

== See also ==
- List of bishops of the United Methodist Church
