= Nannie Louise Wright =

American composer, pianist and teacher

- Born: June 30, 1879; Fayette, Missouri, US
- Died: March 16, 1958 (aged 78)
- Occupations: Dean, professor, pianist
- Known for: First dean of the Swinney Conservatory

Academic background
- Education: Howard-Payne College; Columbia School of Music (BM)

Academic work
- Institutions: Howard-Payne College, Central Methodist University

Nannie Louise Wright (June 30, 1879 – March 16, 1958) was an American composer, pianist, and music educator born in Fayette, Missouri. She graduated from Howard-Payne Junior College in Fayette and the Columbia School of Music in Chicago, Illinois. Wright studied piano with Mary Wood Chase in Chicago and with Josef Lhévinne in Berlin. She returned to Fayette to become the Director of Music at Howard- Payne College in 1909. Later, she served as President of the Missouri State Music Teachers' Association and as Dean of Music at Central Methodist University's Swinney Conservatory of Music in Fayette, where one of her students was William Gillock.

== Early life ==
Wright was one of five children of Dr. Uriel Sebree Wright and Carrie Shafroth Wright. At the age of five, she started piano lessons from her mother. At the age of ten, her piano skills were advanced enough that she succeeded her late mother as organist at the First Baptist Church of Fayette.

== Career ==
After graduations, Wright returned to Howard-Payne to teach. She eventually succeeded Marion Eloise Lasher as director of instrumental music in 1906. In this position, the music department at Howard-Payne expanded to include more music history, theory, and violin courses, and its first Bachelor of Music degree. Wright continued to work through Howard-Payne's merger with Central College, (later named Central Methodist College and then Central Methodist University), becoming the first dean of the Swinney Conservatory.

== Works ==
=== Orchestra ===
- Piano Concerto, opus 42 (also arranged for two pianos)

=== Piano ===
- Acrobatic Stunts (1949)
- Air de Ballet
- American Indian Sketches, opus 63 (1921)
- A Spanish Serenade (1929)
- At Evening, opus 38
- Autumn, Winter, Spring
- The Banjo, opus 74, No. 4 (1920)
- Banjo Picker
- Bee and the Clover
- Bell
- Bells Across the Valley (1953)
- Birds, opus 36, No. 3
- Circus Parade, opus 30, No. 1
- Concert Study in C Major (1924)
- Dance of the Brownies, opus 98, No. 2
- Glory to God (1953)
- Grandmother's Minuet, opus 98, No. 1
- Happy and Gay (1949)
- Hop, Skip and Play (1953)
- Humoresque
- Ice Skating (1949)
- In Springtime, opus 36
- Jaunty Ride (1949)
- Juggler
- March, opus 22
- March of the Boy Scouts, opus 74, No. 1
- Melody in e minor (1949)
- Miniature Etudes, opus 71
- Night Song
- Orchard Swing (1942)
- Pieces, opus 24
- Plantation Dance, opus 98, No. 3
- Prelude in C Major (1929)
- Prelude in Eb Major (1930)
- Roller Coaster (1953)
- Rondo, opus 4, No. 1
- Scarf Dance
- Scherzo (1953)
- Serenade, opus 14
- Seven Melodious Pieces
- Six Little Pieces, opus 24
- The Band, op. 20, no. 1 (1924)
- The Butterfly: from Springtime (1919)
- Thoughts at Twilight (1949)
- Twelve Etudes for the pianoforte (1915)
- Twelve Preludes, opus 25 (1915)
- Valse Poetique (1953)
- Veil Dance
- Venetian Serenade
- Waltz

=== Books ===
This is a list of known method, instruction, and study books written by Wright.

- In Toyland: Six Short Teaching Pieces for the Piano (1918)
- Pieces for the Development of Technique (1935)
- Studies for Melody and Phrasing: For the Piano, opus 90 (1921)
- The Music Scrap Book: A Kindergarten Method for Piano Beginners (1925)
- The Very First Pieces Played on Keyboard (1927)
