= Dan W. Dodson =

American sociology professor (1907–1995)

- Born: April 8, 1907; Franklin County, Texas, U.S.
- Died: August 5, 1995 (aged 88); Austin, Texas, U.S.
- Spouse: Evelyn Foreman (m. 1937)
- Children: Dan Dodson Jr.

Academic background
- Education: McMurry College; Southern Methodist University

Academic work
- Discipline: Sociology
- Institutions: New York University

Daniel William Dodson Sr. (April 8, 1907 – August 5, 1995) was an American sociology professor, a supporter of civil rights, and a critic of segregation in education.

== Early life ==
Dodson was born on April 8, 1907, in Panther's Chapel, Texas, the son of a sharecropper. He received his bachelor's degree at McMurry College, in Abilene, Texas. He later received his graduate degree from Southern Methodist University.

== Career ==
In 1936, Dodson became a sociology professor at New York University. He received early schooling at his local Methodist church. Dodson was influential in working to break the color barrier in baseball, working closely with Branch Rickey to hire Jackie Robinson in 1946. He retired as professor of sociology in 1972, and returned to Texas that same year.

== Personal life ==
He married his wife Evelyn Foreman on June 9, 1937, in Dallas, Texas. Dodson died on August 5, 1995, in Austin, Texas. He was survived by his wife and his son, Dan Jr.

== Public appearances ==
Dodson is the narrator in the documentary, Crisis in Levittown, PA.

== Quotes ==
"It is now clear that not only does prejudice produce segregation, but segregation produces prejudice."

"Most of us accept current prejudices when we're not exposed to the facts, but I gradually dropped them as I learned the facts."
