= 1952 United States Senate election in Missouri =

- November 4, 1952
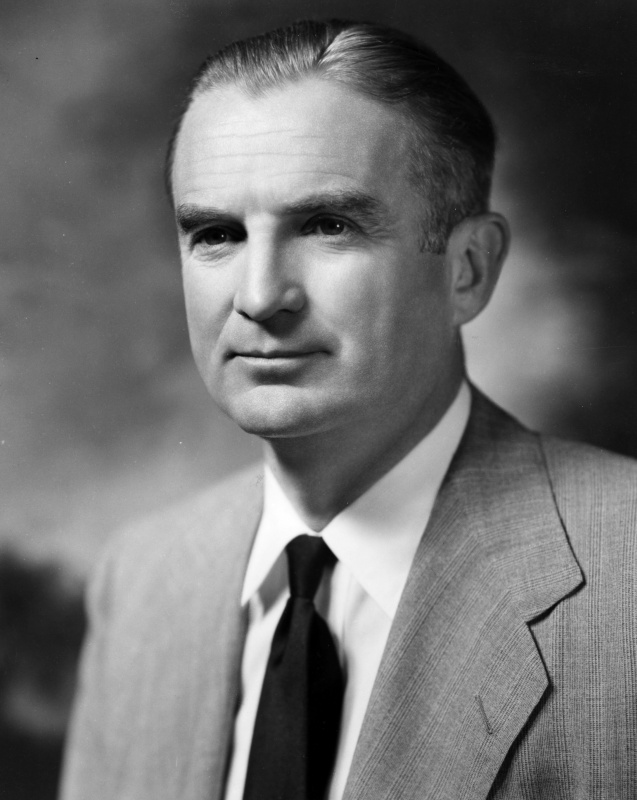

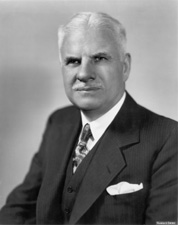
Nominee	Stuart Symington	James P. Kem
Party	Democratic	Republican
Popular vote	1,008,521	858,170
Percentage	53.99%	45.94%
- County results Symington: 50–60% 60–70% 70–80% Kem: 50–60% 60–70% 70–80% 80–90%
U.S. senator before election
James P. Kem
Republican
Elected U.S. Senator
Stuart Symington
Democratic

The 1952 United States Senate election in Missouri was held on November 4, 1952.

Incumbent Republican Senator James P. Kem ran for re-election to a second term in office, but was defeated by Secretary of the Air Force Stuart Symington.

== Republican primary ==
=== Candidates ===
- Herman G. Grosby
- James P. Kem, incumbent Senator since 1947
- William McKinley Thomas, perennial candidate

=== Results ===
1952 Republican U.S. Senate primary
Party	Candidate	Votes	%
Republican	James P. Kem (incumbent)	304,191	84.63%
Republican	William McKinley Thomas	39,531	10.96%
Republican	Herman G. Grosby	16,974	4.71%
Total votes		360,696	100.00%

== Democratic primary ==
=== Candidates ===
- John A. Johnson, State Senator from Ellington
- Stuart Symington, U.S. Secretary of the Air Force
- J.E. "Buck" Taylor, Missouri Attorney General

=== Results ===
1952 Democratic U.S. Senate primary
Party	Candidate	Votes	%
Democratic	Stuart Symington	368,595	62.09%
Democratic	Buck Taylor	180,849	30.46%
Democratic	John A. Johnson	44,216	7.45%
Total votes		593,660	100.00%

== General election ==
=== Results ===
1952 U.S. Senate election in Missouri
Party	Candidate	Votes	%	±%
Democratic	Stuart Symington	1,008,521	53.99%	▲6.90
Republican	James P. Kem (incumbent)	858,170	45.94%	▼6.77
Progressive	Haven P. Perkins	883	0.05%	N/A
Socialist	Joseph G. Hodges	219	0.01%	▼0.07
Christian Nationalist	Christian Frederick	161	0.01%	N/A
Socialist Labor	Henry W. Genck	145	0.01%	▼0.02
Total votes		1,868,099	100.00%	

== See also ==
- 1952 United States Senate elections
