= Keith E. House =

American musician (1926–2005)

Keith E. House (1926–2005) was an American music educator and director of bands.

== Early life ==
Born, raised, and educated in Sweet Springs, Missouri. House received his B.M.E. from Central Methodist University in trumpet. His graduate studies were pursued at the University of Kansas.

== Educational background ==
Dean (1984–1995), Professor and Director of Bands (1972–1995), Swinney Conservatory of Music, Central Methodist University, Fayette, Missouri. Member of the American Bandmasters Association and the Missouri Bandmasters Association Authority on marches written for band; Conductor on numerous recordings in the Heritage of the March series. His authority led him to host a weekly hour program on Missouri Public Radio showcasing extensive band literature. From the late 1950s until 1972, Dr. House taught high school band at Lee's Summit High School in Lee's Summit, Missouri. He also directed numerous community bands in the area, including the Unity Band and the Kansas City American Legion Band. From 1989 until his death in 2005 he conducted the Columbia Community Band in Columbia, Missouri. He also maintained a private studio for the study of trumpet. He inspired many successful professional musicians and music educators, including the jazz artist Pat Metheny.
