= Danielle Moore =

American politician

Danielle Moore (born June 24, 1946) is a former schoolteacher and Republican member of the Missouri House of Representatives. She resides in Fulton, Missouri, with her husband, Lisle H. Moore, Jr. They have two children, Melinda Ann Henry and Lisle H. Moore III.

She was born in Paris, France, and later moved to the United States. She is a graduate of Elsberry High School in Lincoln County, Missouri. She received a B.A. in French and English from Central Methodist College in 1968 and went on to be a schoolteacher.

She is a member of St. Peter's Catholic Church, the NAACP, the Fulton Rotary Club, the National Order of Women Legislators, the Missouri Federation of Republican Women, Callaway County Federated Republican Women, the National Association of Sportsmen Legislators, the National Rifle Association of America, VFW Post 2657 Auxiliary, Callaway Farm Bureau, Kingdom of Callaway Retired Teachers Association, Delta Kappa Gamma Society International, the Callaway County Red Cross Executive Advisory Board, the Missouri Retired Teachers Association, and is a member of the board of the Missouri Literacy Association and of the Fulton Area Development Corps.

She was first elected to the Missouri House of Representatives in 2000, and won re-election in 2002, 2004 and 2006. She is a member of the following committees:

- Appropriations - Public Health and Corrections (chair)
- Budget
- Elementary and Secondary Education

Following the decision of Kenny Hulshof to step down at the end of his term as congressman of Missouri's 9th congressional district (in order to run for governor), Moore announced her candidacy for the Republican nomination to replace Hulshof. Moore lost the Republican primary to eventual victor Blaine Luetkemeyer.
