= Virgil E. Bottom =

Virgil Eldon Bottom (6 January 1911 – 30 October 2003) was an American experimental physicist whose work contributed to the development of quartz crystal production in the United States during World War II and up to the end of the Cold War. Bottom was also recognized for his teaching ability and humanitarian work.

== Early life and education ==
Born in Butler County, Kansas, Virgil grew to have a fondness for mathematics and mathematical science. In 1931, he received his AB degree in mathematics from Friends University where he is listed as a distinguished alumnus. He then moved to the University of Michigan where in 1938 he would receive an MS. After the interruption of World War II to his education plans, Bottom received his PhD in physics from Purdue University.

== Military service ==
During World War II, Bottom was assigned to the Signal Corps Engineering Laboratory where he spent most of his time repairing radios. He was recognized for his efforts by being awarded the Certificate of Service by the Signal Corps Engineering Laboratory. It was during his military service that Bottom gained experience in quartz crystals which set the path for his physics career.

== Awards in physics ==
For his work on the piezoelectric effect of quartz crystals Bottom received both the Cady Award and Sawyer Award from the IEEE.

== Teaching ==
Bottom was recognized in the field of physics education with 20 of his students following him into the field of piezoelectrics involving quartz crystals. From 1964 to 1965, he was a Fulbright Lecturer in Brazil. Bottom also traveled the world to give lectures on crystal quartz production. During his career he would hold lecturing positions in math and physics at Friends University, Wichita, Kansas, at Colorado State University, Fort Collins, Colorado and at McMurry College.

== Humanitarian work and later life ==
Bottom was a deeply religious man and spent his free time translating Bible verses and working as a volunteer at rehabilitation clinics. In 1985 he was recognized for 25 years of service to the West Texas Rehab, in Abilene, Texas. Bottom spent the remainder of his retirement years in Abilene where he died 30 October 2003.

== Publications ==
- Virgil E. Bottom, Introduction to Quartz Crystal Unit Design, Van Nostrand Reinhold, (1982).
- Virgil E. Bottom, The Autobiography of Virgil E. Bottom, IEEE.
- Virgil E. Bottom, A History Of The Quartz Crystal Industry In The USA, IEEE, (1981)
