= Stuart Symington =

American politician (1901–1988)

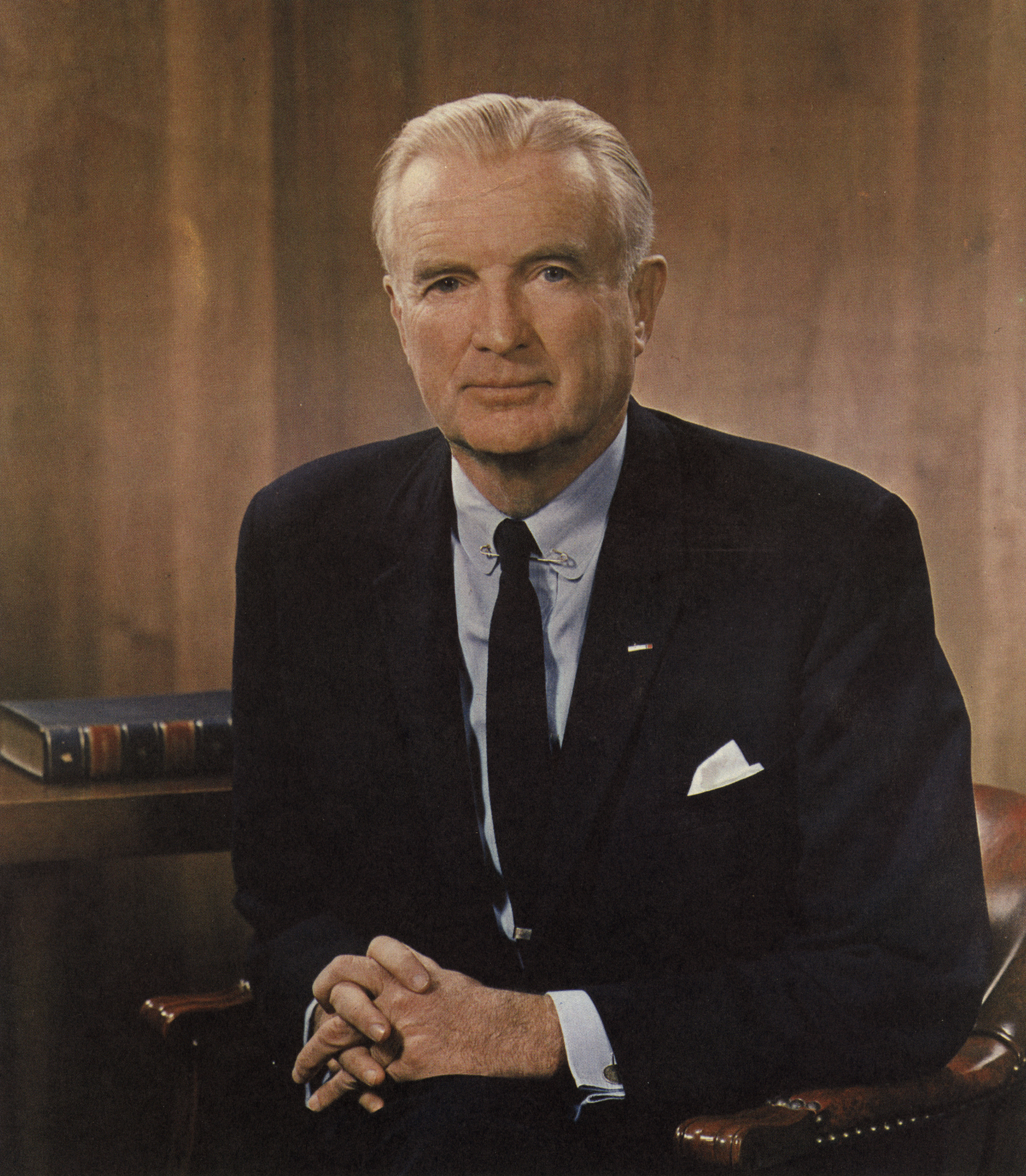
- Symington c. 1971–1976

United States Senator from Missouri
- In office January 3, 1953 – December 27, 1976
- Preceded by: James P. Kem
- Succeeded by: John Danforth

1st United States Secretary of the Air Force
- In office September 18, 1947 – April 24, 1950
- President: Harry S. Truman
- Preceded by: Himself (Assistant Secretary of War for Air)
- Succeeded by: Thomas K. Finletter

3rd Assistant Secretary of War for Air
- In office January 3, 1946 – September 18, 1947
- President: Harry S. Truman
- Preceded by: Robert A. Lovett
- Succeeded by: Himself (Secretary of the Air Force)

Personal details
- Born: William Stuart Symington III; June 26, 1901 Amherst, Massachusetts, U.S.
- Died: December 14, 1988 (aged 87) New Canaan, Connecticut, U.S.
- Resting place: Washington National Cathedral
- Party: Democratic
- Spouses: Evelyn Wadsworth (m. 1924; died 1972); Ann Hemingway Watson (m. 1978)
- Relatives: Symington family
- Education: Yale University (BA)

Military service
- Allegiance: United States
- Branch: United States Army
- Service years: 1918–1919
- Rank: Second Lieutenant
- Unit: 84th Division
- Conflict: World War I

William Stuart Symington III (/ˈsaɪmɪŋtən/ SY-ming-tən; June 26, 1901 – December 14, 1988) was an American businessman and Democratic politician from Missouri. He served as the first secretary of the Air Force from 1947 to 1950 and was a United States senator from Missouri from 1953 to 1976.

Born in Amherst, Massachusetts, Symington worked as an executive in his uncle's iron products company and for other companies before becoming president of Emerson Electric. He resigned from Emerson in 1945 to take various positions in the administration of President Harry S. Truman, becoming the first Secretary of the Air Force in 1947. He was elected to the Senate in 1952, defeating incumbent Republican Senator James P. Kem. He joined the United States Senate Armed Services Committee and the United States Senate Committee on Foreign Relations, and emerged as a prominent critic of McCarthyism.

Symington sought the Democratic nomination in the 1960 presidential election with the backing of former President Harry S. Truman, but the nomination went to John F. Kennedy. After the Kansas City Athletics moved to Oakland, Symington threatened to revoke Major League Baseball's antitrust exemption, which in turn encouraged the formation of the Kansas City Royals. Symington declined to seek re-election in 1976 and was succeeded by John Danforth.

== Education and business career ==
Symington was born in Amherst, Massachusetts, the son of Emily Kuhn (née Harrison) and William Stuart Symington Jr. His father, who received a Ph.D in French literature, was a Romance languages professor at Stanford and Amherst College before pursuing a law career and becoming a judge in Baltimore, Maryland. His mother came from a prominent Maryland family. Symington grew up in Baltimore, and was the oldest of his five brothers and sisters. Symington attended Roland Park Public School and the Gilman School, a private all-male preparatory school in Baltimore's Roland Park neighborhood. He graduated from Baltimore City College in 1918, and at the age of 17, Symington enlisted in the United States Army as a private first class during World War I.

Stationed in an Officer Training Program at Camp Zachary Taylor in Louisville, Kentucky, Symington was never deployed to fight in World War I, with the war ending before he could seek deployment. Symington was commissioned as a second lieutenant, becoming one of the youngest members of the Army to achieve that rank; being discharged as a second lieutenant in January 1919.

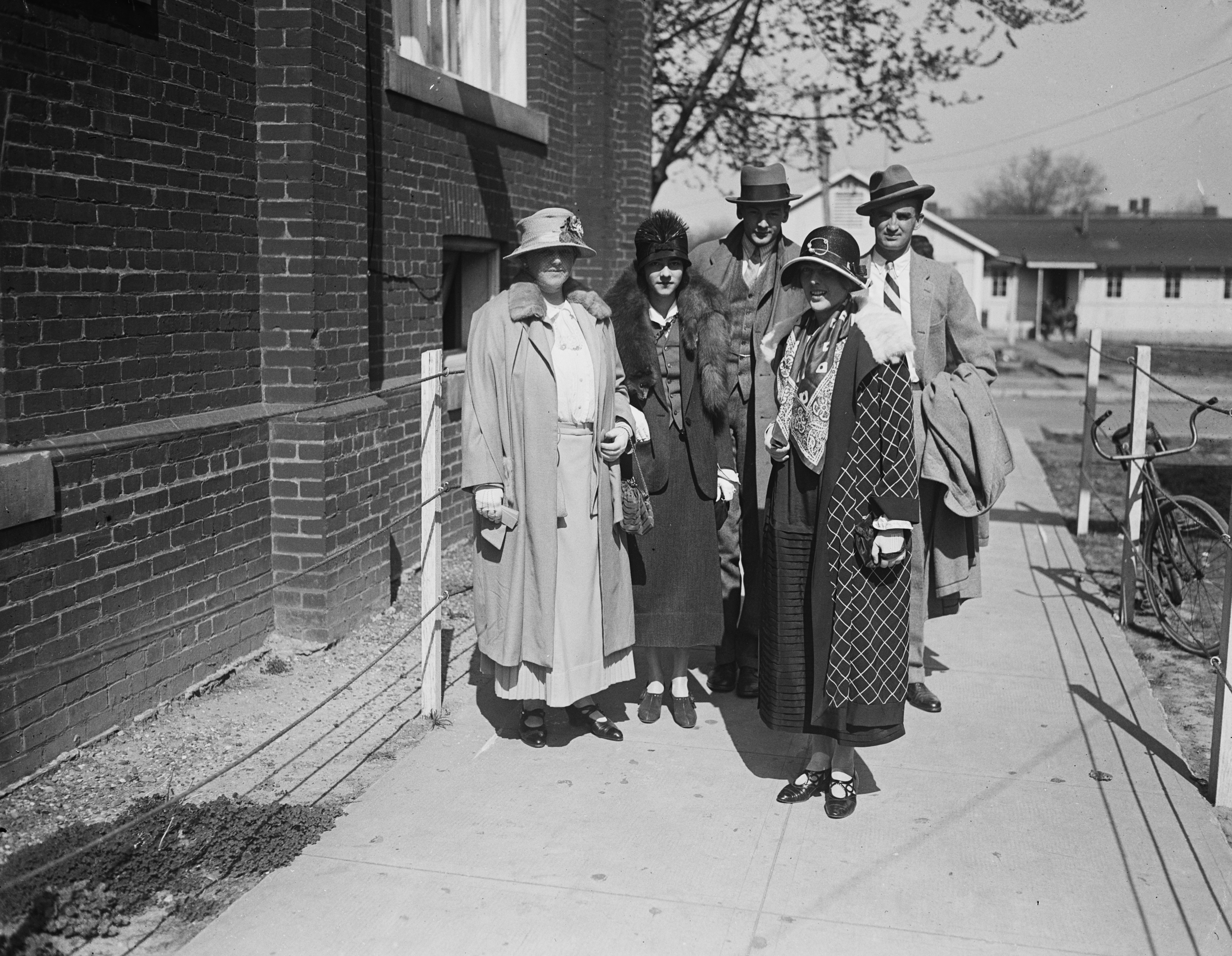
Symington (back, right) with his wife Evelyn (front, right) and his in-laws at Fort Myer, Virginia, April 23, 1924

He graduated from Yale University in 1923. At Yale he was a member of Delta Kappa Epsilon fraternity (Phi chapter), the Elihu senior society, and served on the board of the Yale Daily News. In 1924, he married the former Evelyn Wadsworth in a lavish ceremony attended by President Coolidge and other prominent politicians. By all accounts, the two had a very happy marriage and were known for their devotion and faithfulness to each other, both of which were not always present among the social elite. When Evelyn died in 1972, Symington was devastated, telling his biographer that "he never knew this much loneliness could be around."

In 1923, Symington went to work for an uncle in the shops of the Symington Company of Rochester, New York, manufacturers of malleable iron products. Two years later he formed Eastern Clay Products but in 1927 returned to the Symington Company as executive assistant to the president.

Symington resigned in 1930 to become President of the Colonial Radio Corporation. In January 1935, he accepted the presidency of Rustless Iron and Steel Corporation (manufacturers of stainless steel) but remained a director of Colonial Radio Corporation.

When Rustless Iron and Steel Corporation was sold to the American Rolling Mill Company in 1937, Symington resigned and in 1938 accepted the presidency of Emerson Electric Company in St. Louis, Missouri. During World War II he transformed the company into the world's largest builder of airplane gun turrets. Symington, who was an active proponent of racial justice ("All Americans should have their chance") integrated the Emerson Electric work force, which resulted in increased productivity.

== First Secretary of the Air Force ==
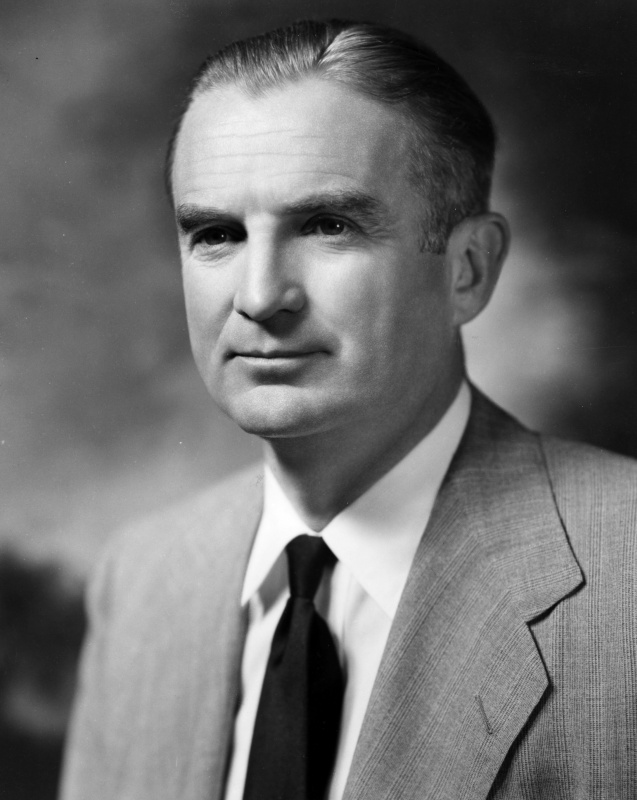
Symington c. 1947–1950

He resigned from Emerson in 1945 to join the administration of fellow Missourian Harry S. Truman. His first positions were chairman of the Surplus Property Board (1945), administrator of the Property Administration (1945–1946) and Assistant Secretary of War for Air (1946–1947).

On September 18, 1947, the Office of the Secretary of the Air Force was created and Symington became the first secretary. Symington had a stormy term as he worked to win respect for the United States Air Force, which previously had been part of the Army. He had numerous public battles with Secretary of Defense James Forrestal.

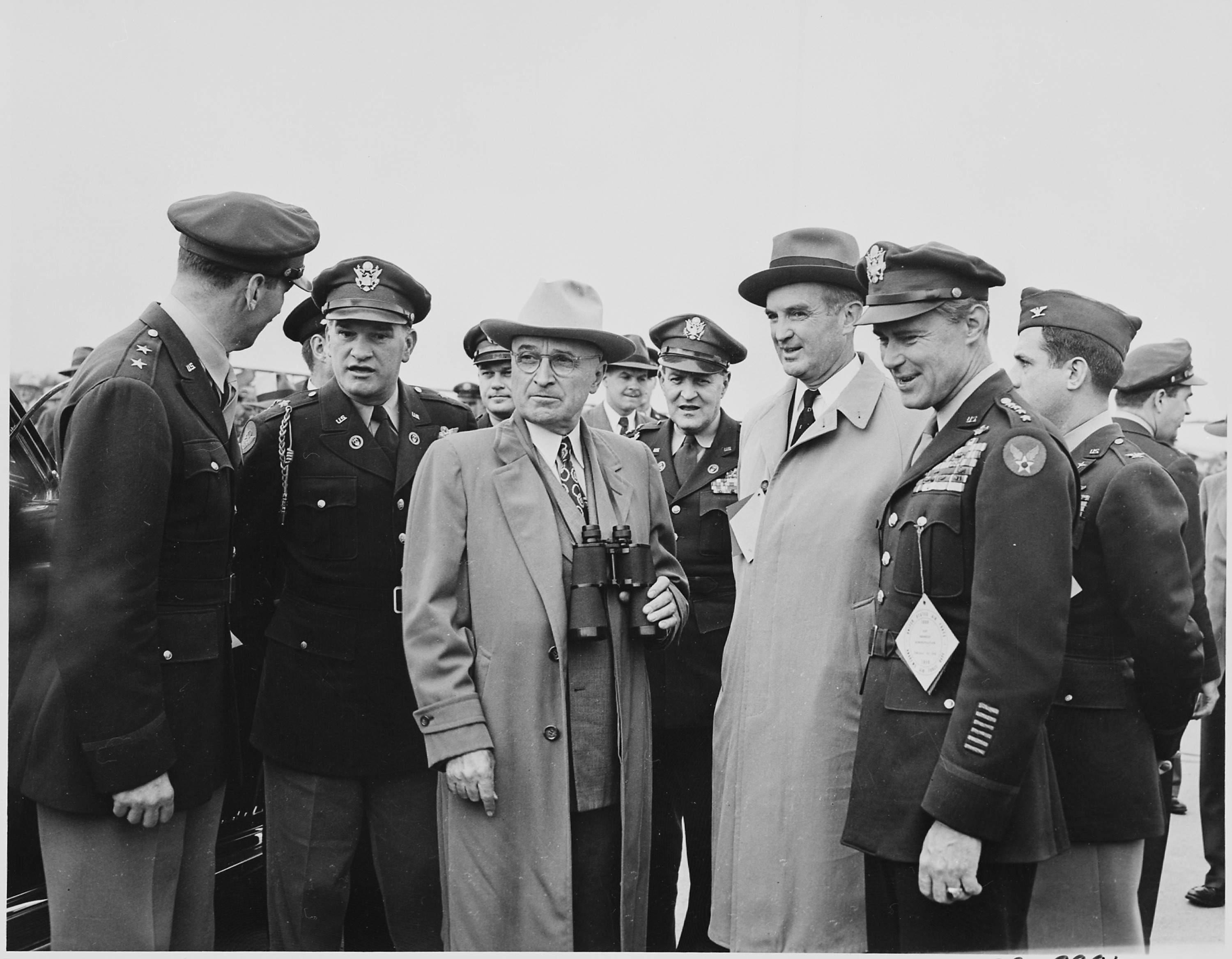
Symington (in trenchcoat, right) with President Harry S. Truman and several military officers at an air show at Andrews Air Force Base, February 15, 1949

Major accomplishments during Symington's term as Secretary included the Berlin Airlift and championing the United States Air Force Academy. Symington resigned in 1950 to protest lack of funding for the Air Force after the USSR detonated its first nuclear weapon. He remained in the administration as the Chairman of the National Security Resources Board (1950–1951) and the Chairman of the Reconstruction Finance Corporation Administrator (1951–1952). He was featured on the cover of Time magazine's January 19, 1948 issue.

=== Cancellation of the Flying Wing ===
During his tenure, there was a major debate and investigation into production of the Convair B-36 Peacemaker, which was the last piston-powered bomber at the beginning of the Jet Age. During his tenure, Symington had a meeting with John K. Northrop on the contract for the YB-49 Flying Wing bomber, which was well underway with seven examples manufactured. During this meeting, Symington threatened Northrop that if they refused to enter into a corporate merger with Convair (the company building the rival B-36 Peacemaker bomber) that Northrop would be, "Goddamn sorry if you don't!". This threat, later reported by Northrop, was eventually carried though when Symington cancelled the Flying Wing programme and ordered all existing aircraft destroyed.

== U.S. Senator ==
=== Election ===
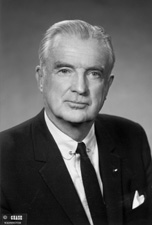
Symington in the Senate

At the urging of his father-in-law James W. Wadsworth Jr., a former Republican Speaker of the New York State Assembly and U.S. Senator from New York, Symington decided to run for the U.S. Senate.

In 1952, he was elected Senator from Missouri, taking the seat previously held by Truman and scoring a win for the Democrats in a year otherwise favorable to the Republicans. He was re-elected in 1958, 1964, and 1970.

=== Senate Armed Services and Foreign Relations committees ===
As a member of the Senate Armed Services and Foreign Relations committees, Symington specialized in military affairs and became known as an advocate for a strong national defense. He was also a strong supporter of the Air Force Academy.

In 1954, he charged that the Department of Defense had wasted millions of dollars on outdated weapons. He became a leading critic of U.S. involvement in the Vietnam War (1957–1975). During 1966, he was thoroughly briefed on the Central Intelligence Agency-run covert operations of the Laotian Civil War. At one point, he was a guest of CIA Chief of Station Ted Shackley while touring the Kingdom of Laos. In the early 1970s, when his committee held hearings on the subject, Symington professed shocked outrage at the CIA's audacity.

=== Opponent of Joseph McCarthy ===
Symington was an especially vocal opponent of Senator Joseph McCarthy, to the vexation of the latter, who nicknamed him "Sanctimonious Stu". He involved himself in the case of Annie Lee Moss, who had been brought before McCarthy's committee under the accusation that she was a Communist spy. Evidence supporting this claim was given by an undercover FBI agent who could not be cross-examined by Mrs. Moss or her counsel. As it appeared that Moss had been mistakenly identified, Symington proclaimed before the packed audience that he believed she was not a Communist and had never been, receiving thunderous applause from those present. Later that year, Symington took a lead role in censuring McCarthy during the Army–McCarthy hearings, capitalizing upon his prominence and expertise as a former Secretary of the Air Force.

=== Presidential candidacy ===
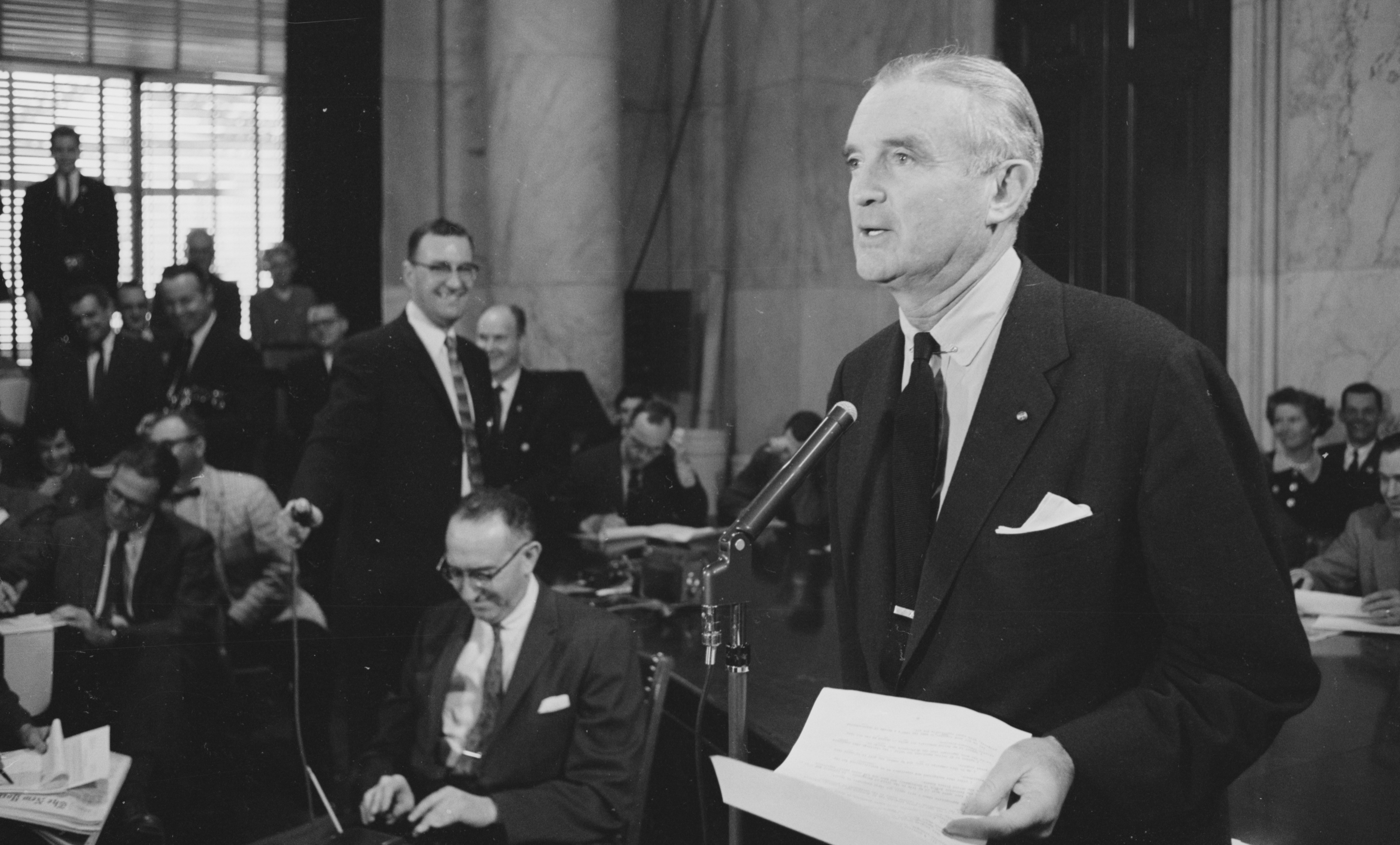
Symington at a press conference announcing his decision to run for president

In 1959, Symington, then U.S. senator from Missouri, was preparing to run in the 1960 presidential election and won the backing of former president and fellow Missourian Harry Truman, but eventually lost the nomination to Senator John F. Kennedy. On July 2, 1960, Truman announced that he would not be attending the Democratic National Convention in Los Angeles. Truman was miffed that the convention was being controlled by the "overzealous" supporters of Kennedy. Announcing his decision, Truman restated his support for the candidacy of Symington and added, "I have no second choice".

Symington, unlike Kennedy or Lyndon B. Johnson, refused to speak to segregated audiences in the southern United States and this hurt his chances. Additionally, having concluded that the nomination would be determined by party bosses at the convention, Symington declined to enter any of the Democratic primaries, clearing the way for Kennedy to win enough primaries to be the frontrunner and probable nominee as the convention opened. He was Kennedy's first choice for Vice President, but was dropped in favor of Lyndon Johnson, then U.S. senator from Texas. He advised President Kennedy as a member of EXCOMM during the October 1962 Cuban Missile Crisis.

=== Other issues ===
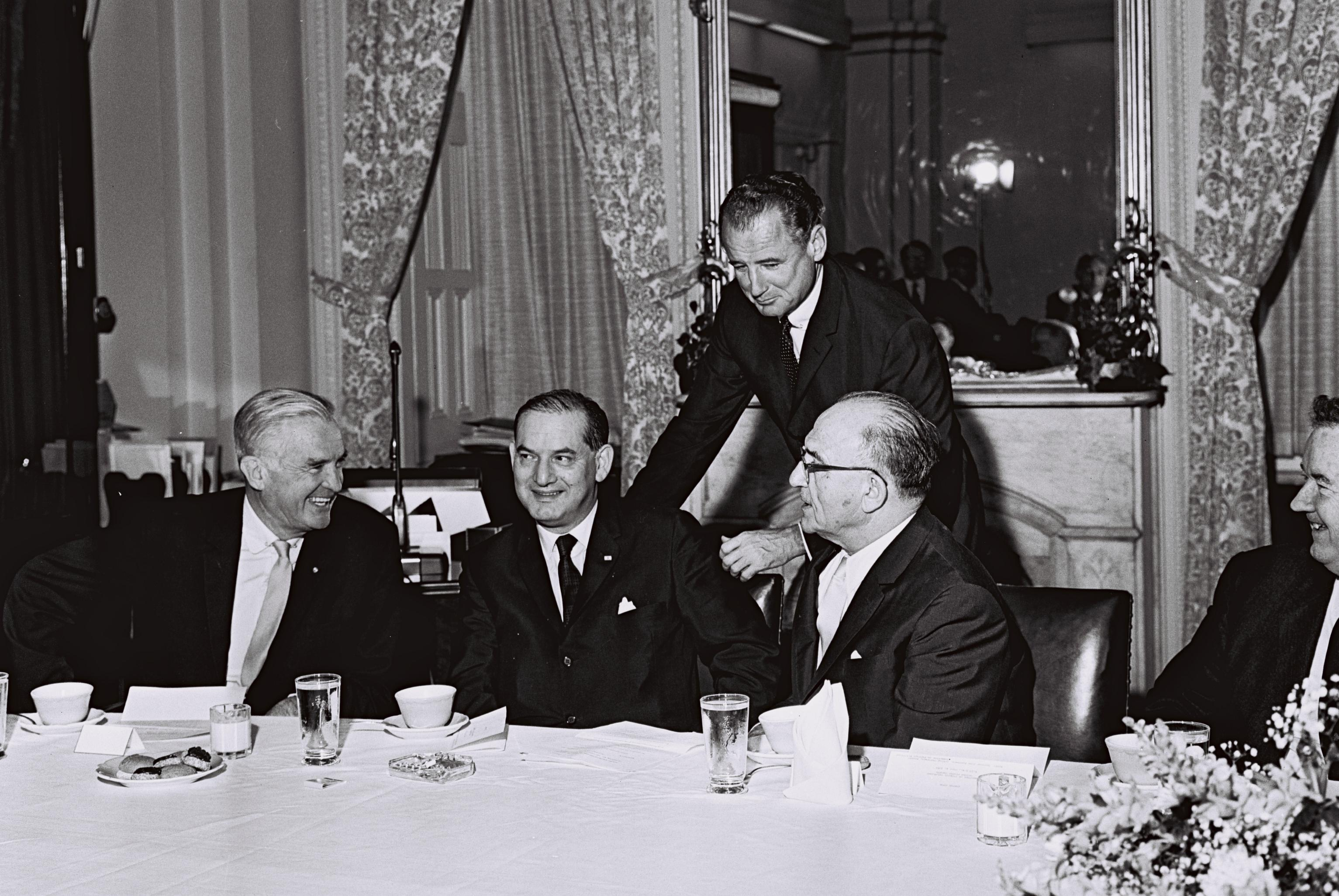
Symington (far left) and other Senate Foreign Relations Committee members John Sparkman (far right) and George Smathers (standing) meet with Israeli Ambassador Avraham Harman (second from left) and Prime Minister Levi Eshkol (second from right) in Washington, D.C., June 1, 1964

Symington was also committed to constituent services, answering letters from Missouri citizens both important, trivial, and sometimes even zany. As an example, Symington once formally requested a report from military sources regarding the possible existence of subterranean superhumans, which one of his constituents had become concerned about after reading a fiction book and mistaking it for non-fiction. In 2002, this and Symington's other senatorial correspondence and papers were donated to the Western Historical Manuscripts Collection of the University of Missouri and are now available to the general public.

In 1967 when Major League Baseball owners approved the move of the Kansas City Athletics to Oakland, California, he threatened legislation to revoke the league's antitrust exemption and vowed to support lawsuits challenging the legality of the reserve clause. Kansas City was awarded an expansion team, the Kansas City Royals, which was scheduled to begin play in 1971. Symington, saying Kansas City should not wait, continued to threaten the league, and the team began play in 1969. An indirect consequence of this was that Sick's Stadium (the home of the other American League expansion team, the Seattle Pilots) was unable to be renovated in time for the season, its resulting poor quality being a leading reason for the team's bankruptcy and subsequent move to Milwaukee as the Brewers after just one season.

Symington did not sign the 1956 Southern Manifesto, and voted in favor of the Civil Rights Acts of 1957, 1960, 1964, and 1968, as well as the Twenty-fourth Amendment to the United States Constitution, the Voting Rights Act of 1965, and the confirmation of Thurgood Marshall to the U.S. Supreme Court.

=== Resignation ===
In 1976, Symington did not seek a fifth term and resigned on December 27, a week before the end of his final term, so that his Republican successor, John Danforth, would gain a seniority advantage in the Senate.

== Legacy ==
In 1962, in recognition of his career, Princeton University's American Whig-Cliosophic Society awarded Symington the James Madison Award for Distinguished Public Service.

His son, James W. Symington, served in the United States House of Representatives from Missouri's Second Congressional District from 1969 to 1977. His cousin, Fife Symington, was Governor of Arizona from 1991 to 1997. His grandson, also named W. Stuart Symington, was employed by the United States Department of State, and served as U.S. ambassador to Djibouti (2006–2008), Rwanda (2008–2011) and Nigeria (2016–2019). Symington was an active member of the Grand Lodge of Missouri Ancient Free and Accepted Masons.

Symington retired in 1978 to his home in New Canaan, Connecticut, where he died on December 14, 1988.

He is buried in a crypt in Washington National Cathedral.

In Jeff Greenfield's alternate history book If Kennedy Lived, Symington is featured as surviving-President John F. Kennedy's running mate in the 1964 presidential election, after Vice President Lyndon Johnson is forced to leave office due to financial scandals.

== See also ==
- Symington Amendment

Political offices
Preceded by Robert A. Lovett	Assistant Secretary of War for Air; 1946–1947	Succeeded by Himself as Secretary of the Air Force
Preceded by Himself as Assistant Secretary of War for Air	United States Secretary of the Air Force; 1947–1950	Succeeded by Thomas K. Finletter
Party political offices
Preceded by Frank P. Briggs	Democratic nominee for U.S. Senator from Missouri (Class 1); 1952, 1958, 1964, 1970	Succeeded by Jerry Litton
U.S. Senate
Preceded by James P. Kem	U.S. Senator (Class 1) from Missouri; 1953–1976; Served alongside: Thomas Hennings, Edward V. Long, Thomas Eagleton	Succeeded by John Danforth
