= Harold P. Hamilton =

American professor, politician, and soldier

Harold Philip Hamilton
- Born: April 26, 1924; High Point, North Carolina, U.S.
- Died: July 1, 2003 (aged 79); Columbus, Ohio, U.S.
- Resting place: Cave Hill Cemetery; Louisville, Kentucky, U.S.
- Education: High Point College (BA); Duke University (BD, PhD)
- Occupations: Professor; politician; soldier
- Employers: North Carolina State University (1954); Kentucky Wesleyan College (1955–1970); Central Methodist College (1970–1976)
- Military career
- Allegiance: United States
- Branch: United States Army
- Unit: 84th Infantry Division
- Conflicts: World War II; Battle of the Bulge

Harold Philip Hamilton (April 26, 1924 – July 1, 2003) was an American soldier, college president, professor, state government official and charity administrator.

== Early life ==
Hamilton was born in High Point, North Carolina, the youngest of eleven children of a Methodist minister.

Hamilton served during World War II in the United States Army. He began his service at Lehigh University in Pennsylvania training to be an engineer, but in preparation for the Normandy Invasion his unit (among others) was sent to Camp Claiborne, Louisiana to train as infantry. Hamilton was shipped with his unit to Europe where he was in combat with the 84th Infantry Division in France, the Netherlands and Germany in the Rhineland campaign, assault on the Siegfried Line and the Battle of the Bulge during which he was injured and returned to England for medical attention including to his frozen feet which caused him pain and problems for almost sixty years.

Hamilton was discharged from the Army in 1945 and returned to North Carolina to resume his studies. He earned a B.A. cum laude from High Point College and a B.D. and Ph.D. from the Duke University Divinity School in 1954.

== Career ==
In 1954, he was appointed as a professor at North Carolina State University where he also ran the YMCA. In 1955 Hamilton was appointed Dean of the College and Professor of Christian Thought at Kentucky Wesleyan College in Owensboro, Kentucky. In 1959 at age 35 Hamilton became president of the college. At the time Kentucky Wesleyan was in the midst of steep operating deficits and academic and enrollment problems. Under Hamilton's leadership the college improved its financial situation, quickly mounting operating surpluses, and also greatly increased its enrollment and bolstered its faculty with increased pay and benefits and the addition of many highly regarded new professors. Kentucky Wesleyan reached its peak enrollment during Hamilton's tenure. Successful fundraising also allowed for the construction of several new buildings on the campus; in one campaign Hamilton enlisted the students to raise $250,000 to build a new library, and they did. Hamilton also gave great attention to Kentucky Wesleyan's athletic programs and during his tenure the school, with its student body and athletic teams racially integrated somewhat ahead of many others, won its first few Division II basketball national championships (1966, 1968 and 1969) and established a program that is still today the most successful in Division II competition.

In 1970, after eleven years as president at Kentucky Wesleyan, Hamilton accepted the presidency of Central Methodist College in Fayette, Missouri. Central Methodist, like Kentucky Wesleyan prior to Hamilton's arrival, faced declining enrollment, shaky finances and low morale. The 1970s were difficult times for small colleges across the United States and Central Methodist in particular entered the decade with a difficult financial future. Hamilton introduced new programs to attract new students, including organizing the Allied Health Consortium among various Missouri schools. Hamilton also tirelessly worked to build new ties between the college and Missouri's Methodist churches and to recruit new students. An office (using donated facilities procured by Hamilton) was opened in St. Louis to assist with school business and recruitment. Hamilton improved conditions for the school's faculty by installing telephones in their offices, instituting health insurance as part of their employment benefits, and raising faculty pay. Hamilton also established the school's first sabbatical program for faculty and made it a regular part of college affairs. He also instituted faculty evaluations, conducted by faculty and students. The curriculum was expanded and college governance was opened up, allowing for greater participation by more people and interests. Hamilton also established a nursing program which continued as an important part of the college long after his departure. Hamilton added new academic and athletic scholarships. In 1973 the school's rugby team finished third in the national championship tournament, and the first women's athletic teams at the college were established during Hamilton's term as president. Hamilton also arranged to have the tombstones of Daniel Boone and his wife returned to the college. Also while at Central Methodist, Hamilton was ordained as a Methodist minister.

Hamilton left Central Methodist in 1976. He returned to Kentucky and served as Assistant State Treasurer for the state of Kentucky from 1976 through 1980 and as executive director of the Department of Corporations in the Kentucky Secretary of State's office in 1980. His later positions included Vice President for Development, Timken Mercy Medical Center, Canton, Ohio, 1980 through 1983; president of the Deaconess Hospital Foundation, Evansville, Indiana, 1983 through 1984 (he was also assistant pastor at Aldersgate United Methodist Church in Evansville in that time), and vice president for planned giving for the Ohio Presbyterian Retirement Services Foundation in Columbus, Ohio, from 1985 to his retirement.

In 1963 and 1965 Hamilton returned to his alma mater, High Point College, to give the commencement address and to receive an honorary L.H.D. degree. He also twice studied at Oxford University in England.

== Personal life ==
After battling heart problems, Hamilton died in Columbus, Ohio, in 2003 and was buried with military honors at Cave Hill Cemetery in Louisville, Kentucky. He was survived by his wife, four children, seven grandchildren and three great-grandchildren.

== Further reading and sources ==
- Central Methodist College 1961–1986, Bartlett C. Jones, editor, Central Methodist College, 1986.
- In Pursuit of the Dream: A History of Kentucky Wesleyan College, by Lee A. Dew and Richard A. Weiss, Kentucky Wesleyan College Press/Progress Printing Company, 1992.
- Dew, Lee A., Kentucky Wesleyan College, The Kentucky Encyclopedia, John E. Kleber, editor in chief, The University Press of Kentucky, 1992.

Preceded by Oscar W. Lever	President of Kentucky Wesleyan College; 1959–1970	Succeeded by William James
Preceded by Ralph L. Woodward	President of Central Methodist College; 1970–1976	Succeeded by Thomas R. Feld, acting
