= McMurry University =

Methodist university in Abilene, Texas, US

Coordinates: 32.430°N 99.750°W

- Former name: McMurry College (1923–1990)
- Motto: Cultivating Leadership Excellence and Virtue... Every Student, Every Day.
- Type: Private university
- Established: September 20, 1923; 102 years ago
- Religious affiliation: United Methodist Church
- Endowment: $94.5 million (2019)
- President: Dr. Lynne Murray
- Undergraduates: 4,144
- Location: Abilene, Texas, United States
- Campus: Urban, 40 acres (.16 km²)
- Colors: Maroon and White
- Mascot: War Hawks
- Website: mcm.edu
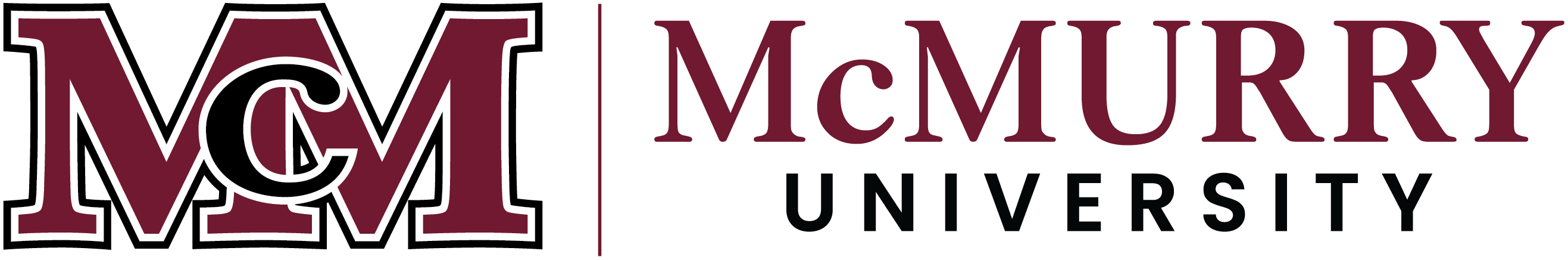

McMurry University is a private Methodist university in Abilene, Texas, United States. It was founded in 1923 and named after William Fletcher McMurry. The university offers forty-five majors in the fields of fine arts, humanities, social and natural sciences, education, business, and religion, and nine pre-professional programs, including nursing, dentistry, medicine, pharmacy, veterinary, and law.

In the fall of 2023, the university enrolled 2,556 students. Methodist students constitute 27 percent of the student population. Ninety five percent of students are Texan. Minority groups make up approximately one-fourth of the student body. In the freshman class, 98 percent of students receive some financial aid. Fifty-three percent of students live on campus, and 75 percent of students are involved in at least one extracurricular activity. McMurry boasts a student to faculty ratio of 13:1.

91 percent of the faculty have earned a doctorate or other terminal degree in their field. McMurry is accredited by the Commission on Colleges of the Southern Association of Colleges and Schools.

== History ==
The college was initially founded as McMurry College on September 20, 1923. The college was established through the efforts of Methodist minister James Winfred Hunt and the Northwest Texas Conference of the Methodist Church, who initially voted to establish the school in 1920. After working with the city of Abilene to acquire the needed land, the charter of the school was ratified on November 21, 1921. Accreditation from the Texas Association of Colleges was received in 1926, the same year the school graduated its first class.

The college gained university status in 1990, becoming McMurry University.

=== Indians mascot controversy ===
McMurry's sports teams originally used Indians as their mascot. In late August 2005, the National Collegiate Athletic Association (NCAA) handed down a decision calling for the eighteen universities with Native American mascots to change their names or obtain a waiver from their representative tribe for the use of the mascot name. The McMurry Indians were part of this list. The Indians nickname was chosen as a tribute to the University's first president, J.W. Hunt, who grew up on an Indian reservation in the Indian Territory.

On May 18, 2006, the NCAA rejected McMurry's appeal to keep their nickname. The school chose to appeal the ruling, and indicated their intention to do so by the June 18, 2006, deadline. According to a press release, "the University’s appeal will be based on the arbitrariness of the NCAA’s decision-making process and the inconsistent results and messages that have come from the process." Other schools, such as Florida State University, made successful appeals by garnering the endorsement of Indian tribes. Although McMurry did not actively seek an endorsement, representatives from the Kaw, Kiowa, and Comanche tribes voiced their approval of McMurry's mascot. In October 2006, McMurry's board of trustees decided that the university would no longer use any names for its athletic teams. Citing the school's 83-year history of honoring Native Americans, the school announced that in spite of no longer using names to designate athletic teams, the school traditions created to honor Native Americans would continue. The school's stadium name was changed from Indian Stadium to Wilford Moore Stadium as of May 13, 2007. Wilford Moore was the most-winning coach in McMurry football history.

On March 11, 2011, it was announced that McMurry University's athletic teams would be known as the War Hawks. The new mascot was chosen after a nearly year-long search to find a new mascot to replace the former Indian mascot. The war hawk is meant to represent pride, courage and fierce competition for McMurry's athletic teams.

== Athletics ==
McMurry fields teams in 20 different intercollegiate sports. For the men, McMurry competes in baseball, basketball, cross country, football, golf, soccer, swimming, tennis, esports, indoor and outdoor track and field and wrestling. For the women, McMurry competes in basketball, cross country, golf, soccer, swimming, tennis, esports, indoor and outdoor track and field, volleyball, in which they won the NCCAA national championship in 2012, wrestling and softball. McMurry University will become a member of the American Southwest Conference (ASC) in the 2026-27 academic year.

== Notable alumni ==
- Vernon Asbill, educator and former member of the New Mexico Senate
- Dan W. Dodson, former sociology professor at New York University
- V. O. Key Jr., political scientist
- Jorge Antonio Solis, U.S. federal judge
- Grant Teaff, former head football coach for Baylor University; executive director for the American Football Coaches Association
- Sarah Weddington, U.S. attorney in Roe v. Wade
- Dick Compton, NFL player
- Ernie Park, NFL player
- Brad Rowland, NFL player
- Karl Scott, NFL coach
- William Arthur Ward, writer
- Charlene Holt, actress
- Jordan Neuman, former pro football player and current head coach

== Notable faculty ==
- William Curry Holden, historian and archeologist
- Virgil E. Bottom, experimental physicist and humanitarian
