= Claiborne =

Claiborne may refer to:

== People ==
=== Surname ===
- Billy Claiborne (1860–1882), American outlaw
- Lindy Boggs (Corinne Claiborne Boggs, 1916–2013), American politician from Louisiana and diplomat
- Chris Claiborne (born 1978), American football player
- Craig Claiborne (1920–2000), American food writer and columnist
- Demond Claiborne (born 2003), American football player
- Ferdinand Claiborne (1773–1815), American military officer
- Harry C. Claiborne (1859–1918), American lighthouse keeper
- Harry E. Claiborne (1917–2004), American jurist from Nevada
- James Robert Claiborne (1882–1944), American politician from Missouri
- John Claiborne (1777–1808), American politician from Virginia
- John Claiborne (baseball executive) (born 1940), American baseball executive and businessman
- John Francis Hamtramck Claiborne (1809–1884), American politician from Mississippi
- John Herbert Claiborne (1828–1905), surgeon and physicist
- Liz Claiborne (1929–2007), American fashion designer and entrepreneur
- Nathaniel Claiborne (1777–1859), American politician from Virginia
- Preston Claiborne (born 1988), American baseball player and coach
- Robert Claiborne (1919–1990), American folk singer, labor organizer and writer
- Shane Claiborne (born 1975), Christian writer, speaker, and activist
- Theresa Claiborne (born 1959), first African-American female pilot in the US Air Force
- Thomas Claiborne (Virginia politician), American politician from Virginia
- Thomas Claiborne (politician, born 1780), American lawyer and politician from Tennessee
- Thomas A. Claiborne (b. 1770s–1818), American physician from Tennessee
- William Claiborne (c. 1600–1676), American politician from Virginia
- William C. C. Claiborne (died 1817), American politician from Tennessee and Louisiana
- William C. C. Claiborne II (1808–1878), American politician from Louisiana

=== Given name ===
- C. P. Ellis (Claiborne P. Ellis, 1927–2005), Ku Klux Klan member turned civil rights activist
- Claiborne P. Deming, American businessman
- Claiborne Gregory (1920–2006), American politician from Virginia
- Claiborne Fox Jackson (1806–1862), American politician from Missouri
- Claiborne Pell (1918–2009), American politician from Rhode Island

== Places in the United States ==
- Claiborne, Alabama
- Claiborne, Louisiana
- Claiborne, Maryland
- Claiborne, Virginia
- Claiborne County (disambiguation)
- Claiborne Farm, thoroughbred race horse breeding farm in Paris, Kentucky
- Claiborne Formation, a geologic formation in Arkansas, Illinois, and Kentucky, U.S.
- Claiborne Parish, Louisiana
- Lake Claiborne, a reservoir near Homer, Louisiana, U.S.

== See also ==
- Cliburn (surname)
- Dolores Claiborne, novel by Stephen King
- Dolores Claiborne (film), based on the novel
- Dolores Claiborne (opera), a 2013 opera by Tobias Picker, based on the novel
