= 1949 in the United States =

- Decades: 1920s; 1930s; 1940s; 1950s; 1960s
- See also: History of the United States (1945–1964); Timeline of United States history (1930–1949); List of years in the United States

Events from the year 1949 in the United States.

== Incumbents ==
=== Federal government ===
- President: Harry S. Truman (D-Missouri)
- Vice President:

vacant (until January 20)
Alben W. Barkley (D-Kentucky) (starting January 20)

- Chief Justice: Fred M. Vinson (Kentucky)
- Speaker of the House of Representatives:

Joseph William Martin Jr. (R-Massachusetts) (until January 3)
Sam Rayburn (D-Texas) (starting January 3)

- Senate Majority Leader:

Wallace H. White Jr. (R-Maine) (until January 3)
Scott W. Lucas (D-Illinois) (starting January 3)

- Congress: 80th (until January 3), 81st (starting January 3)

==== State governments ====
Governors and lieutenant governors

=== Governors ===
- Governor of Alabama: Jim Folsom (Democratic)
- Governor of Arizona: Dan Edward Garvey (Democratic)
- Governor of Arkansas: Benjamin Travis Laney (Democratic) (until January 11), Sid McMath (Democratic) (starting January 11)
- Governor of California: Earl Warren (Republican)
- Governor of Colorado: William Lee Knous (Democratic)
- Governor of Connecticut: James C. Shannon (Republican) (until January 5), Chester Bowles (Democratic) (starting January 5)
- Governor of Delaware: Walter W. Bacon (Republican) (until January 18), Elbert N. Carvel (Democratic) (starting January 18)
- Governor of Florida: Millard F. Caldwell (Democratic) (until January 4), Fuller Warren (Democratic) (starting January 4)
- Governor of Georgia: Herman Talmadge (Democratic)
- Governor of Idaho: C. A. Robins (Republican)
- Governor of Illinois: Dwight H. Green (Republican) (until January 10), Adlai E. Stevenson II (Democratic) (starting January 10)
- Governor of Indiana: Ralph F. Gates (Republican) (until January 10), Henry F. Schricker (Democratic) (starting January 10)
- Governor of Iowa: Robert D. Blue (Republican) (until January 13), William S. Beardsley (Republican) (starting January 13)
- Governor of Kansas: Frank Carlson (Republican)
- Governor of Kentucky: Earle C. Clements (Democratic)
- Governor of Louisiana: Earl K. Long (Democratic)
- Governor of Maine: Horace A. Hildreth (Republican) (until January 5), Frederick G. Payne (Republican) (starting January 5)
- Governor of Maryland: William Preston Lane Jr. (Democratic)
- Governor of Massachusetts: Robert F. Bradford (Republican) (until January 6), Paul A. Dever (Democratic) (starting January 6)
- Governor of Michigan: Kim Sigler (Republican) (until January 1), G. Mennen Williams (Democratic) (starting January 1)
- Governor of Minnesota: Luther W. Youngdahl (Republican)
- Governor of Mississippi: Fielding L. Wright (Democratic)
- Governor of Missouri: Phil M. Donnelly (Democratic) (until January 10), Forrest Smith (Democratic) (starting January 10)
- Governor of Montana: Sam C. Ford (Republican) (until January 3), John W. Bonner (Democratic) (starting January 3)
- Governor of Nebraska: Val Peterson (Republican)
- Governor of Nevada: Vail M. Pittman (Democratic)
- Governor of New Hampshire: Charles M. Dale (Republican) (until January 6), Sherman Adams (Republican) (starting January 6)
- Governor of New Jersey: Alfred E. Driscoll (Republican)
- Governor of New Mexico: Thomas J. Mabry (Democratic)
- Governor of New York: Thomas Dewey (Republican)
- Governor of North Carolina: R. Gregg Cherry (Democratic) (until January 6), W. Kerr Scott (Democratic) (starting January 6)
- Governor of North Dakota: Fred G. Aandahl (Republican)
- Governor of Ohio: Thomas J. Herbert (Republican) (until January 10), Frank J. Lausche (Democratic) (starting January 10)
- Governor of Oklahoma: Roy J. Turner (Democratic)
- Governor of Oregon: John H. Hall (Republican) (until January 10), Douglas McKay (Republican) (starting January 10)
- Governor of Pennsylvania: James H. Duff (Republican)
- Governor of Rhode Island: John Orlando Pastore (Democratic)
- Governor of South Carolina: Strom Thurmond (Democratic)
- Governor of South Dakota: George T. Mickelson (Republican)
- Governor of Tennessee: Jim Nance McCord (Democratic) (until January 16), Gordon Browning (Democratic) (starting January 16)
- Governor of Texas: Beauford H. Jester (Democratic) (until July 11), Allan Shivers (Democratic) (starting July 11)
- Governor of Utah: Herbert B. Maw (Democratic) (until January 3), J. Bracken Lee (Republican) (starting January 3)
- Governor of Vermont: Ernest W. Gibson Jr. (Republican)
- Governor of Virginia: William M. Tuck (Democratic)
- Governor of Washington: Monrad C. Wallgren (Democratic) (until January 12), Arthur B. Langlie (Republican) (starting January 12)
- Governor of West Virginia: Clarence W. Meadows (Democratic) (until January 17), Okey L. Patteson (Democratic) (starting January 17)
- Governor of Wisconsin: Oscar Rennebohm (Republican)
- Governor of Wyoming: Lester C. Hunt (Democratic) (until January 3), Arthur G. Crane (Republican) (starting January 3)

=== Lieutenant governors ===
- Lieutenant Governor of Alabama: James C. Inzer (Democratic)
- Lieutenant Governor of Arkansas: Nathan Green Gordon (Democratic)
- Lieutenant Governor of California: Goodwin Knight (Republican)
- Lieutenant Governor of Colorado: Homer Pearson (Republican) (until month and day unknown), Walter Walford Johnson (Democratic) (starting month and day unknown)
- Lieutenant Governor of Connecticut: Robert E. Parsons (Republican) (until January 5), William T. Carroll (Democratic) (starting January 5)
- Lieutenant Governor of Delaware: Elbert N. Carvel (Democratic) (until January 20), Alexis I. du Pont Bayard (Democratic) (starting January 20)
- Lieutenant Governor of Georgia: Marvin Griffin (Democratic)
- Lieutenant Governor of Idaho: Donald S. Whitehead (Republican)
- Lieutenant Governor of Illinois: Hugh W. Cross (Republican) (until January 10), Sherwood Dixon (Democratic) (starting January 10)
- Lieutenant Governor of Indiana: Rue J. Alexander (Republican) (until January 2), John A. Watkins (Democratic) (starting January 2)
- Lieutenant Governor of Iowa: Kenneth A. Evans (Republican)
- Lieutenant Governor of Kansas: Frank L. Hagaman (Republican)
- Lieutenant Governor of Kentucky: Lawrence Wetherby (Democratic)
- Lieutenant Governor of Louisiana: William J. Dodd (Democratic)
- Lieutenant Governor of Massachusetts: Arthur W. Coolidge (Republican) (until January 6), Charles F. Sullivan (Republican) (starting January 6)
- Lieutenant Governor of Michigan: Eugene C. Keyes (Republican) (until month and day unknown), John W. Connolly (Democratic) (starting month and day unknown)
- Lieutenant Governor of Minnesota: C. Elmer Anderson (Republican)
- Lieutenant Governor of Mississippi: Sam Lumpkin (Democratic)
- Lieutenant Governor of Missouri: Walter Naylor Davis (Democratic) (until January 10), James T. Blair Jr. (Democratic) (starting January 10)
- Lieutenant Governor of Montana: Ernest T. Eaton (political party unknown) (until month and day unknown), Paul Cannon (Democratic) (starting month and day unknown)
- Lieutenant Governor of Nebraska: Robert B. Crosby (Republican) (until month and day unknown), Charles J. Warner (Republican) (starting month and day unknown)
- Lieutenant Governor of Nevada: Clifford A. Jones (Democratic)
- Lieutenant Governor of New Mexico: Joseph Montoya (Democratic)
- Lieutenant Governor of New York: Joseph R. Hanley (Republican)
- Lieutenant Governor of North Carolina: Lynton Y. Ballentine (Democratic) (until January 6), Hoyt Patrick Taylor (Democratic) (starting January 6)
- Lieutenant Governor of North Dakota: Clarence P. Dahl (Republican)
- Lieutenant Governor of Ohio: Paul M. Herbert (Republican) (until January 10), George D. Nye (Democratic) (starting January 10)
- Lieutenant Governor of Oklahoma: James E. Berry (Democratic)
- Lieutenant Governor of Pennsylvania: Daniel B. Strickler (Republican)
- Lieutenant Governor of Rhode Island: John S. McKiernan (Democratic)
- Lieutenant Governor of South Carolina: George Bell Timmerman Jr. (Democratic)
- Lieutenant Governor of South Dakota: Sioux K. Grigsby (Republican) (until month and day unknown), Rex A. Terry (Republican) (starting month and day unknown)
- Lieutenant Governor of Tennessee: George Oliver Benton (Democratic) (until month and day unknown), Walter M. Haynes (Democratic) (starting month and day unknown)
- Lieutenant Governor of Texas: Allan Shivers (Democratic) (until July 11), vacant (starting July 11)
- Lieutenant Governor of Vermont: Lee E. Emerson (Republican) (until month and day unknown), Harold J. Arthur (Republican) (starting month and day unknown)
- Lieutenant Governor of Virginia: Lewis Preston Collins II (Democratic)
- Lieutenant Governor of Washington: Victor A. Meyers (Democratic)
- Lieutenant Governor of Wisconsin: Oscar Rennebohm (Republican) (until January 3), George M. Smith (Republican) (starting January 3)

== Events ==
=== January–March ===
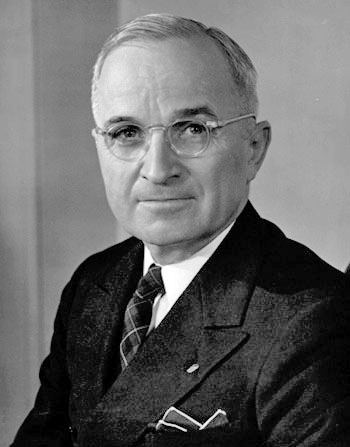
January 20: Harry S. Truman, the 33rd president of the United States, begins his full term

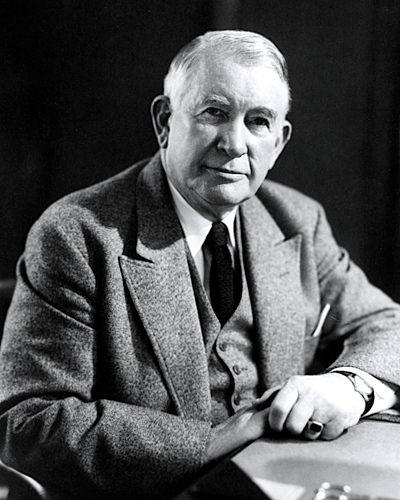
Alben W. Barkley becomes the 35th U.S. vice president

- January 2 – Luis Muñoz Marín becomes the first democratically elected Governor of Puerto Rico.
- January 4 – RMS Caronia (1947) of the Cunard Line departs Southampton for New York City on her maiden voyage.
- January 4–February 22 – Series of winter storms in Nebraska, Wyoming, South Dakota, Utah, Colorado and Nevada – winds of up to 72 mph – tens of thousands of cattle and sheep perish.
- January 5 – President Harry S. Truman unveils his Fair Deal program.
- January 11 – Los Angeles, California, receives its first recorded snowfall.
- January 17 – The first Volkswagen Beetle to arrive in the United States, a 1948 model, is brought to New York City by Dutch businessman Ben Pon. Unable to interest dealers or importers in the Volkswagen, Pon sells the sample car to pay his travel expenses. Only two 1949 models will be sold in America that year, convincing Volkswagen chairman Heinrich Nordhoff that the car has no future in the U.S. (The VW Beetle goes on to become the greatest automobile phenomenon in American history.)
- January 19 – The Poe Toaster first appears at the grave of Edgar Allan Poe.
- January 20 – President Harry S. Truman begins his full term. Alben W. Barkley is sworn in as Vice President of the United States.
- January 25 – The first Emmy Awards are presented at the Hollywood Athletic Club.
- February 10 – Arthur Miller's tragedy Death of a Salesman opens at the Morosco Theatre on Broadway in New York City with Lee J. Cobb in the title role of Willy Loman and runs for 742 performances.
- February 19 – Ezra Pound is awarded the first Bollingen Prize in poetry by the Bollingen Foundation and Yale University.
- February 22 – Grady the Cow, a 1,200-pound cow, gets stuck inside a silo on a farm in Yukon, Oklahoma and garners national media attention.
- March 2 – The B-50 Superfortress Lucky Lady II under Captain James Gallagher lands in Fort Worth, Texas, after completing the first non-stop around-the-world airplane flight (it was refueled in flight 4 times).
- March 20 – The Chicago, Burlington & Quincy, Denver & Rio Grande Western and Western Pacific railroads inaugurate the California Zephyr passenger train between Chicago and Oakland, California, as the first long-distance train to feature Vista Dome cars as regular equipment.
- March 24 – The 21st Academy Awards ceremony, hosted by Robert Montgomery, is held at the Academy Theater in Hollywood, Los Angeles. Laurence Olivier's Hamlet wins the most awards with four, including Best Picture, while John Huston wins Best Director for The Treasure of the Sierra Madre. Jean Negulesco's Johnny Belinda receives the most nominations with 12.
- March 26 – The first half of Giuseppe Verdi's opera Aida, conducted by conductor Arturo Toscanini, and performed in concert (i.e. no scenery or costumes), is telecast by NBC, live from Studio 8H at Rockefeller Center. The second half is telecast a week later. This is the only complete opera that Toscanini ever conducts on television.
- March 28 – United States Secretary of Defense James Forrestal resigns suddenly.

=== April–June ===
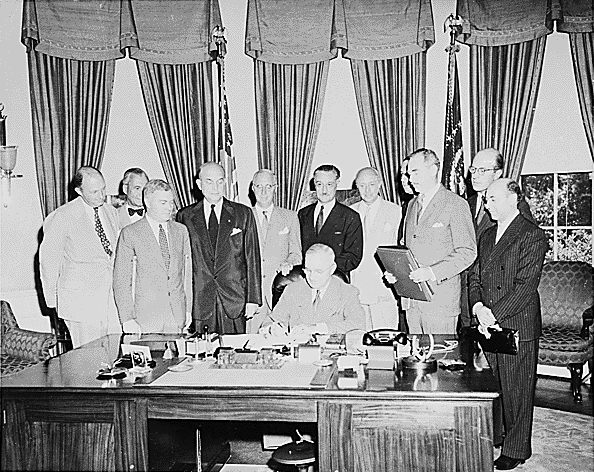
April 4: NATO

- April 4 – The North Atlantic Treaty is signed in Washington, D.C., creating the NATO defense alliance.
- April 7 – Rodgers and Hammerstein's South Pacific, starring Mary Martin and Ezio Pinza, opens on Broadway and goes on to become R&H's second longest-running musical. It becomes an instant classic of the musical theatre. The score's biggest hit is the song Some Enchanted Evening.
- April 13 – The 6.7 M_{w} Olympia earthquake affected the Puget Sound region of western Washington with a maximum Mercalli intensity of VIII (Severe), causing eight deaths and $25 million in damage.
- April 23 – Development of the USS United States (CVA-58) "supercarrier" is cancelled; high-ranking Navy officials resign in protest in what has been called the Revolt of the Admirals.
- May 1 Albert Einstein publishes Why Socialism? in the first edition of the Monthly Review.
- May ? – A working group has been set up by United States Department of State, to codify the White Paper. This team consists of more than 80 staff members, led by Secretary of State Dean Acheson, former Columbia University Professor of Public International Law Philip C. Jessup.
- June 8 – Red Scare: Celebrities including Helen Keller, Dorothy Parker, Danny Kaye, Fredric March, John Garfield, Paul Muni and Edward G. Robinson are named in an FBI report as Communist Party members.
- June 14 – Albert II, a rhesus monkey, becomes the first primate to enter space, on Hermes project V-2 rocket Blossom IVB, but is killed on impact at return.
- June 19 – Glenn Dunaway wins the inaugural NASCAR race at Charlotte Speedway, a 3/4 mile oval in Charlotte, North Carolina, but is disqualified due to illegal springs. Jim Roper is declared the official winner.
- June 24 – The first television western, Hopalong Cassidy, airs on NBC.
- June 29 – The last U.S. troops withdraw from South Korea.

=== July–September ===
August 10: Department of Defense

- August 5 – United States Department of State published The China White Paper as Department of State Publication 3573, entitled "United States Relations With China, With Special Reference to the Period 1944–1949."
- August 10 – The National Military Establishment (formerly the Department of War) is renamed the Department of Defense.
- August 16 – Office of Chairman of the Joint Chiefs of Staff created.
- August 28 – The last 6 surviving veterans of the American Civil War meet in Indianapolis.
- September 5 – Howard Unruh, a World War II veteran, kills 13 neighbors in Camden, New Jersey with a souvenir Luger to become America's first single-episode mass murderer.
- September 15 – The Housing Act of 1949 is enacted.
- September 29 – Iva Toguri D'Aquino is found guilty of broadcasting for Japan as "Tokyo Rose" during World War II.

=== October–December ===
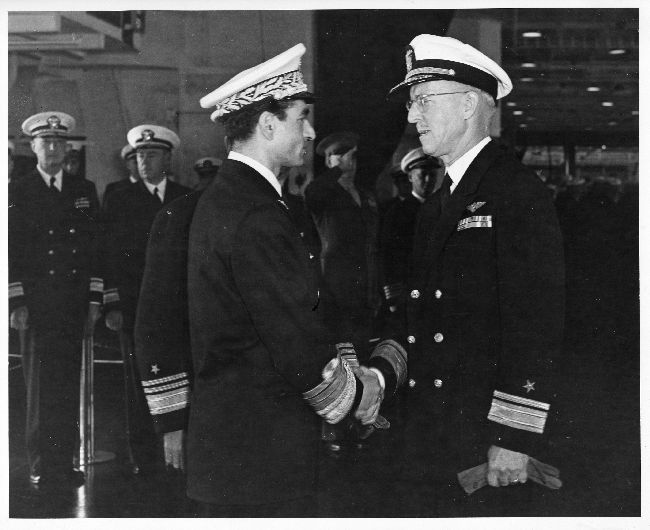
Adm. Gerald F. Bogan meets Shah of Iran, December 3, 1949

- October 5 – Walt Disney Productions' eleventh feature film, The Adventures of Ichabod and Mr. Toad, is released. It is Disney's final package film to be released during the 1940s and the last the studio would produce until 1977's The Many Adventures of Winnie the Pooh.
- October 9 – The New York Yankees defeat the Brooklyn Dodgers, 4 games to 1, to win their 12th World Series Title.
- October 27 – An airliner flying from Paris to New York City crashes in the Azores island of São Miguel. Among the victims are violinist Ginette Neveu and boxer Marcel Cerdan.
- November – Englewood race riot in Chicago.
- November 24 – The ski resort in Squaw Valley, California officially opens.

=== Undated ===
- General Services Administration established per Federal Property and Administrative Services Act of 1949
- The first 20 mm M61 Vulcan Gatling gun prototypes are completed.
- 1949 is the first year in which no African-American is lynched in the USA.

=== Ongoing ===
- Cold War (1947–1991)
- Second Red Scare (1947–1957)
- Marshall Plan (1948–1951)

== Births ==
- January 2
  - Christopher Durang, playwright (d. 2024)
  - Iris Marion Young, political scientist (died 2006)
- January 6 – Carolyn D. Wright, poet (died 2016)
- January 7 – Chavo Guerrero Sr., professional wrestler (died 2017)
- January 8
  - John Podesta, lawyer and politician, 20th White House Chief of Staff
  - Anne Schedeen, actress
- January 10
  - George Foreman, heavyweight boxer (died 2025)
  - James Lapine, director and librettist
  - Linda Lovelace, pornographic film actress (died 2002)
- January 11 – Chris Ford, basketball player and coach (died 2023)
- January 13 – Brandon Tartikoff, television executive (died 1997)
- January 22 – Steve Perry, musician
- January 24 - John Belushi, actor and comedian (died 1982)
- January 28 – Gregg Popovich, basketball coach
- January 30 – Ken Wilber, philosopher
- February 2 – Brent Spiner, actor, comedian and singer
- February 3 – Arthur Kane, bass guitarist (died 2004)
- February 4 – Michael Beck, actor
- February 8 – Brooke Adams, actress
- February 11 – George Winston, pianist (died 2023)
- February 12 – Lenny Randle, baseball player (died 2024)
- February 15 – Ken Anderson, American football quarterback and coach
- February 17 – Dennis Green, American football player and coach (died 2016)
- February 18
  - Pat Fraley, voice actor, voice-over teacher
  - Gary Ridgway, serial killer
- February 19 – Danielle Bunten Berry, born Dan(iel Paul) Bunten, software developer (died 1998)
- February 21 – Jerry Harrison, songwriter
- February 25
  - Ric Flair (Richard Fliehr), wrestler
  - Sherman Packard, speaker of the New Hampshire House of Representatives
- February 27 – John Wockenfuss, baseball player (died 2022)
- February 28
  - Ilene Graff, actress and singer
  - A. J. Smith, American football executive (died 2024)
- March 2 – Gates McFadden, actress and choreographer
- March 3
  - Roberta Alexander, operatic soprano (died 2025)
  - Gloria Hendry, African American actress
  - Jesse Jefferson, baseball player (died 2011)
  - Sandy Martin, actress
- March 4 – Helen Frost, writer
- March 10 – Barbara Corcoran, businesswoman, investor and television personality
- March 12
  - Rob Cohen, film director
  - Mary Catherine Lamb, textile artist (died 2009)
- March 13 – Julia Migenes, soprano
- March 16
  - Erik Estrada, television actor and police officer
  - Elliott Murphy, singer-songwriter
- March 17 – Patrick Duffy, television actor
- March 20 – Marcia Ball, blues musician
- March 21 – Eddie Money (Edward Mahoney), rock guitarist and singer (died 2019)
- March 25 – Sue Klebold, author and activist
- March 26 – Ernest Lee Thomas, actor
- March 28 – Michael W. Young, geneticist and chronobiologist, recipient of the Nobel Prize in Physiology or Medicine in 2017
- March 29 – Michael Brecker, jazz saxophonist (died 2007)
- April 1 – Gil Scott-Heron, African American poet, jazz/soul musician and author (died 2011)
- April 2 – Paul Gambaccini, broadcaster and author
- April 5 – Judith Resnik, astronaut (died 1986)
- April 7 – Mitch Daniels, academic administrator, businessman, author and politician, 49th governor of Indiana
- April 8 – William O'Neal, FBI informant (died 1990)
- April 9 – Stephen Hickman, illustrator (died 2021)
- April 11 – Dorothy Allison, novelist and campaigner (died 2024)
- April 18 – Geoff Bodine, race car driver
- April 20 – Jessica Lange, actress
- April 22 – Spencer Haywood, basketball player
- April 23 – Joyce DeWitt, actress
- April 26 – Jerry Blackwell, professional wrestler (died 1995)
- April 30 – Phil Garner, baseball player and manager (died 2026)
- May 1
  - Gavin Christopher, singer (died 2016)
  - Sarah Clayborne, pie chef, restaurateur and community activist
- May 3 – Ron Wyden, U.S. Senator from Oregon from 1996
- May 4
  - John Force, race car driver
  - Gary Gaines, American football coach (died 2022)
- May 6 – Larry Rivers, basketball player and coach (died 2023)
- May 7 – Deborah Butterfield, sculptor
- May 9 – Billy Joel, singer-songwriter and pianist
- May 13 – Zoë Wanamaker, actress
- May 15 – George Adams, basketball player
- May 16 – Rick Reuschel, baseball player
- May 17 – Earl Hebner, pro wrestling referee
- May 18 – Joseph R. Cistone, Catholic prelate (died 2018)
- May 19
  - Dusty Hill, rock bassist (ZZ Top) (died 2021)
  - Archie Manning, American football player, father of Peyton and Eli Manning
- May 22 –
  - Chris Butler, musician, songwriter (The Waitresses)
  - Jesse Lee Peterson, radio show host and religious minister
- May 26
  - Ward Cunningham, computer programmer
  - Pam Grier, African American actress
  - Arlene Klasky, animator
  - Philip Michael Thomas, African American actor
  - Hank Williams Jr., country singer
- May 28 – Shelley Hamlin, golfer (died 2018)
- May 29 – Robert Axelrod, voice actor (Mighty Morphin Power Rangers) (died 2019)
- June 2 – Alan Brinkley, historian (died 2019)
- June 3 – John Rothman, actor
- June 4 – Mark B. Cohen, Pennsylvania legislative leader
- June 7 – Larry Hama, comic book writer, artist, actor and musician
- June 10
  - Kevin Corcoran, child actor, television director and film producer (died 2015)
  - Frankie Faison, actor
- June 11 – Frank Beard, drummer (died 2026)
- June 14 – Harry Turtledove, novelist
- June 20 – Lionel Richie, African American singer-songwriter
- June 22
  - Larry Junstrom, rock bassist (died 2019)
  - Alan Osmond, pop singer (died 2026)
  - Meryl Streep, actress
  - Elizabeth Warren, U.S. Senator from Massachusetts from 2013
- June 23
  - Dave Goltz, baseball player
  - Gail Harris, United States Navy officer
  - Kene Holliday, actor
  - Brenda Sykes, actress
- June 25
  - Dan Barker, atheist activist
  - Phyllis George, businesswoman, actress and sportscaster (died 2020)
- June 27
  - Brent Berk, competition swimmer, Olympic athlete
  - Stephen Rucker, composer
  - Vera Wang, fashion designer
- June 28
  - Don Baylor, Major League Baseball (MLB) player, coach and manager (died 2017)
  - Clarence Davis, American football running back
  - Tom Owens, basketball player
- June 29
  - Dan Dierdorf, American football offensive lineman, later sportscaster
  - Joe Moore, American football running back
- July 1 – Denis Johnson, writer (died 2017)
- July 2 – Joe English, drummer and songwriter
- July 3
  - Jan Smithers, actress
  - Johnnie Wilder Jr., vocalist (died 2006)
- July 5
  - Ed O'Ross, actor
  - Susan P. Graber, attorney
- July 6 – Phyllis Hyman, singer and actress (died 1995)
- July 7
  - Shelley Duvall, actress (died 2024)
  - Monte Cater, American football coach
  - John Stone, law enforcement official, former sheriff of Jefferson County, Colorado (died 2022)
- July 9 – Jesse Duplantis, televangelist
- July 12 – Donda West, educator and civil rights activist (died 2007)
- July 15
  - Harvey C. Krautschun, politician (died 2026)
  - Richard Russo, novelist
- July 16 – Alan Fitzgerald, guitarist and keyboardist
- July 17 – Charley Steiner, sportscaster
- July 19 – Calvin O. Butts, academic administrator and pastor (died 2022)
- July 22 – Ann Godoff, editor and publisher (died 2026)
- July 24 – Michael Richards, actor and comedian
- July 28 – Vida Blue, baseball player (died 2023)
- July 29 – Marilyn Quayle, Second Lady of the United States as wife of Dan Quayle
- July 31
  - Mike Jackson, basketball player
  - Susan Bennett, voice-over artist
- August 1 – Jim Carroll, author, poet and punk musician (died 2009)
- August 3 – Peter Gutmann, journalist
- August 4 – John Riggins, American football player
- August 6
  - Richard Prince, painter and photographer
  - Clarence Richard Silva, bishop
- August 8
  - Terry Burnham, actress (died 2013)
  - Keith Carradine, actor
- August 9 – Ted Simmons, baseball player
- August 11
  - Eric Carmen, pop rock singer-songwriter (died 2024)
  - Tim Hutchinson, U.S. Senator from Arkansas from 1997 to 2003
  - Sandra Lee Scheuer, Kent State University shooting victim (died 1970)
- August 12 – Mark Essex, mass murderer (died 1973)
- August 13 – Pete Visclosky, politician
- August 14 – Bob Backlund, pro wrestler
- August 15
  - Beverly Burns, pilot
  - Mark B. Rosenberg, political scientist and academic
  - Phyllis Smith, actress
- August 16 – Barbara Goodson, voice actress
- August 17 – Norm Coleman, U.S. Senator from Minnesota from 2003 to 2009
- August 22
  - Doug Bair, baseball player and coach
  - Diana Nyad, swimmer and author
- August 23 – Leslie Van Houten, Manson Family member
- August 24
  - Stephen Paulus, composer and educator (died 2014)
  - Charles Rocket, actor (died 2005)
- August 29 – Stan Hansen, professional wrestler
- August 31
  - Richard Gere, film actor
  - H. David Politzer, physicist, recipient of the Nobel Prize in Physics in 2004
- September 1 – Leslie Feinberg, transgender activist (died 2014)
- September 7 – Lee McGeorge Durrell, zoologist
- September 8
  - Daniel Pipes, historian, writer and commentator
  - Joe Theismann, American football player
- September 10 – Bill O'Reilly, conservative political commentator
- September 13 – John W. Henry, foreign exchange advisor and Boston Red Sox owner
- September 14
  - Ed King, rock musician (Lynyrd Skynyrd) (died 2018)
  - Steve Gaines, rock guitarist (Lynyrd Skynyrd) (died 1977)
- September 15 – Joe Barton, politician
- September 16 – Ed Begley Jr. actor and environmentalist
- September 19
  - Ernie Sabella, actor
  - Barry Scheck, attorney and author
- September 21 – Artis Gilmore, basketball player
- September 23 – Bruce Springsteen, singer-songwriter
- September 26 – Jane Smiley, novelist
- September 27 – Mike Schmidt, baseball player and coach
- October 1 – Isaac Bonewits, author and occultist (died 2010)
- October 2
  - Paul D'Amato, actor (died 2024)
  - Richard Hell, musician
  - Annie Leibovitz, photographer
- October 3
  - Haunani-Kay Trask, activist, educator and poet (died 2021)
  - David Kaczynski, teacher and charity worker who was role in the arrest of Ted Kaczynski
- October 5
  - Bill James, historian and author
  - B. W. Stevenson, singer-songwriter and guitarist (died 1988)
- October 8
  - Jerry Bittle, cartoonist (died 2003)
  - Ashawna Hailey, computer scientist and philanthropist (died 2011)
  - Mark Hopkinson, mass murderer and proxy killer (d. 1992)
  - Sigourney Weaver (Susan Weaver), film actress
- October 13 – Rick Vito, musician
- October 14 – Katha Pollitt, writer
- October 15 – Tanya Roberts, actress (d. 2021)
- October 17 – Bill Hudson, singer and actor
- October 21 – LaTanya Richardson, African American actress
- October 22 – Stiv Bators, singer (The Dead Boys) (died 1990)
- October 24
  - Chester Marcol, American football player
  - John Markoff, journalist and author
  - Stan White, American football linebacker and sportscaster
- October 25 – Ross Bagdasarian Jr., film producer, record producer, singer and voice artist (son of Alvin and the Chipmunks creator Ross Bagdasarian Sr.)
- October 27 – Cheryl Keeton, murder victim (died 1986)
- October 28 – Caitlyn Jenner, decathlete and TV personality
- October 29 – Paul Orndorff, professional wrestler (died 2021)
- October 30
  - Terri Dial, banker (died 2012)
  - Dave Lebling, interactive game designer
- November 1
  - Jeannie Berlin, film actress
  - Belita Moreno, film actress
- November 2
  - Susan Carlson, politician
  - Lois McMaster Bujold, author of speculative fiction
  - Marc Elrich, politician
- November 3
  - Mike Evans, African American actor (died 2006)
- November 5 – Jimmie Spheeris, singer-songwriter (died 1984)
- November 6
  - Elwood Edwards, voice actor (died 2024)
  - Joseph C. Wilson, United States diplomat (died 2019)
- November 7 – Judi Bari, environmental activist (died 1997)
- November 8 – Bonnie Raitt, blues singer and guitarist
- November 9 – Julie Beckett, teacher and disability rights activist (died 2022)
- November 10
  - Brad Ashford, politician (died 2022)
  - Ann Reinking, actress, dancer and choreographer (died 2020)
- November 12 – Jack Reed, U.S. Senator from Rhode Island from 1997
- November 14 – James Young, hard rock singer-songwriter and guitarist (Styx)
- November 19 – Ahmad Rashad, sportscaster, television personality
- November 20 – Jeff Dowd, film producer and political activist
- November 22 – David Pietrusza, author, historian
- November 23 – Tom Joyner, radio host
- November 24 – Linda Tripp, key figure in the Clinton–Lewinsky scandal (died 2020)
- November 25 – Mike Joy, NASCAR commentator
- November 26 – Juanin Clay, actress (died 1995)
- November 29
  - Jerry Lawler, wrestler
  - Garry Shandling, comedian (died 2016)
- December 1 – Kurt Schmoke, African American lawyer and politician (Dean, Howard Law School, Mayor of Baltimore)
- December 4 – Jeff Bridges, film actor
- December 5
  - Bruce E. Melnick, astronaut
  - Lanny Wadkins, golfer
- December 6 – Doug Marlette, editorial cartoonist (died 2007)
- December 9
  - Tom Kite, golfer
  - Eileen Myles, poet and writer
- December 10 – Dick Cohen, politician, Minnesota Senate
- December 13
  - Randy Owen, country lead vocalist, rhythm guitar player
  - Tom Verlaine, rock singer, guitarist (died 2023)
- December 14 – Bill Buckner, baseball player (died 2019)
- December 15 – Don Johnson, television actor
- December 16 – Billy Gibbons, rock guitarist (ZZ Top)
- December 20
  - Cecil Cooper, baseball player and manager
  - Oscar Gamble, baseball player (died 2018)
  - Pauline Robinson Bush, daughter of the 41st president, George H. W. Bush (died 1953)
  - Claudia Jennings, model (died 1979)
- December 22 – Ray Guy, American football player (died 2022)
- December 23 – Brian J. O'Neill, politician
- December 24 – Randy Neugebauer, politician
- December 25
  - Sissy Spacek, film actress
  - Joe Louis Walker, African American electric blues musician
- December 28 – Sam Katz, politician, Philadelphia
- December 30 – Jerry Coyne, biologist

== Deaths ==
- January 6 – Victor Fleming, film director (born 1889)
- January 11 – Nelson Doubleday, publisher (born 1889)
- January 14 – Harry Stack Sullivan, psychiatrist (born 1892)
- February 1 – Herbert Stothart, composer (born 1885)
- March 7
  - Sol Bloom, politician and impresario (born 1870)
  - Bradbury Robinson, footballer who threw the first forward pass in American football history in 1906 (born 1884)
- March 17 – Felix Bressart, German American actor (born 1892)
- March 20 – Irving Fazola, jazz clarinetist (born 1912; heart attack)
- March 25 – Jack Kapp, president of the U.S. branch of Decca Records (born 1901)
- April 6 – Joseph J. Sullivan, gambler (born 1870)
- April 15 – Wallace Beery, film actor (born 1885)
- April 22 – Charles Middleton, actor (born 1874)
- May 10 – Emilio de Gogorza, baritone (born 1872)
- May 13 – Sawnie R. Aldredge, attorney and judge (born 1890)
- May 22 – James Forrestal, U.S. Secretary of Navy and Defense (born 1892)
- May 27 – Robert Ripley, creator of Ripley's Believe It or Not! (born 1890)
- June 14 – Russell Doubleday, author and publisher (born 1872)
- June 25 – Buck Freeman, baseball player (born 1871)
- July 7 – Bunk Johnson, African American jazz trumpeter (born 1879)
- July 18 – Alice Corbin Henderson, poet (born 1881)
- July 24 – Virginia M. Alexander, African American physician and community activist (born 1899)
- July 26 – Linda Arvidson, silent film actress (born 1884)
- July 27 – Ellery Harding Clark, field athlete (born 1874)
- August 9
  - Gustavus M. Blech, German American physician and surgeon (born 1870)
  - Harry Davenport, actor (born 1866)
- August 16 – Margaret Mitchell, novelist (born 1900; killed in road accident)
- August 18 – Paul Mares, dixieland jazz cornet player (born 1900; lung cancer)
- September 10 – Wiley Rutledge, U.S. Supreme Court Justice (born 1894)
- September 11 – Ellen Bird, English-born woman and Titanic survivor (born 1881)
- September 12 – Harry Burleigh, African American baritone and classical composer (born 1866)
- September 18 – Frank Morgan, character actor (born 1890)
- September 19 – Will Cuppy, humorist (born 1884)
- September 20 – Richard Dix, film actor (born 1893)
- September 22 – Sam Wood, film director (born 1883)
- September 27 – David Adler, architect (born 1882)
- October 1 – Buddy Clark, singer (born 1911; killed in aviation accident)
- October 14 – Fritz Leiber (Sr.), actor (born 1882)
- October 15 – Elmer Clifton, film actor and director (born 1890)
- October 23 – Almanzo Wilder, writer, husband of Laura Ingalls Wilder (born 1857)
- October 26 – Emil Liston, sports coach and administrator (born 1890)
- October 31 – Edward Stettinius Jr., U.S. Secretary of State (born 1900; coronary thrombosis)
- November 2 – Jerome F. Donovan, politician (born 1872)
- November 3 – Solomon R. Guggenheim, philanthropist (born 1861)
- November 25 – Bill Robinson ("Bojangles"), African American dancer (born 1878)
- December 6
  - Lead Belly (Huddie William Ledbetter), African American blues musician (born 1888)
  - Mary Margaret O'Reilly, assistant director of the United States Mint (born 1865)
- December 7 – Rex Beach, adventure novelist and Olympic water polo player (born 1877)
- December 25 – Leon Schlesinger, film producer (born 1884)
- December 28
  - Hervey Allen, novelist (born 1889)
  - Martha Atwell, radio director (b. 1900)
  - Ivie Anderson, African American jazz singer (born 1905; asthma)

== See also ==
- List of American films of 1949
- Timeline of United States history (1930–1949)
