= 1948 Missouri State Auditor election =

- November 2, 1948

Nominee	W. H. Holmes	F. Reed Grainger
Party	Democratic	Republican
Popular vote	902,854	646,467
Percentage	58.12%	41.62%
State Auditor before election
Forrest Smith
Democratic
Elected State Auditor
W. H. Holmes
Democratic

The 1948 Missouri State Auditor election was held on November 2, 1948, in order to elect the state auditor of Missouri. Democratic nominee W. H. Holmes defeated Republican nominee F. Reed Grainger, Progressive nominee George Kimmel, Socialist nominee Elizabeth Erbe and Socialist Labor nominee George B. Cross.

== General election ==
On election day, November 2, 1948, Democratic nominee W. H. Holmes won the election by a margin of 256,387 votes against his foremost opponent Republican nominee F. Reed Grainger, thereby retaining Democratic control over the office of state auditor. Holmes was sworn in as the 26th state auditor of Missouri on January 10, 1949.

=== Results ===
Missouri State Auditor election, 1948
Party	Candidate	Votes	%
Democratic	W. H. Holmes	902,854	58.12
Republican	F. Reed Grainger	646,467	41.62
Progressive	George Kimmel	2,811	0.18
Socialist	Elizabeth Erbe	1,147	0.07
Socialist Labor	George B. Cross	147	0.01
Total votes		1,553,426	100.00
Democratic hold			

== See also ==
- 1948 Missouri gubernatorial election
