= 1948 Missouri Secretary of State election =

- November 2, 1948

Nominee	Walter H. Toberman	Roy Scantlin
Party	Democratic	Republican
Popular vote	899,914	652,847
Percentage	57.91%	42.01%
Secretary of State before election
Edgar C. Nelson (Acting)
Democratic
Elected Secretary of State
Walter H. Toberman
Democratic

The 1948 Missouri Secretary of State election was held on November 2, 1948, in order to elect the secretary of state of Missouri. Democratic nominee Walter H. Toberman defeated Republican nominee Roy Scantlin and Socialist nominee Alice B. Verburg.

== General election ==
On election day, November 2, 1948, Democratic nominee Walter H. Toberman won the election by a margin of 247,067 votes against his foremost opponent Republican nominee Roy Scantlin, thereby retaining Democratic control over the office of secretary of state. Toberman was sworn in as the 29th secretary of state of Missouri on January 10, 1949.

=== Results ===
Missouri Secretary of State election, 1948
Party	Candidate	Votes	%
Democratic	Walter H. Toberman	899,914	57.91
Republican	Roy Scantlin	652,847	42.01
Socialist	Alice B. Verburg	1,119	0.08
Total votes		1,553,880	100.00
Democratic hold			

== See also ==
- 1948 Missouri gubernatorial election
