= 1944 Missouri State Auditor election =

Local Election

- November 7, 1944
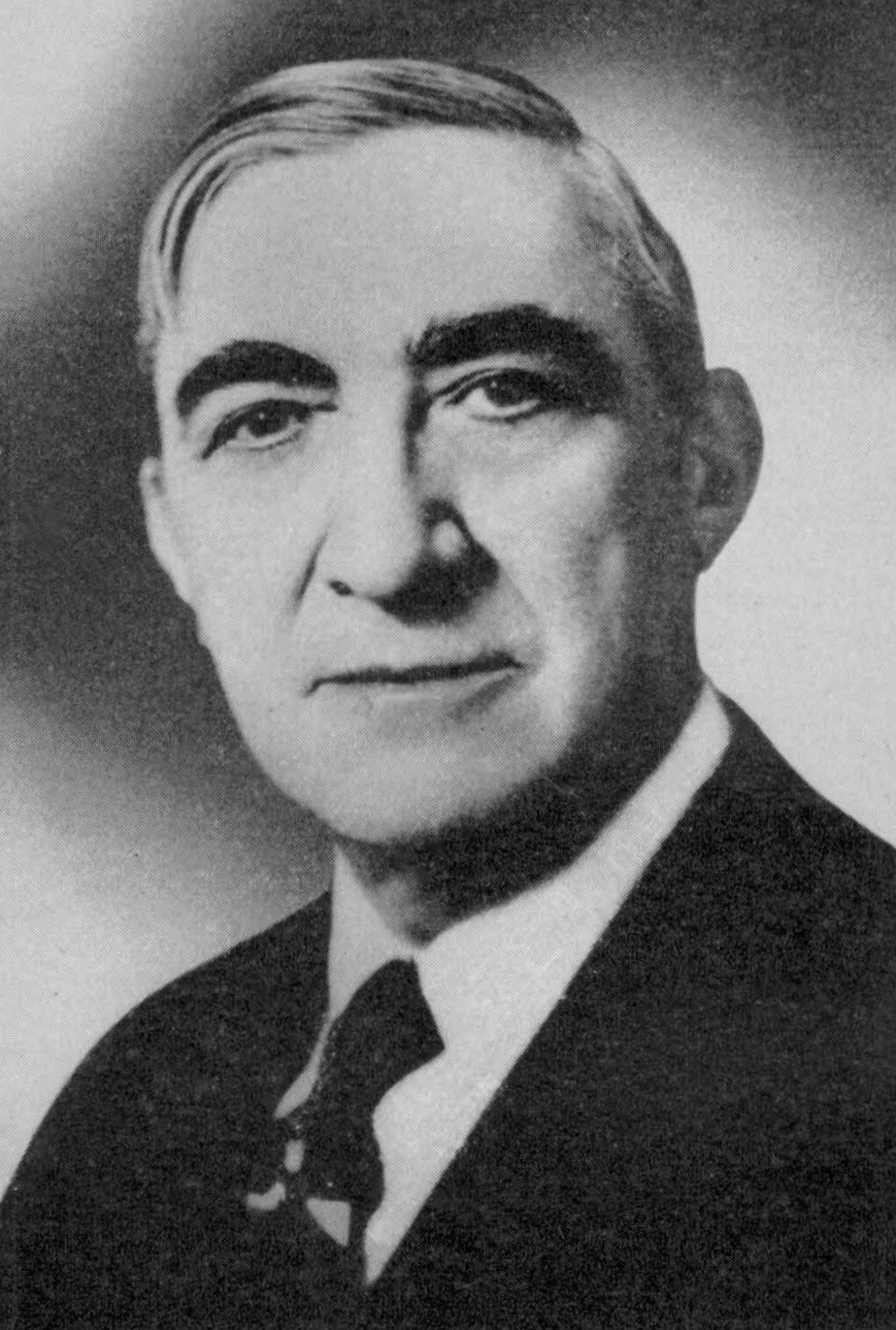

Nominee	Forrest Smith	George Metzger
Party	Democratic	Republican
Popular vote	803,708	749,566
Percentage	51.74%	48.26%
State Auditor before election
Forrest Smith
Democratic
Elected State Auditor
Forrest Smith
Democratic

The 1944 Missouri State Auditor election was held on November 7, 1944, in order to elect the state auditor of Missouri. Democratic nominee and incumbent state auditor Forrest Smith defeated Republican nominee George Metzger.

== General election ==
On election day, November 7, 1944, Democratic nominee Forrest Smith won re-election by a margin of 54,142 votes against his opponent Republican nominee George Metzger, thereby retaining Democratic control over the office of state auditor. Smith was sworn in for his fourth term on January 8, 1945.

=== Results ===
Missouri State Auditor election, 1944
Party	Candidate	Votes	%
Democratic	Forrest Smith (incumbent)	803,708	51.74
Republican	George Metzger	749,566	48.26
Total votes		1,553,274	100.00
Democratic hold			

== See also ==
- 1944 Missouri gubernatorial election
