= 1952 Missouri Secretary of State election =

Missouri election in 1952

- November 4, 1952

| Nominee | Walter H. Toberman | Ballard Watters |
| Party | Democratic | Republican |
| Popular vote | 972,993 | 881,934 |
| Percentage | 52.45% | 47.54% |
Secretary of State before election
Walter H. Toberman
Democratic
Elected Secretary of State
Walter H. Toberman
Democratic

The 1952 Missouri Secretary of State election was held on November 4, 1952, in order to elect the secretary of state of Missouri. Democratic nominee and incumbent secretary of state Walter H. Toberman defeated Republican nominee Ballard Watters and Socialist Labor nominee Karl Oberheu.

== General election ==
On election day, November 4, 1952, Democratic nominee Walter H. Toberman won re-election by a margin of 91,059 votes against his foremost opponent Republican nominee Ballard Watters, thereby retaining Democratic control over the office of secretary of state. Toberman was sworn in for his second term on January 12, 1953.

=== Results ===
Missouri Secretary of State election, 1952
| Party | Candidate | Votes | % |
|---|---|---|---|
| Democratic | Walter H. Toberman (incumbent) | 972,993 | 52.45 |
| Republican | Ballard Watters | 881,934 | 47.54 |
| Socialist Labor | Karl Oberheu | 157 | 0.01 |
| Total votes | | 1,855,084 | 100.00 |
| Democratic hold | | | |

== See also ==
- 1952 Missouri gubernatorial election
