= Clayborne =

Clayborne can be a masculine given name or a surname. Notable people with the name include:

- Clayborne Carson (born 1944), American historian
- James Clayborne Jr., American politician
- Sarah Clayborne, American chef

== See also ==
- Claiborne (disambiguation)
