= Cliburn =

Cliburn may refer to:

- Cliburn, Cumbria, England
  - Cliburn railway station
- Cliburn (surname)
  - Van Cliburn (1934–2013), American pianist
    - Van Cliburn International Piano Competition
    - Van Cliburn Foundation
