= John Claiborne (disambiguation) =

John Claiborne may refer to:

- John Claiborne (1777–1808), U.S. Representative from Virginia
- John Francis Hamtramck Claiborne (1809–1884), U.S. Representative from Mississippi
- John Herbert Claiborne (1828–1905), Surgeon and physicist
- John Claiborne (baseball executive) (born 1940), Baseball Executive
