= 1956 Missouri Secretary of State election =

- November 6, 1956

Nominee	Walter H. Toberman	Jesse E. Smith
Party	Democratic	Republican
Popular vote	971,494	819,155
Percentage	54.25%	45.75%
Secretary of State before election
Walter H. Toberman
Democratic
Elected Secretary of State
Walter H. Toberman
Democratic

The 1956 Missouri Secretary of State election was held on November 6, 1956, in order to elect the secretary of state of Missouri. Democratic nominee and incumbent secretary of state Walter H. Toberman defeated Republican nominee Jesse E. Smith.

== General election ==
On election day, November 6, 1956, Democratic nominee Walter H. Toberman won re-election by a margin of 152,339 votes against his opponent Republican nominee Jesse E. Smith, thereby retaining Democratic control over the office of secretary of state. Toberman was sworn in for his third term on January 14, 1957.

=== Results ===
Missouri Secretary of State election, 1956
Party	Candidate	Votes	%
Democratic	Walter H. Toberman (incumbent)	971,494	54.25
Republican	Jesse E. Smith	819,155	45.75
Total votes		1,790,649	100.00
Democratic hold			

== See also ==
- 1956 Missouri gubernatorial election
