= 1932 Missouri State Auditor election =

- November 8, 1932
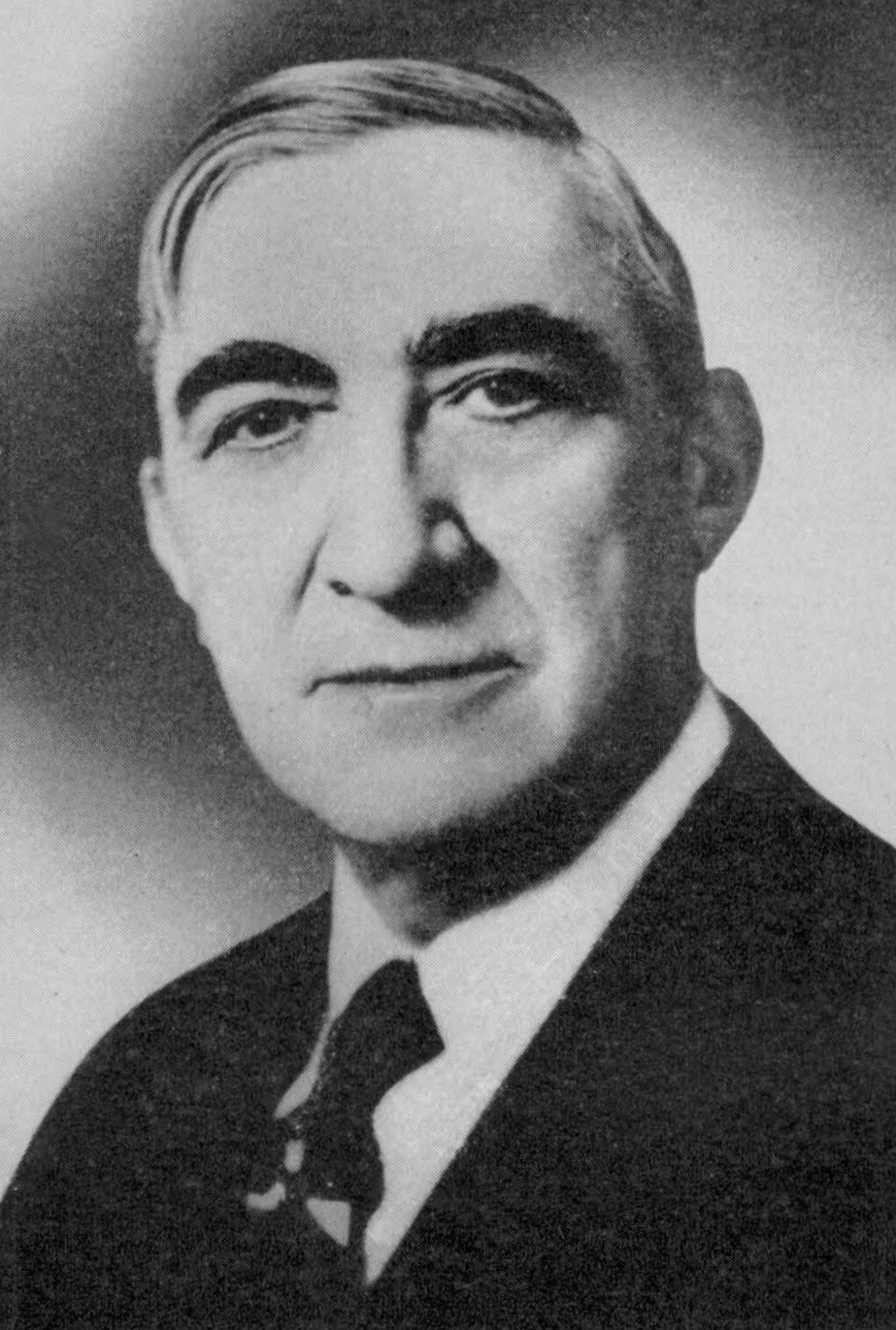

Nominee	Forrest Smith	George Ernst Hackman
Party	Democratic	Republican
Popular vote	999,044	596,056
Percentage	62.17%	37.09%
State Auditor before election
Lorenzo Dow Thompson
Republican
Elected State Auditor
Forrest Smith
Democratic

The 1932 Missouri State Auditor election was held on November 8, 1932, in order to elect the state auditor of Missouri. Democratic nominee Forrest Smith defeated Republican nominee and former state auditor George Ernst Hackman and Socialist nominee D. C. Miller.

== General election ==
On election day, November 8, 1932, Democratic nominee Forrest Smith won the election by a margin of 402,988 votes against his foremost opponent Republican nominee George Ernst Hackman, thereby gaining Democratic control over the office of state auditor. Smith was sworn in as the 25th state auditor of Missouri on January 9, 1933.

=== Results ===
Missouri State Auditor election, 1932
Party	Candidate	Votes	%
Democratic	Forrest Smith	999,044	62.17
Republican	George Ernst Hackman	596,056	37.09
Socialist	D. C. Miller	11,837	0.74
Total votes		1,606,937	100.00
Democratic gain from Republican			

== See also ==
- 1932 Missouri gubernatorial election
