= 1940 Missouri State Auditor election =

- November 5, 1940
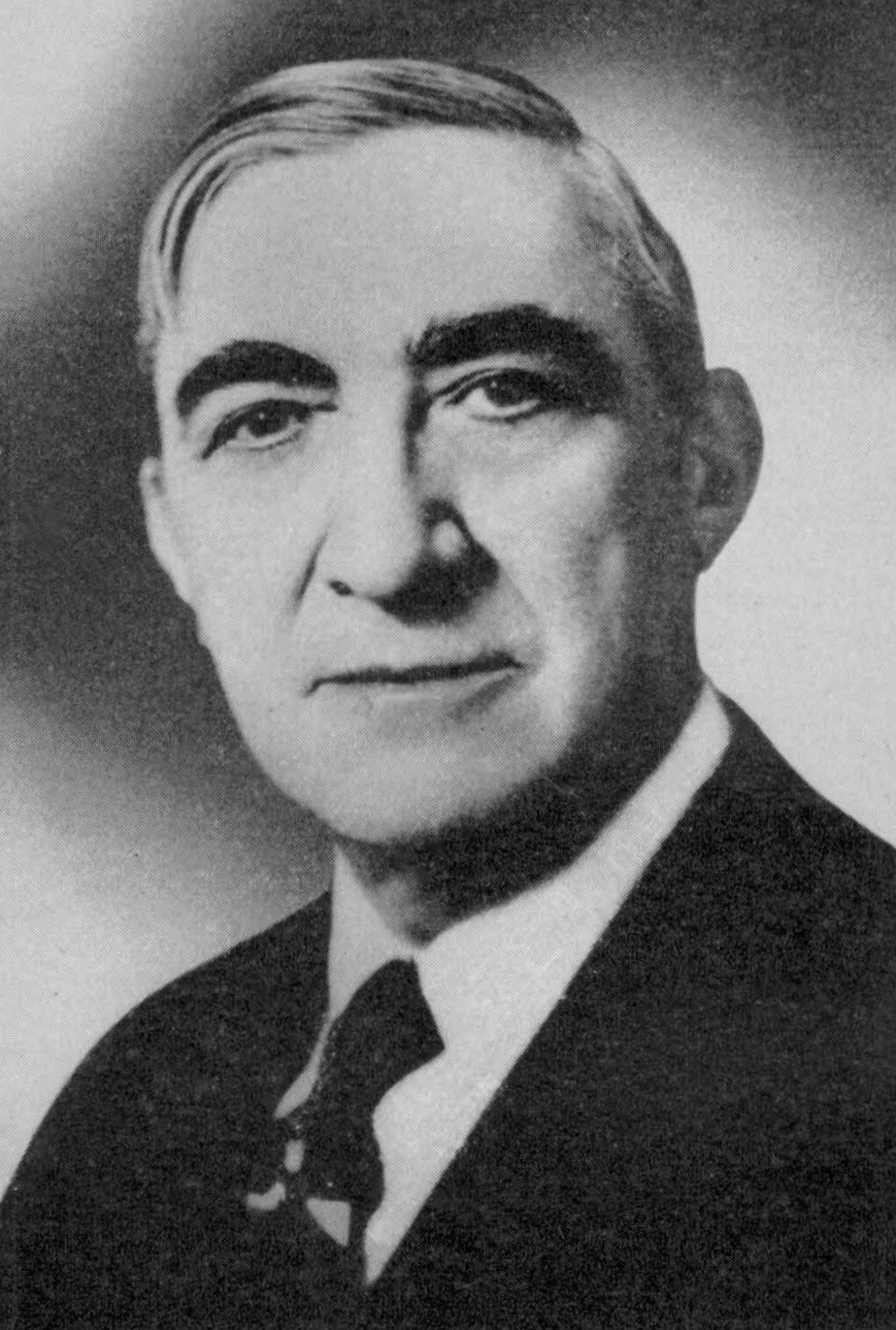

Nominee	Forrest Smith	J. T. Waddill
Party	Democratic	Republican
Popular vote	960,623	854,857
Percentage	52.87%	47.05%
State Auditor before election
Forrest Smith
Democratic
Elected State Auditor
Forrest Smith
Democratic

The 1940 Missouri State Auditor election was held on November 5, 1940, in order to elect the state auditor of Missouri. Democratic nominee and incumbent state auditor Forrest Smith defeated Republican nominee J. T. Waddill and Socialist nominee Helen Nichols.

== General election ==
On election day, November 5, 1940, Democratic nominee Forrest Smith won re-election by a margin of 105,766 votes against his foremost opponent Republican nominee J. T. Waddill, thereby retaining Democratic control over the office of state auditor. Smith was sworn in for his third term on January 13, 1941.

=== Results ===
Missouri State Auditor election, 1940
Party	Candidate	Votes	%
Democratic	Forrest Smith (incumbent)	960,623	52.87
Republican	J. T. Waddill	854,857	47.05
Socialist	Helen Nichols	1,621	0.08
Total votes		1,817,101	100.00
Democratic hold			

== See also ==
- 1940 Missouri gubernatorial election
