= 1944 Missouri Attorney General election =

- November 7, 1944

Nominee	Jonathan E. Taylor	George H. Miller
Party	Democratic	Republican
Popular vote	787,878	761,191
Percentage	50.86%	49.14%
Attorney General before election
Roy McKittrick
Democratic
Elected Attorney General
Jonathan E. Taylor
Democratic

The 1944 Missouri Attorney General election was held on November 7, 1944, in order to elect the attorney general of Missouri. Democratic nominee Jonathan E. Taylor defeated Republican nominee and incumbent member of the Missouri Senate George H. Miller.

== General election ==
On election day, November 7, 1944, Democratic nominee Jonathan E. Taylor won the election by a margin of 26,687 votes against his opponent Republican nominee George H. Miller, thereby retaining Democratic control over the office of attorney general. Taylor was sworn in as the 33rd attorney general of Missouri on January 8, 1945.

=== Results ===
Missouri Attorney General election, 1944
Party	Candidate	Votes	%
Democratic	Jonathan E. Taylor	787,878	50.86
Republican	George H. Miller	761,191	49.14
Total votes		1,549,069	100.00
Democratic hold			

== See also ==
- 1944 Missouri gubernatorial election
