= 1948 Missouri Attorney General election =

- November 2, 1948

| Nominee | Jonathan E. Taylor | Herbert Douglas |
| Party | Democratic | Republican |
| Popular vote | 900,943 | 648,553 |
| Percentage | 58.04% | 41.78% |
Attorney General before election
Jonathan E. Taylor
Democratic
Elected Attorney General
Jonathan E. Taylor
Democratic

The 1948 Missouri Attorney General election was held on November 2, 1948, in order to elect the attorney general of Missouri. Democratic nominee and incumbent attorney general Jonathan E. Taylor defeated Republican nominee Herbert Douglas and Progressive nominee Douglas MacLeod.

== General election ==
On election day, November 2, 1948, Democratic nominee Jonathan E. Taylor won re-election by a margin of 252,390 votes against his foremost opponent Republican nominee Herbert Douglas, thereby retaining Democratic control over the office of attorney general. Taylor was sworn in for his second term on January 10, 1949.

=== Results ===
Missouri Attorney General election, 1948
| Party | Candidate | Votes | % |
|---|---|---|---|
| Democratic | Jonathan E. Taylor (incumbent) | 900,943 | 58.04 |
| Republican | Herbert Douglas | 648,553 | 41.78 |
| Progressive | Douglas MacLeod | 2,889 | 0.18 |
| Total votes | | 1,552,385 | 100.00 |
| Democratic hold | | | |

== See also ==
- 1948 Missouri gubernatorial election
