= 1936 Missouri State Auditor election =

- November 3, 1936
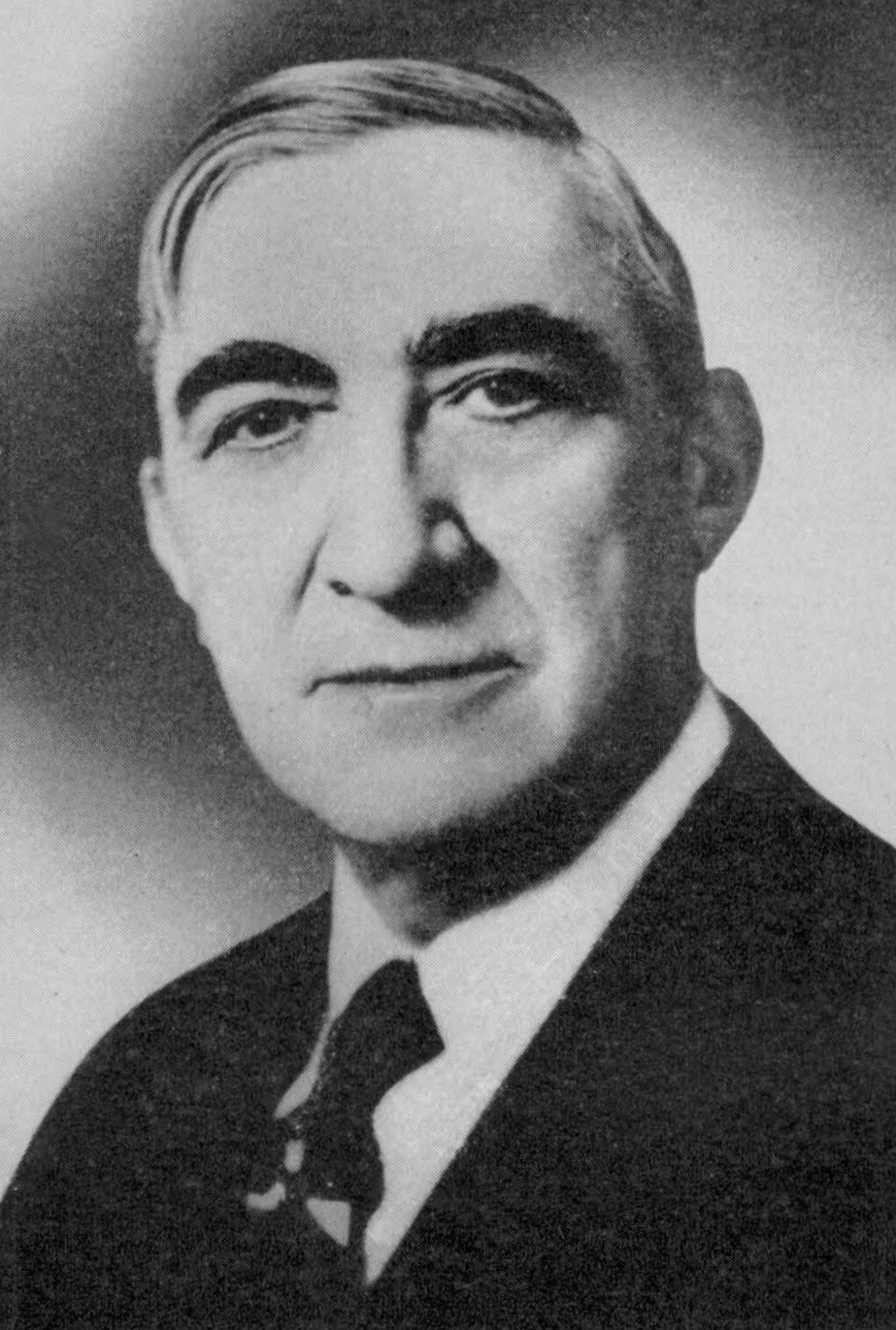

Nominee	Forrest Smith	George Ernst Hackman
Party	Democratic	Republican
Popular vote	1,099,812	706,904
Percentage	60.85%	39.11%
State Auditor before election
Forrest Smith
Democratic
Elected State Auditor
Forrest Smith
Democratic

The 1936 Missouri State Auditor election was held on November 3, 1936, in order to elect the state auditor of Missouri. Democratic nominee and incumbent state auditor Forrest Smith defeated Republican nominee and former state auditor George Ernst Hackman, Communist nominee Jesse Alspaugh and Socialist Labor nominee James Wagoner.

== General election ==
On election day, November 3, 1936, Democratic nominee Forrest Smith won re-election by a margin of 392,908 votes against his foremost opponent Republican nominee George Ernst Hackman, thereby retaining Democratic control over the office of state auditor. Smith was sworn in for his second term on January 11, 1937.

=== Results ===
Missouri State Auditor election, 1936
Party	Candidate	Votes	%
Democratic	Forrest Smith (incumbent)	1,099,812	60.85
Republican	George Ernst Hackman	706,904	39.11
Communist	Jesse Alspaugh	379	0.02
Socialist Labor	James Wagoner	373	0.02
Total votes		1,807,468	100.00
Democratic hold			

== See also ==
- 1936 Missouri gubernatorial election
