= Claiborne Gregory =

American politician (1920–2006)

Member of the Virginia House of Delegates for Hanover and King William
- In office January 11, 1956 – January 8, 1958
- Preceded by: Edmund T. DeJarnette
- Succeeded by: Robert R. Gwathmey III

Personal details
- Born: Clairborne Duncan Gregory; January 12, 1920
- Died: December 20, 2006 (aged 86)
- Resting place: Fork Church Cemetery
- Spouse: Norine Dickson Campbell (m. 1945)
- Children: 3
- Education: Randolph–Macon College (BA)
- Occupation: Politician

Military service
- Branch/service: United States Navy; Naval Reserve
- Years of service: 1943–1956
- Battles/wars: World War II; Pacific theater; Korean War

Claiborne Duncan Gregory (January 12, 1920 – December 20, 2006) was an American politician from Virginia. He served as a member of the Virginia House of Delegates from 1956 to 1957.

== Early life ==
Claiborne Duncan Gregory was born on January 12, 1920, to Henry Claiborne Gregory. His father was a reverend. His grandfather was Richard Claiborne Gregory. He graduated from Randolph–Macon College with a Bachelor of Arts in 1943. He was a member of Kappa Sigma. He was commissioned as a naval officer by United States Naval Reserve Midshipmen's School at Northwestern University.

== Career ==
Gregory served in the U.S. Navy from 1943 to 1956. He served in World War II and served in the Pacific Theater, the Okinawa Campaign and in the Battle of Leyte Gulf. He also served in the Korean War. He attained the rank of lieutenant commander.

Gregory was a Democrat. He succeeded Edmund T. DeJarnette as a member of the Virginia House of Delegates, representing Hanover and King William counties. He served from 1956 to 1957. He was a director of the Virginia Petroleum Industries from 1958 to 1975.

== Personal life ==
Gregory married Norine Dickson Campbell, daughter of Leslie Dunlop Campbell, on September 1, 1945, at Fork Church. They had two daughters and a son, Fleet, Anne and Claiborne Jr. He was a vestryman and senior warden of Fork Church.

Gregory died on December 20, 2006. He was buried in Fork Church Cemetery.
