= 1952 Missouri gubernatorial election =

- November 4, 1952
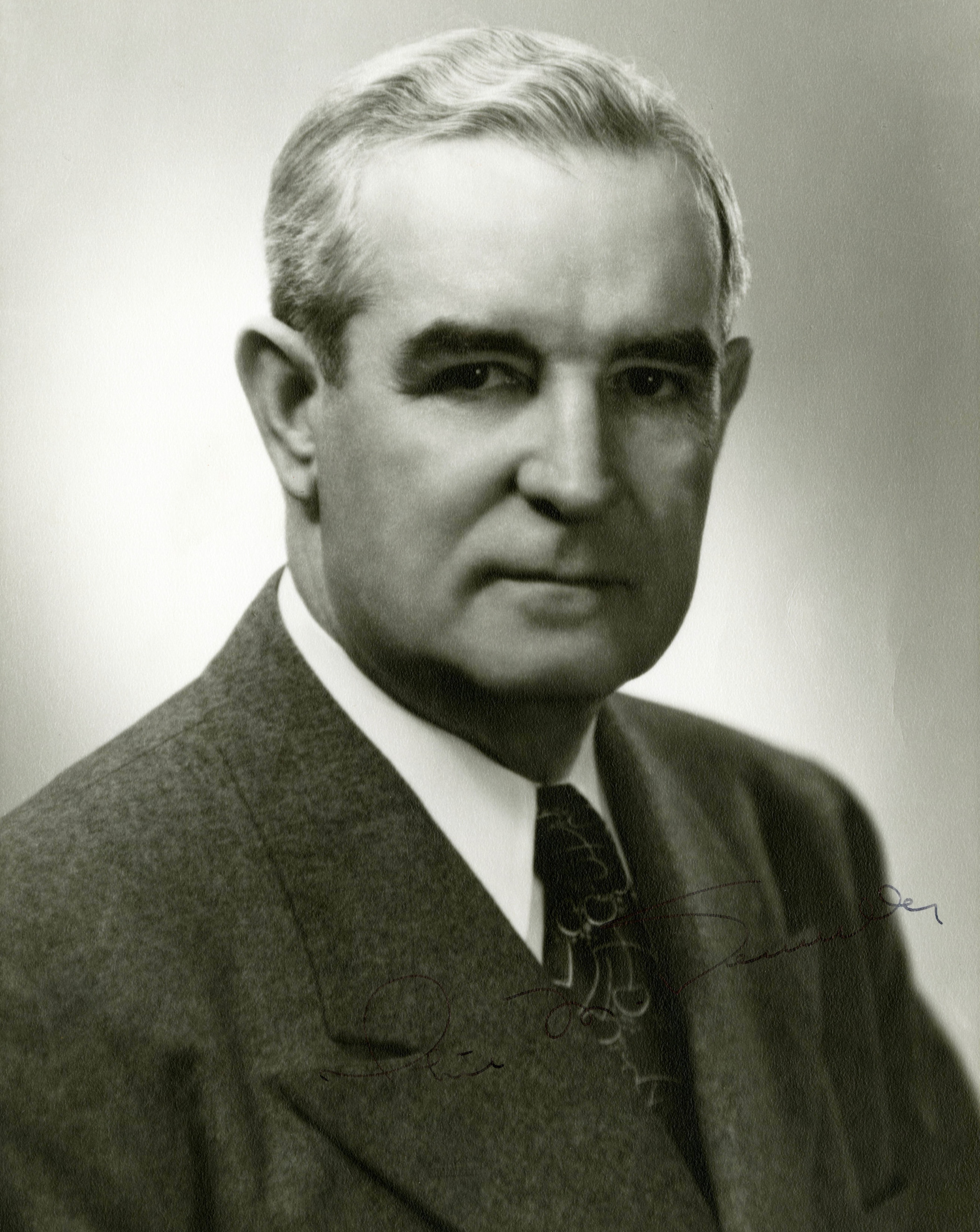

Nominee	Phil M. Donnelly	Howard Elliott
Party	Democratic	Republican
Popular vote	983,166	886,370
Percentage	52.55%	47.37%
- County results Donnelly: 50–60% 60–70% 70–80% 80–90% Elliott: 50–60% 60–70% 70–80% 80–90%
Governor before election
Forrest Smith
Democratic
Elected Governor
Phil M. Donnelly
Democratic

The 1952 Missouri gubernatorial election was held on November 4, 1952, and resulted in a victory for the Democratic nominee, former Governor Phil M. Donnelly, over the Republican candidate, former Speaker of the Missouri House of Representatives Howard Elliott, and candidates representing the Progressive, Socialist and Socialist Labor parties. Donnelly defeated representative Phil J. Welch for his party's nomination.

== Results ==
1952 gubernatorial election, Missouri
Party	Candidate	Votes	%	±%
Democratic	Phil M. Donnelly	983,166	52.55	−4.43
Republican	Howard Elliott	886,370	47.37	+4.62
Progressive	Howard Edsell	911	0.05	−0.13
Socialist	Maurice R. Wheeler	316	0.02	−0.05
Christian Nationalist	Don Lohbeck	195	0.01	+0.01
Socialist Labor	Clara "Mrs. Anthony" Hayes	138	0.01	±0.00
Majority		96,796	5.17	−9.06
Turnout		1,871,096	47.31	+5.90
Democratic hold		Swing		
