= Robert Claiborne =

American writer and musician (1919–1990)

Robert Watson Claiborne Jr.
- Born: 1919
- Died: 1990 (aged 70–71)
- Occupations: Writer; Folk singer; labor organizer
- Known for: Popular science and linguistics writing
- Spouses: Adrienne Claiborne; Sybil Claiborne
- Children: 2
- Parent: Virginia McKenney Claiborne
- Relatives: John Herbert Claiborne (grandfather)

Robert Watson Claiborne Jr. (1919–1990) was an American writer, folk singer, and labor organizer.

== Early life ==
Robert Claiborne was born in 1919 and was the grandson of John Herbert Claiborne and son of Virginia McKenney Claiborne, a women's education advocate and museum director.

== Career ==
He was a folk singer and union organizer in the 1940s and 1950s. He travelled and performed with fellow folk musicians including Pete Seeger, Woody Guthrie, and Lead Belly. Along with his first wife, Adrienne Claiborne, he wrote the song Listen Mr. Bilbo and several others, and hosted a folk radio show for a time.

As the Claibornes started a family, they both turned to writing to support it. Robert became an editor at Scientific American, only to lose his job in 1960 after the FBI visited and pointed out to the senior staff that he had been called before the House Un-American Activities Committee hearings as an ex-communist, and had refused to testify. They also pointed out that he was agitating against the then nascent Vietnam War, something often frowned upon in the early 1960s. In 1968, he signed the "Writers and Editors War Tax Protest" pledge, vowing to refuse tax payments in protest against the Vietnam War.

After losing his job, Claiborne found bread and butter work writing and editing some of the famous Time-Life series of science books. Among those he was a primary contributor to were The First Americans, The Birth of Writing, and Time. He also wrote a column for many years for Hospital Practice magazine. And he wrote or edited sections of highly-technical textbooks like Cell Membranes.

In the mid-sixties, he divorced and remarried, to short story writer, novelist and political activist Sybil Claiborne.

=== Science and linguistics ===
Starting in the 1970s, Claiborne embarked on a series of independent book projects again focusing on science for the layman. One of the first: Climate, Man and History, was translated into many languages and became a seminal work in the canon of climate-anthropology. Another, God or Beast was also well received. The two of these together formed part of a matrix of work by many 'popular science' authors in the 1970s and 1980s that was at least partly responsible for the genesis of later popular science blockbusters by other authors, like the recent Guns, Germs and Steel by Jared Diamond.

During this period, Claiborne also wrote books on amateur astronomy (The Summer Stargazer) and marine biology, humanity's impact on the marine eco-system, and its impact on human development (On Every Side of the Sea), as well as several others.

Late in life, Claiborne turned to another lifelong interest: linguistics in general and the English language in particular. His Our Marvelous Native Tongue (also called The Life and Times of the English Language) is a well-known book about the origins and evolution of English, spanning subjects as diverse as the Indo-Europeans, the Saxons, the King James Bible, Pidgin English, and African American Vernacular English (formerly called 'Ebonics').

During this late period, he also produced Saying What You Mean, a practical guide for writers, researched by his daughter, Amanda Claiborne; the less well-received Roots of English, which included a 're-assembled' hypothetical Indo-European dictionary; and Loose Cannons and Red Herrings: a book of lost metaphors, about metaphors that have merged into common usage to the point that the source of their meaning is obscured.

== Death ==
He died of a sudden heart attack in early 1990. He is survived by two children: Amanda Claiborne and Samuel Claiborne.
