= Edmund DeJarnette (politician) =

American politician

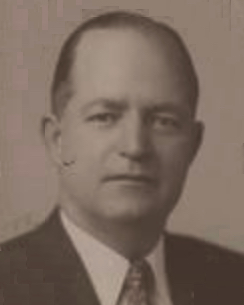

Member of the Virginia House of Delegates for Hanover and King William
- In office January 14, 1942 – January 11, 1956
- Preceded by: Leon M. Bazile
- Succeeded by: Claiborne Gregory
- In office January 10, 1934 – January 8, 1936
- Preceded by: J. Brantley Bray
- Succeeded by: Leon M. Bazile

Personal details
- Born: Edmund Tompkins DeJarnette; August 22, 1897 Caroline County, Virginia, U.S.
- Died: July 13, 1966 (aged 68) Richmond, Virginia, U.S.
- Resting place: Hollywood Cemetery
- Party: Democratic
- Spouse(s): Emily Carter (m. 1934; died 1956) Rosamond Berry (m. 1957)
- Children: Edmund DeJarnette, Jane
- Education: Randolph–Macon College

Edmund Tompkins DeJarnette (August 22, 1897 – July 13, 1966) was an American politician who was elected to eight terms in the Virginia House of Delegates. In 1955, while serving as majority floor leader of the House, he was defeated in a Democratic primary challenge by Claiborne Gregory.

As of October 25, 1955, DeJarnette was a member of the Virginia Advisory Legislative Council.

DeJarnette and his wife died on July 13, 1966, in a car accident on Interstate 95 in Richmond. He was buried in Hollywood Cemetery. His son, Edmund DeJarnette Jr., was a career Foreign Service Officer with the United States Department of State.
