= Howard Elliott (Missouri politician) =

American lawyer and politician

Speaker of the Missouri House of Representatives
- In office 1943–1947
- Preceded by: Morris E. Osborn
- Succeeded by: Murray E. Thompson

Personal details
- Born: June 29, 1904 Ladue, Missouri, U.S.
- Died: May 22, 1985 (aged 80)
- Party: Republican
- Education: Columbia University; Washington University School of Law

Howard Elliott (June 29, 1904 – May 22, 1985) was an American lawyer and Republican politician from Missouri.

Elliott was born in Ladue, Missouri in 1904. He attended Columbia University and received his law degree from Washington University in St. Louis.

== Political career ==
He was elected to the Missouri House of Representatives in 1936, and served as a representative from Ladue from 1937 to 1953. During his time as representative, he served as the Speaker of the Missouri House of Representatives from 1943 to 1947.

Howard Elliott chose not to stand for re-election to the legislature in favor of running for governor of Missouri in the 1952 election. He easily won the Republican primary, but was then defeated in the general election by former Governor Phil M. Donnelly.

Party political offices
Preceded by Murray Thompson	Republican nominee for Governor of Missouri; 1952	Succeeded by Lon Hocker
Preceded by Morris E. Osborn	Speaker of the Missouri House of Representatives; 1943–1947	Succeeded by Murray E. Thompson
