= Sybil Claiborne =

American novelist

- Born: November 1, 1929; Liverpool, Lancashire, UK
- Died: December 16, 1992

Sybil Claiborne (November 1, 1923 – December 16, 1992) was an American novelist, short story writer, pacifist and member of the Board of the War Resisters League, and antiwar activist. She published stories in magazines like The New Yorker and Esquire.

Some of her writing was the basis for a program of comedy-dramas performed in Manhattan in 1978 at Symphony Space. Her collection of short stories, Loose Connections, was published by Academy Chicago in 1988, and a novel, A Craving for Women, was published by Dutton in 1989. Her final book, In the Garden of Dead Cars, nominated for a feminist science fiction James Tiptree, Jr. Award, is a dystopian novel about a New York City plagued by insects and a Fascist government, was published in 1993.

She was close friends with writer Grace Paley who dedicated her Collected Stories to Claiborne "my colleague in the Writing and Mother Trade... we talked and talked for nearly 40 years. Then she died. Three days before that, she said slowly, with the delicacy of an unsatisfied person with only a dozen words left, Grace, the real question is, how are we to live our lives?"
