= Claiborne County =

Claiborne County is the name of more than one county in the United States:

- Claiborne County, Mississippi
- Claiborne County, Tennessee

== See also ==
- Claiborne Parish, Louisiana
