= Fork Church =

Historic church in Virginia, US

- U.S. National Register of Historic Places
- Virginia Landmarks Register
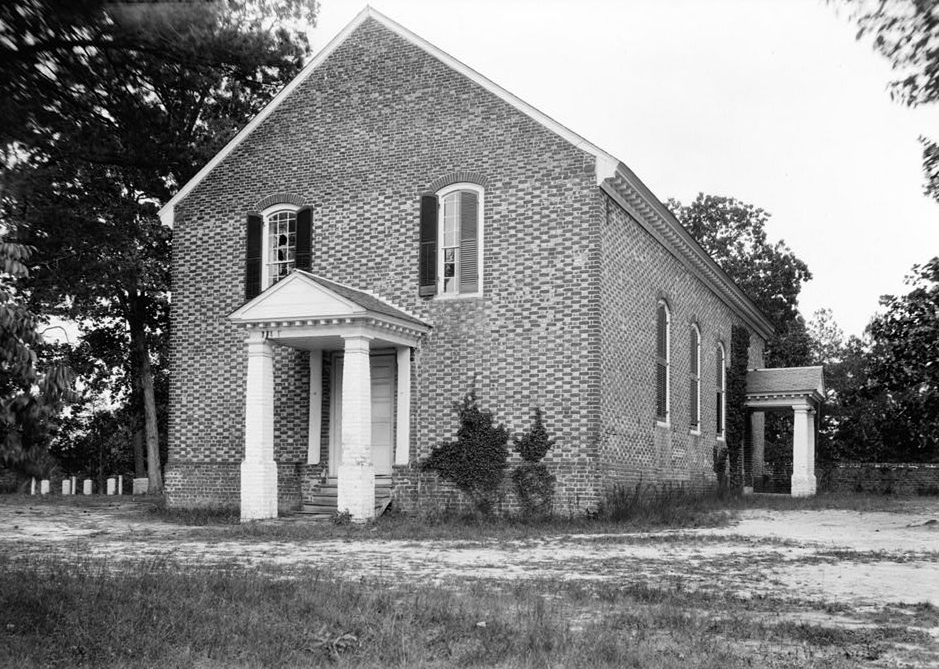

- Location within Virginia Location within the United States
- Location: Jct. of VA 738 and VA 658, near Ashland, Virginia
- Coordinates: 37°51′13″N 77°31′54″W
- Area: 10 acres (4.0 ha)
- Built: 1736
- NRHP reference No.: 70000801
- VLR No.: 042-0012

Significant dates
- Added to NRHP: February 26, 1970
- Designated VLR: December 2, 1970

Fork Church is a historic Episcopal church located near Ashland, Hanover County, Virginia. It was built in 1736, and is a one-story, gable roofed brick building. It measures approximately 34 feet by 74 feet and has walls 22 inches thick. The front facade features a small pedimented porch supported on square brick columns, both probably added in the early-19th century. Also on the property is a contributing church cemetery. Among the more-notable persons who often attended services at Fork Church were Patrick Henry, Dolley Madison, and the novelist Thomas Nelson Page. From 1893 to 1903, Fork Church's rector was the Reverend S. S. Hepburn, grandfather of actress Katharine Hepburn.

It was listed on the National Register of Historic Places in 1970.
