= Walter H. Toberman =

American politician

29th Secretary of State of Missouri
- In office 1949–1960
- Governor: Forrest Smith; Phil M. Donnelly; James T. Blair Jr.
- Preceded by: Edgar C. Nelson
- Succeeded by: Robert W. Crawford

Personal details
- Born: April 19, 1879; Fillmore, Illinois, U.S.
- Died: February 13, 1960 (aged 80)
- Political party: Democratic

Walter H. Toberman (April 19, 1879 – February 13, 1960) was an American politician. He served as secretary of state of Missouri from 1949 to 1960.

== Life and career ==
Toberman was born in Fillmore, Illinois. He was a St. Louis city official.

Toberman served as secretary of state of Missouri from 1949 to 1960.

Toberman died in February 1960 of cancer, at the age of 80.
