= Claiborne, Virginia =

Unincorporated community in Virginia, United States

Coordinates: 38°09′35″N 77°27′20″W

Claiborne is an unincorporated community in Caroline County, in the U.S. state of Virginia.
