= Terri Dial =

American banker (1949–2012)

- Born: Terri Arlene Dial; October 30, 1949; Miami, Florida, U.S.
- Died: February 28, 2012 (aged 62); Miami, Florida, U.S.
- Education: Northwestern University (BS)
- Occupations: Vice Chairman of Wells Fargo; Retail banker for Lloyds; Leader of Citigroup's North American consumer banking business and global head of Citigroup’s consumer strategy
- Known for: Revamping Citigroup's North American consumer banking business during the Great Recession; Making changes at Wells Fargo that made it one of the most successful United States banks
- Spouse: Brian Burry (1980-2012)

Terri Arlene Dial (October 30, 1949 – February 28, 2012) was an American banker. She was the Vice Chairman of Wells Fargo from 1996 to 1998, the head of Lloyds' United Kingdom retail division from 2005 to 2008, and the leader of Citigroup's North American consumer banking business and global head of the company’s consumer strategy from 2008 to 2010.

Dial is known for revamping Citigroup's North American consumer banking business during the Great Recession and for making changes at Wells Fargo that made it one of the most successful banks in the United States. Dial was nicknamed the "Human Cyclone" when she worked for Wells Fargo due to her fierce work schedule. During her career in finance, she was one of the few top executives at a Fortune 500 company.

In 2007, The Telegraph ranked Dial 27th on its list of the 50 most influential Americans in Britain during her time in London, in 2008, The Wall Street Journal ranked her 17th on its list of "The 50 Women to Watch", in 2009, Forbes ranked her 73rd on its list of "The 100 Most Powerful Women", and also in 2009, American Banker ranked her 10th on its list of "women to watch".

== Biography ==
=== Early life and education ===
Terri Arlene Dial was born on October 30, 1949, in Miami, Florida, and grew up in Miami. She graduated from Northwestern University with a bachelor's degree in political science in 1971.

=== Career ===
In 1973, Dial started working as a bank teller at a Wells Fargo branch in San Francisco. In 1980, Dial was elected Vice president of Wells Fargo. In 1989, Dial became Executive Vice president of Wells Fargo, oversaw a small business lending, and was responsible for loans and banking services to small businesses in the United States. Dial was Vice Chairman of the company from 1996 until 1998 when Wells Fargo merged with Norwest Corporation. Dial retired from Wells Fargo in 2001, having made changes at Wells Fargo that made it one of the most successful United States banks. Also in 2001, she became the Chairman of search advertising company LookSmart and also served on several other corporate boards.

In 2004, Dial told The Wall Street Journal in an article why women struggle to advance in the workplace, "Women will work themselves to death in the belief that if they do more and more, that will get them ahead, when it isn't so."

Dial moved to London in 2005 and became the head of Lloyds' United Kingdom retail division on June 1, 2005. The British press took notice of her fierce work schedule and reported that she had been known as the "Human Cyclone" among her colleagues at Wells Fargo. In an interview with American Banker in 2006, Dial welcomed the nickname, saying, "I don't know where the nickname came from, but it's not a bad thing." Dial resigned from Lloyds in late March 2008.

Dial was hired by Citigroup in December 2007 and in the summer of 2008, she was recruited by then-CEO of Citigroup, Vikram Pandit, to lead their North American consumer banking business and also become the global head of the company’s consumer strategy. Dial then revamped Citigroup's North American consumer banking business during the Great Recession. In late 2009, there were reports that an outside review of Citigroup's management that was ordered by United States regulators had questioned Dial's management skills. Citigroup declined to address the reports and Dial stepped down in January 2010, citing personal reasons, and became a senior adviser at Citigroup.

Dial was also involved in philanthropic projects, including nonprofit organizations Citymeals-on-Wheels and Legal Momentum.

=== Health issues and death ===
In 2010, Dial went to a doctor in Manhattan for what she thought was the "stomach flu", but after visiting a Gastroenterologist, it was discovered that she had a pancreatic tumor. After finding out about her tumor, she went through surgery, months of infections, and pneumonia, which delayed her chemotherapy.

Terri Dial died of pancreatic cancer on February 28, 2012, in Miami in a hospice. Vikram Pandit sent a message to Citigroup's employees on February 29 that confirmed her death.

== Personal life ==
Dial met her husband Brian Burry during a management training session at Wells Fargo. They married in 1980 and travelled to more than 100 countries together, including Myanmar, Canada, and India.

== Awards and honors ==
- Financial Woman of the Year Award from the Financial Women's Association of San Francisco (1996)
