= Theresa Claiborne =

First African American woman pilot in the U.S. Air Force

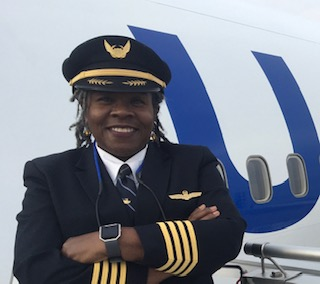
- Born: 1959
- Alma mater: Laughlin Air Force Base; California State University, Sacramento
- Employer: United Airlines (1990–2024)
- Branch: United States Air Force (1982–2003)

Theresa M. Claiborne (* 1959) is American Veteran and Airline Captain. On June 20, 1981, she became the first female African-American pilot to serve in the United States Air Force (USAF).

== Education ==
Claiborne came from a military family and she went to California State University, Sacramento where she joined the Air Force Reserve Officers' Training Corps (ROTC). She realized she wanted to be a pilot while in the ROTC program. She completed her Undergraduate Pilot Training at Laughlin Air Force Base, Texas, in 1982.

== Career ==
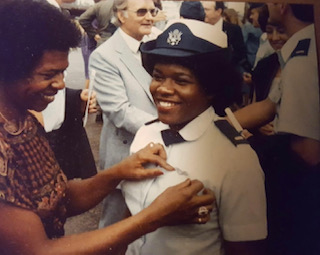
Theresa Claiborne having her wings pinned on by her mother

On June 20, 1981, Claiborne was commissioned as second lieutenant in the USAF, graduating from Laughlin Air Force Base on September 16, 1982 with the class 82-08. Claiborne flew KC–135 Stratotankers for Strategic Air Command for seven years. She left active duty in 1988. She served as an instructor pilot on the KC-135E and a flight commander for the USAF Reserves where she rose to the rank of lieutenant colonel. Claiborne also began working for United Airlines as a first officer in 1990. She would later be promoted to captain. She retired from the military on January 6, 2003 with over 3000 military flight hours.

In 2016, Claiborne co-founded the organization Sisters of the Skies with pilots Christine Angel Hughes and Nia Wordlaw. Sisters of the Skies' mission is to support and build a more diverse next generation of aviation professionals by offering workshops, mentorships, and scholarships. She flew her final flight then retired on May 23, 2024.

== Awards ==
Claiborne was inducted into the Organization of Black Aerospace Professionals Hall of Fame in 2017.
