= Cliburn (surname) =

- Gender: Unisex
- Language: English

Origin
- Language: English
- Origin: Cliburn

Other names
- Variant form: Clibburn
- See also: Claiborne

Cliburn is a surname in the English language. The name originated as a habitational name (from Cliburn, Cumbria, England).

This place name is derived from the two Old English elements: the first, clif, meaning "slope" or "bank"; the second, burna, meaning "stream". A variant of the surname is Clibburn. Early records of the name include de Clebern, in 1364; and Clibburn, in 1475. In some cases the surname Claiborne may also be a variant of Cliburn, however, the surname is generally found in Norfolk, and other areas in the south-east. Claiborne, like Cliburn, is a habitational name, although it is derived from two Old English elements meaning (first) "clay" and (second) "spring" or "stream".

== People with the name ==
- Van Cliburn (1934–2013), American pianist
- Stan Cliburn (born 1956), American baseball player
- Stew Cliburn (born 1956), American baseball player
