= Sarah Clayborne =

American chef

Sarah Clayborne (born May 1, 1949) also known as The Pie Lady is a pie chef, restaurateur, and community activist in Memphis, Tennessee.

== Early life ==
Clayborne was born Beverly Jean Williams on May 1, 1949, in Chicago, Illinois, U.S. She started to cook at age five, learning to cook pies from her grandmother. In 1982, she moved to Memphis, Tennessee, after a failed marriage.

== Unified Effort Development ==
While living in Memphis, Clayborne founded and developed Unified Effort Development (UED) with the assistance of the Institute of Cultural Affairs, the Center for Neighborhoods, The Boys and Girls Club, and Lemoyne College. In less than six months, U.E.D. became the number one neighborhood in the nation. Margaret Craddock, the director of Memphis' Metropolitan Inter-Faith Association (MIFA), encouraged Clayborne to submit the application to Neighborhood USA for this National Award.

Clayborne was the first recipient of the award from Neighborhood USA, selected from eleven finalists. At the annual award conference, one of the attendees removed the napkin from the bread basket and put in a quarter; others in the room did the same the one hundred and fifty dollars was raised. After this, she was invited to Tennessee State University (TSU) on August 21, 1984, as the Keynote Speaker. She continued service to the community from the new headquarters for UED until 1985. In 1985, Clayborne changed her name to Sarah.

== Culinary career ==
On September 29, 1987, her third daughter, Eugenia L. Binkins, was shot in the head during a robbery in Memphis Glenview Park. She survived but was paralyzed and could not talk or swallow. In addition, she was two months pregnant. Clayborne had recently graduated from the Memphis Culinary Academy and began selling pies out of her house to pay for her daughter's nursing home care. Her gave her pies names like Amen Pie (walnuts and chocolate), Hosanna, Hosanna (chocolate, almonds and coconut), and Glory Hallelujah (pears and apples with a lemon glaze). Her pies were purchased by actor Tom Cruise, director Sydney Pollack, state senator Steve Cohen, and opera star Kallen Esperian., and are sold at several local restaurants

In 1990, Clayborne opened a luncheonette specializing in pies, and moved to a larger location in 1993. Also in 1993, Clayborne was featured by People Magazine. After that story, demand for her pies quadrupled (according to Clayborne), and the publishing house William Morrow expressed an interest in putting out a cookbook of her recipes.

Clayborne has baked her pies for charities such as Youth Villages' Soup Sunday and Phineas Newborn Family Foundation. In addition, she has worked for the Center for Independent Living and created the Saveahoe Foundation to provide job training to prostitutes.
