= 1944 Missouri gubernatorial election =

- November 7, 1944
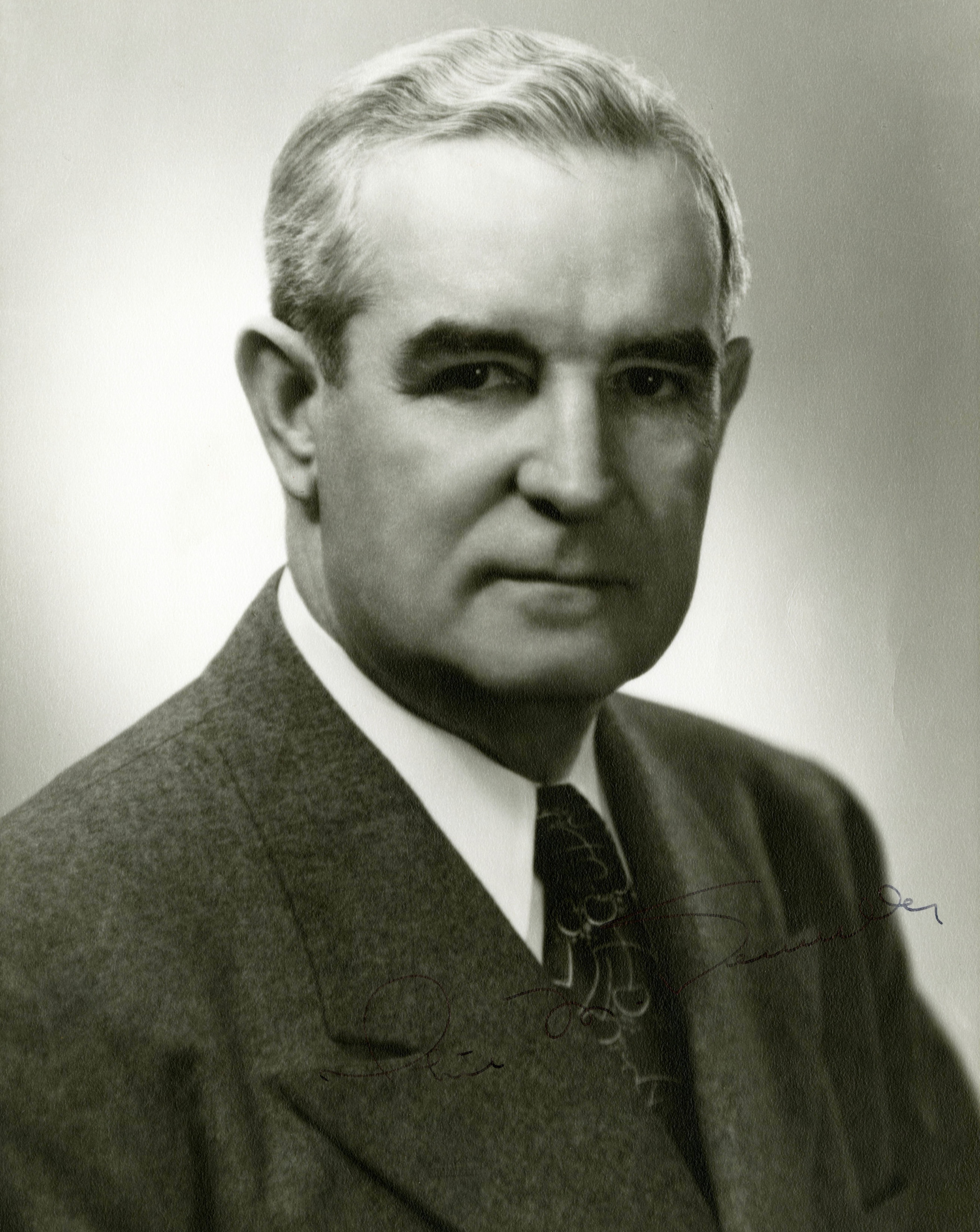

Nominee	Phil M. Donnelly	Jean Paul Bradshaw
Party	Democratic	Republican
Popular vote	793,490	762,908
Percentage	50.94%	48.97%
- County results Donnelly: 50–60% 60–70% 70–80% 80–90% Bradshaw: 50–60% 60–70% 70–80% 80–90%
Governor before election
Forrest C. Donnell
Republican
Elected Governor
Phil M. Donnelly
Democratic

The 1944 Missouri gubernatorial election was held on November 7, 1944, and resulted in a narrow victory for the Democratic nominee, State Senator Phil M. Donnelly, over the Republican nominee Jean Paul Bradshaw, and candidates representing the Socialist and Socialist Labor parties.

== Results ==
1944 gubernatorial election, Missouri
Party	Candidate	Votes	%	±%
Democratic	Phil M. Donnelly	793,490	50.94	+1.09
Republican	Jean Paul Bradshaw	762,908	48.97	−1.08
Socialist	W. F. Rinck	1,226	0.08	−0.01
Socialist Labor	Stephen Tendler	220	0.01	±0.00
Majority		30,582	1.96	+1.76
Turnout		1,557,844	41.96	−6.96
Democratic gain from Republican		Swing		
