= Phil M. Donnelly =

American politician (1891–1961)

Phil Donnelly
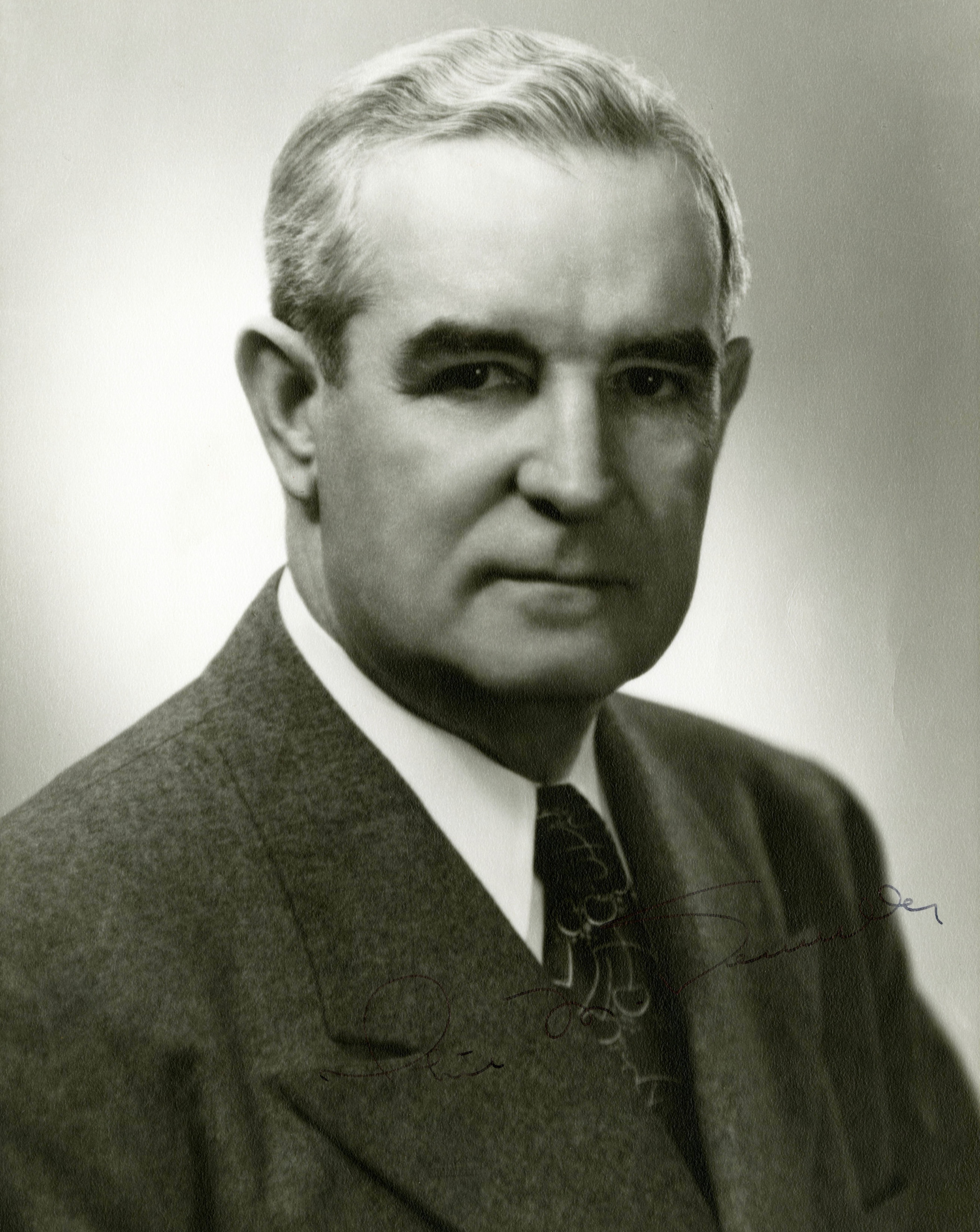

41st and 43rd Governor of Missouri
- In office January 8, 1945 – January 10, 1949
- Lieutenant: Walter Naylor Davis
- Preceded by: Forrest C. Donnell
- Succeeded by: Forrest Smith
- In office January 12, 1953 – January 14, 1957
- Lieutenant: James T. Blair, Jr.
- Preceded by: Forrest Smith
- Succeeded by: James T. Blair, Jr.

Personal details
- Born: March 6, 1891 Lebanon, Missouri, U.S.
- Died: September 12, 1961 (aged 70) Lebanon, Missouri, U.S.
- Party: Democratic
- Spouse: Juanita McFadden
- Education: St. Louis University
- Profession: Attorney; Politician

Philip Matthew Donnelly (March 6, 1891 – September 12, 1961) was an American politician who served as the 41st and 43rd governor of Missouri. He was a member of the Democratic Party. Donnelly and Kit Bond are the only Missouri governors to serve two non-consecutive terms.

== Personal history ==
Donnelly was born in Lebanon, Missouri, in 1891, the son of Phil and Margaret (Halloran) Donnelly. Following his graduation from Lebanon High School in 1909, Donnelly attended Saint Louis University, earning a law degree in 1913. Donnelly returned to Lebanon and entered private practice with J.W. Farris. In 1915, he married Miss Juanita McFadden. They had one son, David, who himself later became an attorney and joined his father's law practice.

== Political history ==
Soon after his passing of the Missouri Bar and return to Lebanon, Donnelly expressed an interest in politics. His first office was that of Lebanon's city attorney, followed by election to one term as Laclede County prosecutor. Donnelly entered state politics in 1922 by being elected state representative for the Laclede County area. After one term in the Missouri House of Representatives, he was elected to the Missouri Senate in 1924 and remained there for the next twenty years.

Donnelly ran for governor of Missouri in 1944, narrowly defeating Republican nominee Jean Paul Bradshaw by a margin of 51%–49%. During his first term as governor, Donnelly oversaw the implementation of a new Missouri state constitution in 1946 and the creation of the Missouri Department of Revenue, and he welcomed British statesman Winston Churchill to Fulton, Missouri, where Churchill delivered his famous Iron Curtain speech at Westminster College.

At the time, Missouri's constitution prohibited a governor from serving two consecutive terms, so Donnelly was ineligible to run again in 1948. However, he ran for governor again in 1952 against former Speaker of the Missouri House of Representatives Howard Elliott, defeating him by a margin of 53%–47%. Donnelly thus became the first governor of Missouri to serve two full terms.

Following his second term, Donnelly semi-retired to his law practice in Lebanon with his son. Donnelly died on September 12, 1961, and is buried in the city cemetery in Lebanon.

== Honors ==
- Honorary Doctor of Law degrees were bestowed upon Governor Donnelly by Washington University, Westminster College, and William Jewell College.
- Donnelly Elementary School in Lebanon, Missouri, is named for the governor.
- Donnelly Hall, formerly a residence hall (1961–2004) at the University of Missouri, was named in honor of the governor.

Party political offices
Preceded by Larry McDaniel	Democratic nominee for Governor of Missouri; 1944	Succeeded by Forrest Smith
Preceded by Forrest Smith	Democratic nominee for Governor of Missouri; 1952	Succeeded by James T. Blair Jr.
Political offices
Preceded by Forrest C. Donnell	Governor of Missouri; 1945–1949	Succeeded by Forrest Smith
Preceded by Forrest Smith	Governor of Missouri; 1953–1957	Succeeded by James T. Blair, Jr.
