= John Herbert Claiborne =

American politician and medical administrator (1828–1905)

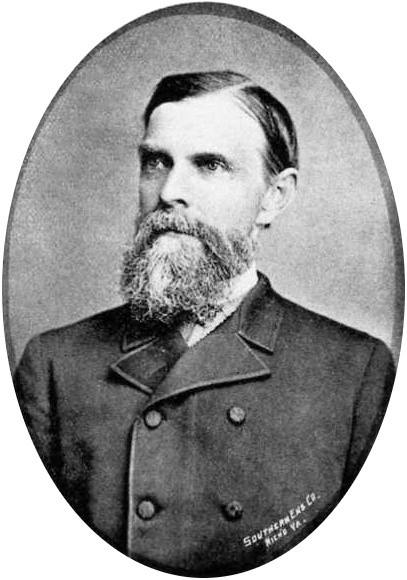
- Claiborne, c. 1870

Member of the Virginia State Senate
- In office 1858–1863

Member of the Virginia House of Delegates
- In office 1855–1856

Personal details
- Born: March 16, 1828 Brunswick County, Virginia, U.S.
- Died: February 24, 1905 (aged 81) Petersburg, Virginia, U.S.
- Spouses: Sara Joseph Alston (m. 1853; died 1869) Annie Leslie Watson (m. 1887)
- Children: 6
- Relatives: Robert Claiborne (grandson)
- Education: Randolph–Macon College (BA), (MA)

Military service
- Allegiance: Confederate States of America
- Branch/service: Confederate States Army
- Years of service: 1861–1865
- Rank: Captain
- Unit: 12th Virginia Infantry
- Battles/wars: American Civil War; Siege of Petersburg

John Herbert Claiborne (March 16, 1828 – February 24, 1905) was a Virginia politician and a leading medical administrator commanding a series of hospitals serving wounded Confederate soldiers during the American Civil War.

== Early life and education ==
John Herbert Claiborne was born to John Gregory and Mary E. (Weldon) Claiborne in 1828 in Brunswick County, Virginia.

He was educated at Randolph–Macon College, receiving a BA in 1848 and an MA in 1853.

He completed his medical studies in Philadelphia in 1851.

== Career ==
That same year, he established a practice in Petersburg.

He served later in the Virginia House of Delegates from 1855–1866 and in the Virginia State Senate from 1858–1863.

Claiborne volunteered as a surgeon in the 12th Virginia Infantry on April 19, 1861, with the rank of captain. On February 15, 1862, he was ordered to establish a hospital in Petersburg for treatment of wounded soldiers and was made surgeon in charge of local Confederate forces.

By the time of the Siege of Petersburg, he was the executive officer in charge of all military hospitals in Petersburg. The city's system included seven hospitals at first, but by the time of the siege, they had been consolidated into two buildings on the western side of Petersburg to avoid shelling from the east.

He wrote Seventy-Five Years in Old Virginia: With Some Account of the Life of the Author and Some History of the People Amongst Whom His Lot Was Cast, Their ... the War, During the War and After the War.

== Personal life ==
Claiborne's married his first wife, Sara Joseph Alston (1834–1869), on May 2, 1853 in Franklin County, North Carolina. The couple had five children together. She died shortly after the war in 1869.

He remarried to Annie Leslie Watson on November 3, 1887. They had one child.

A daughter, Lula, married H.H. Page in June 1876. Another daughter, Bessie, married Bernard Mann on February 24, 1886. He continued to practice in Petersburg.

He was the grandfather of Robert Claiborne and Clara Claiborne Park and the great-grandfather of Paul Park.

== Death ==
He died at his home there on February 24, 1905.
