= 1948 Missouri gubernatorial election =

- November 2, 1948
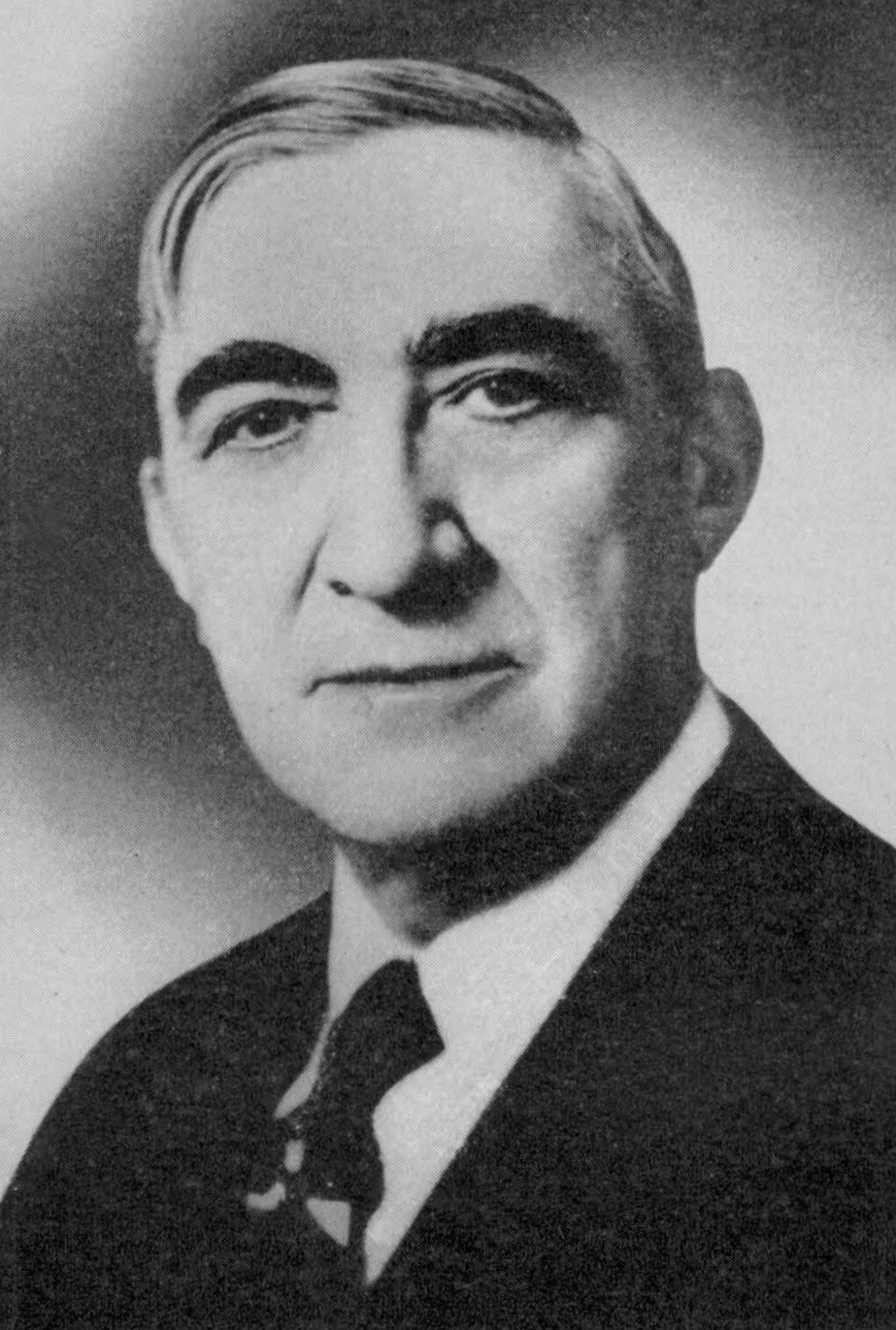

Nominee	Forrest Smith	Murray Thompson
Party	Democratic	Republican
Popular vote	893,092	670,064
Percentage	56.98%	42.75%
- County results Smith: 40–50% 50–60% 60–70% 70–80% 80–90% Thompson: 50–60% 60–70% 70–80%
Governor before election
Phil M. Donnelly
Democratic
Elected Governor
Forrest Smith
Democratic

The 1948 Missouri gubernatorial election was held on November 2, 1948, and resulted in a victory for the Democratic nominee, State Auditor Forrest Smith, over the Republican nominee Murray Thompson, and candidates representing the Progressive, Socialist and Socialist Labor parties. Smith defeated Roy McKittrick for the nomination, while Thompson defeated Manvel H. Davis.

== Results ==
1948 gubernatorial election, Missouri
Party	Candidate	Votes	%	±%
Democratic	Forrest Smith	893,092	56.98	+6.04
Republican	Murray Thompson	670,064	42.75	−6.22
Progressive	Robert B. Logsdon	2,874	0.18	+0.18
Socialist	Ralph E. Gipe	1,117	0.07	−0.01
Socialist Labor	Henry W. Genck	191	0.01	±0.00
Majority		223,028	14.23	+12.27
Turnout		1,567,338	41.41	−0.55
Democratic hold		Swing		
