= Forrest Smith =

American politician (1886–1962)

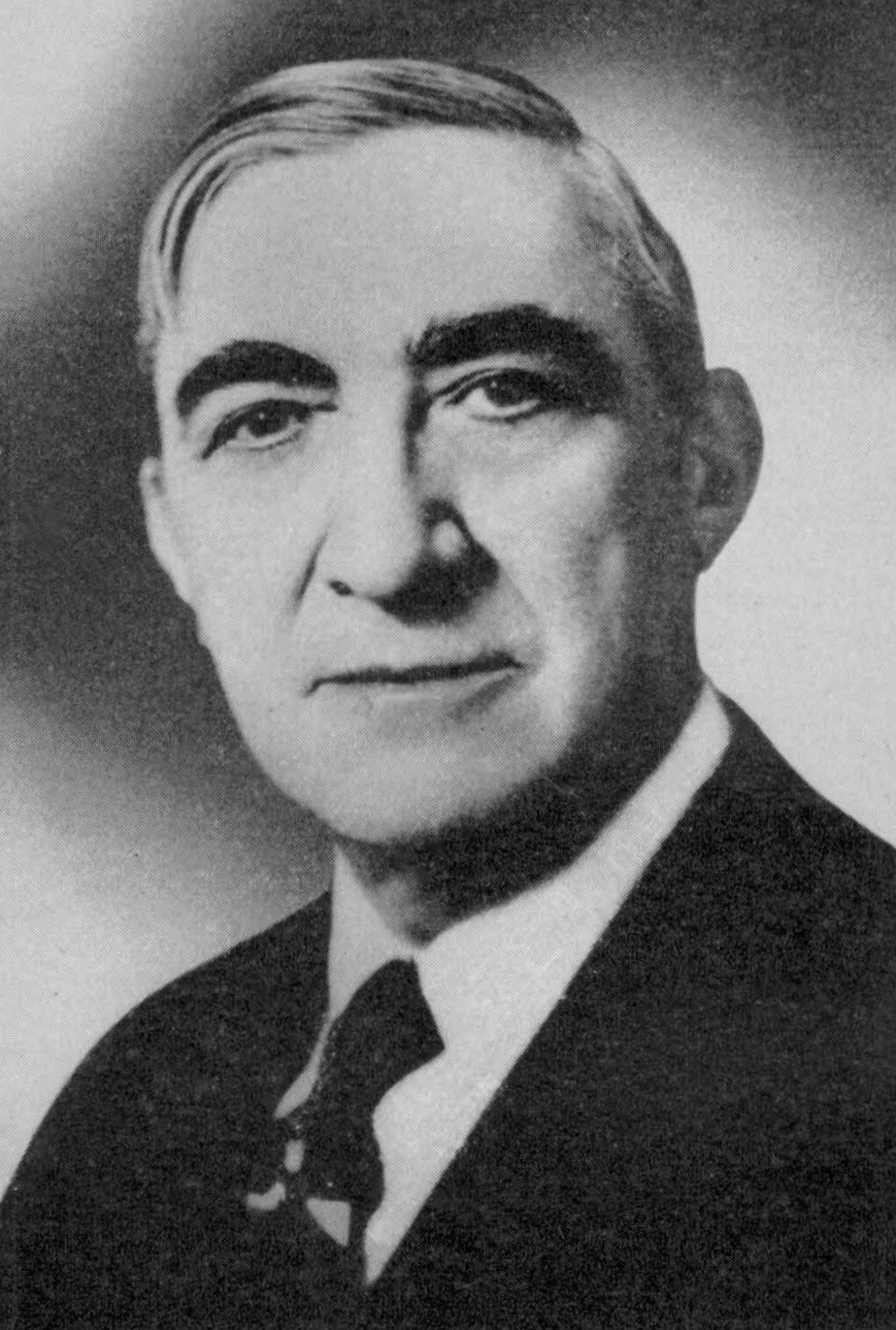

42nd Governor of Missouri
- In office January 10, 1949 – January 12, 1953
- Lieutenant: James T. Blair, Jr.
- Preceded by: Phil M. Donnelly
- Succeeded by: Phil M. Donnelly

25th State Auditor of Missouri
- In office January 9, 1933 – January 10, 1949
- Governor: Guy Brasfield Park; Lloyd C. Stark; Forrest C. Donnell; Phil M. Donnelly
- Preceded by: Lorenzo Dow Thompson
- Succeeded by: W.H. Holmes

Personal details
- Born: February 14, 1886 Ray County, Missouri, U.S.
- Died: March 8, 1962 (aged 76) Gulfport, Mississippi, U.S.
- Party: Democratic
- Spouse: Mildred (Williams) Smith
- Children: Two daughters: Forrestine & Mary Josephine
- Education: Westminster College (Missouri)
- Profession: Politician

Forrest Smith (February 14, 1886 – March 8, 1962) was an American politician who served as the 42nd governor of Missouri. He was a Democrat.

== Personal life ==
Forrest Smith was born February 14, 1886, near Hardin in Ray County, Missouri. After receiving his secondary education at Woodson Institute in Richmond, Missouri, Smith attended Westminster College. On October 12, 1915, he married Mildred Williams and they were the parents of two daughters, Forrestine and Mary Josephine. Smith was a Methodist.

== Career ==
Forrest Smith began his lifelong political career in 1910, when he became deputy assessor for Ray County, Missouri. In 1914, he was elected county clerk for Ray County, a position he held for the next eight years. From 1925 to 1932, Smith served on the Missouri state tax commission, a post that laid the groundwork for a long career in statewide elected office. In 1932, Smith was elected Missouri state auditor, a position he would hold for the next sixteen years until being elected governor in 1948. According to the August 16, 1948, issue of Time magazine, Smith "helped himself get re-elected by reminding voters that he was the man who mailed out the old-age pension checks".

=== Gubernatorial controversies ===
From the outset, Forrest Smith's term as governor was followed by whisper and innuendo, primarily that he owed his election to elements of organized crime. By 1948 reputed Kansas City mobster Charlie Binaggio had rebuilt a powerful political machine from the ashes of the one originally created by Boss Tom Pendergast, which he used in Smith's favor. According to American Mafia.com:

When Binaggio swung the vote for Forrest Smith and he won the Democratic nomination for governor in 1948, he convinced the gambling interests throughout the state that with their financial support Smith could win in the November election and they could "open up" the state. The amount of money the gamblers put up was estimated to be between $50,000 to $200,000, most of it from the St. Louis/East St. Louis area.

The Smith-Binaggio connection and its effect on Mob business nationwide even played a part in Senator Estes Kefauver's 1950 Senate Special Committee to Investigate Organized Crime in Interstate Commerce, in particular the Forrest Smith for Governor Club. This mafia influence greatly tainted the relationship between Smith and the national Democratic Party. Despite this, Smith, as sitting governor, was the lead delegate to the 1952 Democratic National Convention. Additionally, the 1950 murder of Binaggio had closed off many avenues of fundraising and guaranteed votes. By now in his mid-60s with a lifetime of public service, Governor Smith retired from public life following completion of his term in January 1953. Governor Smith died March 8, 1962, in Gulfport, Mississippi. He is buried in Sunny Slope Cemetery, Richmond, Missouri.

== Legacy ==
- The 1951 Municipal Land Clearance for Redevelopment Law. Signed by Smith, it allowed for the issuance of bonds by cities and towns statewide, which greatly expanded and improved public infrastructure such as water and sewer, as well as new industry in blighted areas.
- Forrest Lake, the centerpiece of Thousand Hills State Park near Kirksville, Missouri, is named for Smith.
- A dormitory at the University of Missouri in Columbia, Missouri also bore his name before being torn down in 2004.
- Missouri environmentalists consider an eloquent denunciation by former Governor Smith of US Army Corps of Engineers plans to construct a dam the Current River as being one of the contributing factor to the plans' defeat.

Party political offices
Preceded by George H. Middelkamp	Democratic nominee for Auditor of Missouri; 1928, 1932, 1936, 1940, 1944	Succeeded by W. H. Holmes
Preceded by Phil M. Donnelly	Democratic nominee for Governor of Missouri; 1948	Succeeded by Phil M. Donnelly
Political offices
Preceded by Phil M. Donnelly	Governor of Missouri; 1949-1953	Succeeded by Phil M. Donnelly
